= 1973–74 Oral Roberts Titans basketball team =

American college basketball season

1973–74 Oral Roberts Titans men's basketball

NCAA tournament, Elite Eight
- Conference: Independent

Ranking
- AP: No. 18
- Record: 23–6
- Head coach: Ken Trickey (5th season)
- Assistant coaches: Jack Sutter; Terry Scott
- Home arena: Mabee Center

1973–74 NCAA Division I men's basketball independents standings
	Conf.				Overall
Team	W		L	PCT	W		L	PCT
No. 5 Notre Dame		–		–	26	–	3	.897
No. 8 Providence		–		–	28	–	4	.875
No. 16 Pittsburgh		–		–	25	–	4	.862
UNC Charlotte		–		–	22	–	4	.846
Centenary		–		–	21	–	4	.840
Marquette		–		–	26	–	5	.839
No. 19 South Carolina		–		–	22	–	5	.815
No. 18 Oral Roberts		–		–	23	–	6	.793
South Alabama		–		–	22	–	6	.786
Creighton		–		–	23	–	7	.767
St. John's		–		–	20	–	7	.741
Georgia Southern		–		–	19	–	7	.731
Southern Illinois		–		–	19	–	7	.731
Syracuse		–		–	19	–	7	.731
VCU		–		–	17	–	7	.708
Cincinnati		–		–	19	–	8	.704
Boston College		–		–	21	–	9	.700
Florida State		–		–	18	–	8	.692
Rutgers		–		–	18	–	8	.692
No. 20 Dayton		–		–	20	–	9	.690
Hawaii		–		–	19	–	9	.679
Jacksonville		–		–	20	–	10	.667
Manhattan		–		–	18	–	9	.667
Mercer		–		–	16	–	8	.667
Detroit		–		–	17	–	9	.654
Fairfield		–		–	17	–	9	.654
Houston		–		–	17	–	9	.654
Illinois State		–		–	17	–	9	.654
Marshall		–		–	17	–	9	.654
St. Bonaventure		–		–	17	–	9	.654
Stetson		–		–	17	–	9	.654
DePaul		–		–	16	–	9	.640
Memphis State		–		–	19	–	11	.633
Northeast Louisiana		–		–	16	–	10	.615
Utah State		–		–	16	–	10	.615
Colgate		–		–	15	–	10	.600
Portland State		–		–	16	–	11	.593
Seton Hall		–		–	16	–	11	.593
Pan American		–		–	13	–	9	.591
George Washington		–		–	15	–	11	.577
Portland		–		–	15	–	11	.577
Saint Francis (PA)		–		–	15	–	11	.577
Ball State		–		–	14	–	12	.538
Butler		–		–	14	–	12	.538
Canisius		–		–	14	–	12	.538
Milwaukee		–		–	14	–	12	.538
Penn State		–		–	14	–	12	.538
Northeastern		–		–	12	–	11	.522
Long Island		–		–	13	–	12	.520
Duquesne		–		–	12	–	12	.500
Georgetown		–		–	13	–	13	.500
Oklahoma City		–		–	13	–	13	.500
Virginia Tech		–		–	13	–	13	.500
Indiana State		–		–	12	–	14	.462
Loyola Chicago		–		–	12	–	14	.462
Niagara		–		–	12	–	14	.462
Tulane		–		–	12	–	14	.462
Air Force		–		–	11	–	13	.458
Iona		–		–	11	–	13	.458
St. Francis (NY)		–		–	11	–	13	.458
Fairleigh Dickinson		–		–	11	–	14	.440
Hardin-Simmons		–		–	11	–	14	.440
South Florida		–		–	11	–	14	.440
Denver		–		–	11	–	15	.423
Southern Mississippi		–		–	11	–	15	.423
Navy		–		–	9	–	13	.409
West Virginia		–		–	10	–	15	.400
Fordham		–		–	8	–	17	.320
Northern Illinois		–		–	8	–	17	.320
Eastern Michigan		–		–	8	–	18	.308
Holy Cross		–		–	8	–	18	.308
Saint Peter's		–		–	8	–	18	.308
Xavier		–		–	8	–	18	.308
Villanova		–		–	7	–	19	.269
Army		–		–	6	–	18	.250
Houston Baptist		–		–	6	–	19	.240
Cleveland State		–		–	6	–	20	.231
Samford		–		–	6	–	20	.231
Buffalo		–		–	5	–	20	.200
Georgia Tech		–		–	5	–	21	.192
Georgia State		–		–	1	–	25	.038
Rankings from AP Poll

The 1973–74 Oral Roberts Titans men's basketball team represented Oral Roberts University during the 1973–74 NCAA Division I men's basketball season. The Titans, led by fifth year head coach Ken Trickey, and played their home games at the Mabee Center as an NCAA Independent. For the first time in school history, they received a bid to the NCAA tournament playing in the Midwest region. The Titans defeated Syracuse in OT in the opening round and Louisville in the regional semifinals. In heartbreaking fashion, ORU was beaten by Kansas in OT in the Midwest regional final. They finished the season 23–6 and ranked number 18 in the final AP poll.

Senior Eddie Woods established the school record for career rebounds with 1,365.

== Roster ==
1973–74 Oral Roberts Golden Eagles men's basketball team
Players
Coaches

Pos.	#	Name	Height	Weight	Year	Hometown
G	10	Stan Kerby	5 ft 10 in (1.78 m)	—	Jr	Mound City, Illinois
G	11	David Tucker	5 ft 11 in (1.8 m)	—	Fr	Olney, Illinois
G	12	Bill Fredrick	6 ft 2 in (1.88 m)	—	Jr	Detroit, Michigan
G	13	Sam McCants	6 ft 3 in (1.91 m)	—	Jr	Pensacola, Florida
G	14	Kenny Cooper	6 ft 3 in (1.91 m)	—	So	Nashville, Tennessee
F	15	Anthony Roberts	6 ft 5 in (1.96 m)	—	Fr	Chattanooga, Tennessee
F	20	Carl Vinson	6 ft 3 in (1.91 m)	—	Jr	Cairo, Illinois
G	21	Jasper Brown	6 ft 0 in (1.83 m)	—	Jr	Okmulgee, Oklahoma
C	22	Kenny Robinson	6 ft 11 in (2.11 m)	—	Jr	Calexico, California
F	25	Duane Fox	6 ft 6 in (1.98 m)	—	Jr	Detroit, Michigan
F	30	Eddie Woods	6 ft 7 in (2.01 m)	—	Sr	Chattanooga, Tennessee
G	35	Al Boswell	6 ft 5 in (1.96 m)	—	Jr	River Rogue, Michigan
F	44	Alvin Scott	6 ft 7 in (2.01 m)	180 lb (82 kg)	Fr	Cleveland, Tennessee
C	53	Bill Herring	6 ft 9 in (2.06 m)	—	Sr	Jenks, Oklahoma
C	55	Richard Lucas	7 ft 0 in (2.13 m)	—	Jr	Fincastle, Virginia

Head coach

- Ken Trickey (Middle Tennessee)

Assistant coach(es)

Legend

- (C) Team captain
- (S) Suspended
- (I) Ineligible
- (W) Walk-on
- Injured
- Current redshirt

Roster

== Schedule and results ==
Date time, TV	Rank^{#}	Opponent^{#}	Result	Record	Site (attendance) city, state
Regular season
Dec 10, 1973*		Southwestern (TX)	W 105–76	1–0	Mabee Center; Tulsa, Oklahoma
Dec 10, 1973*		Hardin-Simmons	W 120–91	2–0	Mabee Center; Tulsa, Oklahoma
Dec 13, 1973*		San Diego State	W 95–78	3–0	Mabee Center; Tulsa, Oklahoma
Dec 15, 1973*		at No. 19 Jacksonville	L 86–91	3–1	Jacksonville Memorial Coliseum; Jacksonville, Florida
Dec 17, 1973*		Eastern Kentucky	W 80–70	4–1	Mabee Center; Tulsa, Oklahoma
Dec 19, 1973*		Cal State Hayward	W 88–62	5–1	Mabee Center; Tulsa, Oklahoma
Dec 21, 1973*		Los Angeles State	W 103–76	6–1	Mabee Center; Tulsa, Oklahoma
Dec 22, 1973*		Murray State	W 86–83	7–1	Mabee Center; Tulsa, Oklahoma
Dec 26, 1973*		vs. Weber State	W 82–79	8–1	
Dec 28, 1973*		vs. Houston	W 118–108	9–1	
Dec 29, 1973*		No. 14 USC	L 75–96	9–2	Mabee Center; Tulsa, Oklahoma
Jan 4, 1974*		at Pepperdine	W 87–74	10–2	Firestone Fieldhouse; Malibu, California
Jan 9, 1974*		Illinois State	W 94–91	11–2	Mabee Center; Tulsa, Oklahoma
Jan 15, 1974*		Nebraska–Omaha	W 111–79	12–2	Mabee Center; Tulsa, Oklahoma
Jan 17, 1974*		at Loyola–Chicago	W 105–90	13–2	Alumni Gym; Chicago, Illinois
Jan 19, 1974*		at Virginia Tech	W 70–68	14–2	Cassell Coliseum; Blacksburg, Virginia
Jan 21, 1974*		Lamar	W 109–75	15–2	Mabee Center; Tulsa, Oklahoma
Jan 26, 1974*		Texas-Pan American	W 107–90	16–2	Mabee Center; Tulsa, Oklahoma
Feb 2, 1974*		at No. 10 Long Beach State	L 89–98	16–3	Long Beach Arena; Long Beach, California
Feb 4, 1974*		Bowling Green	W 78–72	17–3	Mabee Center; Tulsa, Oklahoma
Feb 9, 1974*		Pepperdine	W 98–71	18–3	Mabee Center; Tulsa, Oklahoma
Feb 14, 1974*		at Oklahoma City	L 94–100	18–4	Fredrickson Fieldhouse; Oklahoma City, Oklahoma
Feb 16, 1974*		McNeese State	W 103–96	19–4	Mabee Center; Tulsa, Oklahoma
Feb 25, 1974*		Southern Illinois	W 102–88	20–4	Mabee Center; Tulsa, Oklahoma
Mar 2, 1974*		Oklahoma City	W 103–84	21–4	Mabee Center; Tulsa, Oklahoma
Mar 4, 1974*		at Tulsa	L 84–85	21–5	Expo Square Pavilion; Tulsa, Oklahoma
NCAA tournament
Mar 9, 1974*		vs. Syracuse	W 86–82 ^{OT}	22–5	UNT Coliseum; Denton, Texas
Mar 14, 1974*		vs. No. 16 Louisville; Midwest Regional Final – Sweet Sixteen	W 96–93	23–5	Mabee Center; Tulsa, Oklahoma
Mar 16, 1974*		vs. No. 14 Kansas; Midwest Regional Final – Elite Eight	L 90–93 ^{OT}	23–6	Mabee Center; Tulsa, Oklahoma
*Non-conference game. ^{#}Rankings from AP poll. (#) Tournament seedings in parentheses. MW=Midwest. All times are in Central Time.
