= 1973–74 Syracuse Orangemen basketball team =

American college basketball season

1973–74 Syracuse Orangemen basketball

NCAA tournament, First round
- Conference: Independent
- Record: 19–7
- Head coach: Roy Danforth (6th season)
- Assistant coaches: Jim Boeheim (5th season); Tom Green (2nd season)
- Home arena: Manley Field House

1973–74 NCAA Division I men's basketball independents standings
| | Conf. | | | | Overall |
| Team | W | | L | PCT | W | | L | PCT |
|---|---|---|---|---|---|---|---|---|
| No. 5 Notre Dame | | – | | – | 26 | – | 3 | .897 |
| No. 8 Providence | | – | | – | 28 | – | 4 | .875 |
| No. 16 Pittsburgh | | – | | – | 25 | – | 4 | .862 |
| UNC Charlotte | | – | | – | 22 | – | 4 | .846 |
| Centenary | | – | | – | 21 | – | 4 | .840 |
| Marquette | | – | | – | 26 | – | 5 | .839 |
| No. 19 South Carolina | | – | | – | 22 | – | 5 | .815 |
| No. 18 Oral Roberts | | – | | – | 23 | – | 6 | .793 |
| South Alabama | | – | | – | 22 | – | 6 | .786 |
| Creighton | | – | | – | 23 | – | 7 | .767 |
| St. John's | | – | | – | 20 | – | 7 | .741 |
| Georgia Southern | | – | | – | 19 | – | 7 | .731 |
| Southern Illinois | | – | | – | 19 | – | 7 | .731 |
| Syracuse | | – | | – | 19 | – | 7 | .731 |
| VCU | | – | | – | 17 | – | 7 | .708 |
| Cincinnati | | – | | – | 19 | – | 8 | .704 |
| Boston College | | – | | – | 21 | – | 9 | .700 |
| Florida State | | – | | – | 18 | – | 8 | .692 |
| Rutgers | | – | | – | 18 | – | 8 | .692 |
| No. 20 Dayton | | – | | – | 20 | – | 9 | .690 |
| Hawaii | | – | | – | 19 | – | 9 | .679 |
| Jacksonville | | – | | – | 20 | – | 10 | .667 |
| Manhattan | | – | | – | 18 | – | 9 | .667 |
| Mercer | | – | | – | 16 | – | 8 | .667 |
| Detroit | | – | | – | 17 | – | 9 | .654 |
| Fairfield | | – | | – | 17 | – | 9 | .654 |
| Houston | | – | | – | 17 | – | 9 | .654 |
| Illinois State | | – | | – | 17 | – | 9 | .654 |
| Marshall | | – | | – | 17 | – | 9 | .654 |
| St. Bonaventure | | – | | – | 17 | – | 9 | .654 |
| Stetson | | – | | – | 17 | – | 9 | .654 |
| DePaul | | – | | – | 16 | – | 9 | .640 |
| Memphis State | | – | | – | 19 | – | 11 | .633 |
| Northeast Louisiana | | – | | – | 16 | – | 10 | .615 |
| Utah State | | – | | – | 16 | – | 10 | .615 |
| Colgate | | – | | – | 15 | – | 10 | .600 |
| Portland State | | – | | – | 16 | – | 11 | .593 |
| Seton Hall | | – | | – | 16 | – | 11 | .593 |
| Pan American | | – | | – | 13 | – | 9 | .591 |
| George Washington | | – | | – | 15 | – | 11 | .577 |
| Portland | | – | | – | 15 | – | 11 | .577 |
| Saint Francis (PA) | | – | | – | 15 | – | 11 | .577 |
| Ball State | | – | | – | 14 | – | 12 | .538 |
| Butler | | – | | – | 14 | – | 12 | .538 |
| Canisius | | – | | – | 14 | – | 12 | .538 |
| Milwaukee | | – | | – | 14 | – | 12 | .538 |
| Penn State | | – | | – | 14 | – | 12 | .538 |
| Northeastern | | – | | – | 12 | – | 11 | .522 |
| Long Island | | – | | – | 13 | – | 12 | .520 |
| Duquesne | | – | | – | 12 | – | 12 | .500 |
| Georgetown | | – | | – | 13 | – | 13 | .500 |
| Oklahoma City | | – | | – | 13 | – | 13 | .500 |
| Virginia Tech | | – | | – | 13 | – | 13 | .500 |
| Indiana State | | – | | – | 12 | – | 14 | .462 |
| Loyola Chicago | | – | | – | 12 | – | 14 | .462 |
| Niagara | | – | | – | 12 | – | 14 | .462 |
| Tulane | | – | | – | 12 | – | 14 | .462 |
| Air Force | | – | | – | 11 | – | 13 | .458 |
| Iona | | – | | – | 11 | – | 13 | .458 |
| St. Francis (NY) | | – | | – | 11 | – | 13 | .458 |
| Fairleigh Dickinson | | – | | – | 11 | – | 14 | .440 |
| Hardin-Simmons | | – | | – | 11 | – | 14 | .440 |
| South Florida | | – | | – | 11 | – | 14 | .440 |
| Denver | | – | | – | 11 | – | 15 | .423 |
| Southern Mississippi | | – | | – | 11 | – | 15 | .423 |
| Navy | | – | | – | 9 | – | 13 | .409 |
| West Virginia | | – | | – | 10 | – | 15 | .400 |
| Fordham | | – | | – | 8 | – | 17 | .320 |
| Northern Illinois | | – | | – | 8 | – | 17 | .320 |
| Eastern Michigan | | – | | – | 8 | – | 18 | .308 |
| Holy Cross | | – | | – | 8 | – | 18 | .308 |
| Saint Peter's | | – | | – | 8 | – | 18 | .308 |
| Xavier | | – | | – | 8 | – | 18 | .308 |
| Villanova | | – | | – | 7 | – | 19 | .269 |
| Army | | – | | – | 6 | – | 18 | .250 |
| Houston Baptist | | – | | – | 6 | – | 19 | .240 |
| Cleveland State | | – | | – | 6 | – | 20 | .231 |
| Samford | | – | | – | 6 | – | 20 | .231 |
| Buffalo | | – | | – | 5 | – | 20 | .200 |
| Georgia Tech | | – | | – | 5 | – | 21 | .192 |
| Georgia State | | – | | – | 1 | – | 25 | .038 |
Rankings from AP Poll

The 1973–74 Syracuse Orangemen basketball team represented Syracuse University in the 1973–74 NCAA Division I men's basketball season. The Orangemen were led by head coach Roy Danforth, serving in his 7th year. The team played home games at Manley Field House in Syracuse, New York. Syracuse reached the first round of the NCAA tournament and finished with a 19–7 record.

== Previous season ==
The Orangemen finished the 1972–73 season 24–5 overall. They were invited to the NCAA tournament, where they lost to Providence but beat Penn to finish third in the East Regional.

== Roster ==
1973–74 Syracuse Orange men's basketball team
Players
Coaches

| Pos. | # | Name | Height | Weight | Year | Hometown |
|---|---|---|---|---|---|---|
| G | | Dennis DuVal | 6 ft 3 in (1.91 m) | 175 lb (79 kg) | Sr | Westbury, New York |
| F | | Rudy Hackett | 6 ft 9 in (2.06 m) | 210 lb (95 kg) | Jr | Mount Vernon, New York |
| G | | Jim Lee | 6 ft 2 in (1.88 m) | 160 lb (73 kg) | Jr | Kirkwood, New York |
| F | | Fred Saunders | 6 ft 7 in (2.01 m) | 210 lb (95 kg) | Jr | Columbus, Ohio |
| C | | Bob Dooms | 6 ft 5 in (1.96 m) | — | Sr |
| F | | Chris Sease | 6 ft 5 in (1.96 m) | — | So |
| F | | Kevin King | 6 ft 4 in (1.93 m) | — | So |
| C | | Tom Stundis | 6 ft 6 in (1.98 m) | — | Sr |
| G | | Scott Stapleton | 6 ft 0 in (1.83 m) | — | Sr |
| | | Mark Meadors | 6 ft 5 in (1.96 m) | — |
| F | | Steve Shaw | 6 ft 4 in (1.93 m) | — | Jr |
| G | | Jim Williams | 5 ft 10 in (1.78 m) | — | Fr |
| G | | Don Degner | 6 ft 4 in (1.93 m) | — | Jr |
| G | | Bill Suprunowicz | 6 ft 3 in (1.91 m) | — | Sr |
| F | | Bill Demarle | 6 ft 5 in (1.96 m) | — |
| G | | Larry Kelley | 6 ft 0 in (1.83 m) | — | Fr |
| F | | Bob Parker | 6 ft 9 in (2.06 m) | — | Fr |

Head coach

- Roy Danforth (Southern Miss)

Assistant coach(es)

Legend

- (C) Team captain
- (S) Suspended
- (I) Ineligible
- (W) Walk-on
- Injured
- Current redshirt

Roster
Last update: 2025-January-7

== Schedule and results ==
| Date time, TV | Rank^{#} | Opponent^{#} | Result | Record | Site city, state |
Regular season
| December 1, 1973* | | Buffalo | W 123–78 | 1–0 | Manley Field House; Syracuse, New York |
| December 5, 1973* | | at Cornell | W 82–61 | 2–0 | Barton Hall; Ithaca, New York |
| December 8, 1973* | | at Army | W 83–66 | 3–0 | Gillis Field House; West Point, New York |
| December 12, 1973* | No. 18 | at La Salle | W 75–68 | 4–0 | Palestra; Philadelphia, Pennsylvania |
| December 19, 1973* | No. 18 | Penn State | W 59–55 | 5–0 | Manley Field House; Syracuse, New York |
| December 22, 1973* | No. 18 | Boston College | W 110–88 | 6–0 | Manley Field House; Syracuse, New York |
| December 29, 1973* | No. 15 | vs. Miami (OH); Charlotte Invitational | L 74–96 | 6–1 | Charlotte Coliseum; Charlotte, North Carolina |
| December 30, 1973* | No. 15 | vs. Loyola (IL); Charlotte Invitational | W 78–59 | 7–1 | Charlotte Coliseum; Charlotte, North Carolina |
| January 5, 1974* | No. 19 | at Rutgers | L 79–93 | 7–2 | College Avenue Gymnasium; New Brunswick, New Jersey |
| January 10, 1974* | | Connecticut | L 60–61 | 7–3 | Manley Field House; Syracuse, New York |
| January 12, 1974* | | at St. John's | W 72–71 | 8–3 | Madison Square Garden; New York City, New York |
| January 16, 1974* | | Canisius | W 87–74 | 9–3 | Manley Field House; Syracuse, New York |
| January 19, 1974* | | at Temple | W 70–61 | 10–3 | McGonigle Hall; Philadelphia, Pennsylvania |
| January 23, 1974* | | Bucknell | W 110–53 | 11–3 | Manley Field House; Syracuse, New York |
| January 26, 1974* | | UMass | W 76–60 | 12–3 | Manley Field House; Syracuse, New York |
| January 30, 1974* | | at Penn State | L 55–61 | 12–4 | Rec Hall; Penn State University Park |
| February 2, 1974* | | at American | W 82–63 | 13–4 | Fort Myer Ceremony Hall; Arlington, Virginia |
| February 6, 1974* | | Fordham | W 102–81 | 14–4 | Manley Field House; Syracuse, New York |
| February 9, 1974* | | at No. 10 Pittsburgh | L 56–71 | 14–5 | Fitzgerald Field House; Pittsburgh, Pennsylvania |
| February 11, 1974* | | at West Virginia | L 77–78 | 14–6 | WVU Coliseum; Morgantown, West Virginia |
| February 13, 1974* | | Manhattan | W 76–70 | 15–6 | Manley Field House; Syracuse, New York |
| February 16, 1974* | | at Holy Cross | W 106–87 | 16–6 | Worcester Coliseum; Worcester, Massachusetts |
| February 20, 1974* | | at Niagara | W 80–60 | 17–6 | Gallagher Center; Lewiston, New York |
| February 23, 1974* | | George Washington | W 80–79 | 18–6 | Manley Field House; Syracuse, New York |
| March 2, 1974* | | at Colgate | W 64–57 | 19–6 | Cotterell Court; Hamilton, New York |
NCAA Tournament
| March 9, 1974* | | vs. No. 20 Oral Roberts; Midwest Regional Quarterfinal | L 82–86 ^{OT} | 19–7 | UNT Coliseum; Denton, Texas |
*Non-conference game. ^{#}Rankings from AP Poll. (#) Tournament seedings in parentheses.
