= 1973–74 Illinois State Redbirds men's basketball team =

American college basketball season

1973–74 Illinois State Redbirds men's basketball
- Conference: Independent
- Record: 17–9
- Head coach: Will Robinson (4th season)
- Assistant coaches: Warren Crews; Bill Flanagan; Gene Smithson
- Home arena: Horton Field House

1973–74 NCAA Division I men's basketball independents standings
	Conf.				Overall
Team	W		L	PCT	W		L	PCT
No. 5 Notre Dame		–		–	26	–	3	.897
No. 8 Providence		–		–	28	–	4	.875
No. 16 Pittsburgh		–		–	25	–	4	.862
UNC Charlotte		–		–	22	–	4	.846
Centenary		–		–	21	–	4	.840
Marquette		–		–	26	–	5	.839
No. 19 South Carolina		–		–	22	–	5	.815
No. 18 Oral Roberts		–		–	23	–	6	.793
South Alabama		–		–	22	–	6	.786
Creighton		–		–	23	–	7	.767
St. John's		–		–	20	–	7	.741
Georgia Southern		–		–	19	–	7	.731
Southern Illinois		–		–	19	–	7	.731
Syracuse		–		–	19	–	7	.731
VCU		–		–	17	–	7	.708
Cincinnati		–		–	19	–	8	.704
Boston College		–		–	21	–	9	.700
Florida State		–		–	18	–	8	.692
Rutgers		–		–	18	–	8	.692
No. 20 Dayton		–		–	20	–	9	.690
Hawaii		–		–	19	–	9	.679
Jacksonville		–		–	20	–	10	.667
Manhattan		–		–	18	–	9	.667
Mercer		–		–	16	–	8	.667
Detroit		–		–	17	–	9	.654
Fairfield		–		–	17	–	9	.654
Houston		–		–	17	–	9	.654
Illinois State		–		–	17	–	9	.654
Marshall		–		–	17	–	9	.654
St. Bonaventure		–		–	17	–	9	.654
Stetson		–		–	17	–	9	.654
DePaul		–		–	16	–	9	.640
Memphis State		–		–	19	–	11	.633
Northeast Louisiana		–		–	16	–	10	.615
Utah State		–		–	16	–	10	.615
Colgate		–		–	15	–	10	.600
Portland State		–		–	16	–	11	.593
Seton Hall		–		–	16	–	11	.593
Pan American		–		–	13	–	9	.591
George Washington		–		–	15	–	11	.577
Portland		–		–	15	–	11	.577
Saint Francis (PA)		–		–	15	–	11	.577
Ball State		–		–	14	–	12	.538
Butler		–		–	14	–	12	.538
Canisius		–		–	14	–	12	.538
Milwaukee		–		–	14	–	12	.538
Penn State		–		–	14	–	12	.538
Northeastern		–		–	12	–	11	.522
Long Island		–		–	13	–	12	.520
Duquesne		–		–	12	–	12	.500
Georgetown		–		–	13	–	13	.500
Oklahoma City		–		–	13	–	13	.500
Virginia Tech		–		–	13	–	13	.500
Indiana State		–		–	12	–	14	.462
Loyola Chicago		–		–	12	–	14	.462
Niagara		–		–	12	–	14	.462
Tulane		–		–	12	–	14	.462
Air Force		–		–	11	–	13	.458
Iona		–		–	11	–	13	.458
St. Francis (NY)		–		–	11	–	13	.458
Fairleigh Dickinson		–		–	11	–	14	.440
Hardin-Simmons		–		–	11	–	14	.440
South Florida		–		–	11	–	14	.440
Denver		–		–	11	–	15	.423
Southern Mississippi		–		–	11	–	15	.423
Navy		–		–	9	–	13	.409
West Virginia		–		–	10	–	15	.400
Fordham		–		–	8	–	17	.320
Northern Illinois		–		–	8	–	17	.320
Eastern Michigan		–		–	8	–	18	.308
Holy Cross		–		–	8	–	18	.308
Saint Peter's		–		–	8	–	18	.308
Xavier		–		–	8	–	18	.308
Villanova		–		–	7	–	19	.269
Army		–		–	6	–	18	.250
Houston Baptist		–		–	6	–	19	.240
Cleveland State		–		–	6	–	20	.231
Samford		–		–	6	–	20	.231
Buffalo		–		–	5	–	20	.200
Georgia Tech		–		–	5	–	21	.192
Georgia State		–		–	1	–	25	.038
Rankings from AP Poll

The 1973–74 Illinois State Redbirds men's basketball team represented Illinois State University during the 1973–74 NCAA Division I men's basketball season. The Redbirds, led by fourth-year head coach Will Robinson, played their home games at Horton Field House in Normal, Illinois and competed as an independent (not a member of a conference). They finished the season 17–9.

== Roster ==
1973–74 Illinois State Redbirds men's basketball team
Players
Coaches

Pos.	#	Name	Height	Weight	Year	Hometown
C	44	Stepney Bacon	6 ft 10 in (2.08 m)	220 lb (100 kg)	Sr	Detroit, MI
C	24	Ron deVries	7 ft 0 in (2.13 m)	225 lb (102 kg)	Sr	Detroit, MI
C	25	Clarence Weaver	6 ft 9 in (2.06 m)	207 lb (94 kg)	Sr	St. Louis, MO
F	33	Calvin Harper	6 ft 7 in (2.01 m)	230 lb (104 kg)	Jr	Detroit, MI
C	11	Darrell Jeter	6 ft 7 in (2.01 m)	200 lb (91 kg)	Jr	Detroit, MI
F	41	Jeff Jones	6 ft 7 in (2.01 m)	205 lb (93 kg)	Jr	Joliet, IL
G	10	Rick Meeks	5 ft 10 in (1.78 m)	150 lb (68 kg)	Jr	Centralia, IL
G		Eric Scott	6 ft 2 in (1.88 m)	192 lb (87 kg)	Jr	Folsom, PA
G	22	Rick Whitlow	6 ft 2 in (1.88 m)	180 lb (82 kg)	Jr	Michigan City, IN
G	23	Mike Bonczyk	5 ft 10 in (1.78 m)	170 lb (77 kg)	So	South Holland, IL
G	21	Robert Hawkins	6 ft 4 in (1.93 m)	190 lb (86 kg)	So	Detroit, MI
F	40	Randy Henry	6 ft 7 in (2.01 m)	185 lb (84 kg)	So	Detroit, MI
F	35	Richard Jones	6 ft 3 in (1.91 m)	190 lb (86 kg)	So	York, AL
F	43	Roger Powell	6 ft 4 in (1.93 m)	193 lb (88 kg)	So	Joliet, IL
F	13	John Crossen	6 ft 6 in (1.98 m)	200 lb (91 kg)	Fr	St. Clair Shores, MI
F	32	Steve Scovil	6 ft 8 in (2.03 m)	200 lb (91 kg)	Fr	Rock Island, IL
F	31	Jeff Widdel	6 ft 6 in (1.98 m)	205 lb (93 kg)	Fr	Rock Island, IL

Head coach

- Will Robinson (West Virginia State)

Assistant coach(es)

- Warren Crews (Southeast Missouri State)
- Bill Flanagan (Monmouth (IL))
- Gene Smithson (North Central (IL))

Legend

- (C) Team captain
- (S) Suspended
- (I) Ineligible
- (W) Walk-on
- Injured
- Current redshirt

Roster
Last update: January 23, 2021

== Schedule ==
Date time, TV	Rank^{#}	Opponent^{#}	Result	Record	High points	High rebounds	High assists	Site (attendance) city, state
Exhibition Season
November 28, 1973*; 7:30 pm		Denmark National Team	W 110–55		22 – Harper, Whitlow	9 – Harper	15 – Hawkins	Horton Field House; Normal, IL
Regular Season
December 1, 1973*; 7:00 pm		at Eastern M⁬ichigan	W 103–85	1–0	28 – Hawkins	16 – deVries	–	Bowen Field House; Ypsilanti, MI
December 5, 1973*; 7:30 pm		William Jewell	W 94–44	2–0	18 – Harper	16 – deVries	–	Horton Field House; Normal, IL
December 8, 1973*; 7:30 pm		Washington State	W 72–63	3–0	24 – Powell	10 – deVries	–	Horton Field House; Normal, IL
December 11, 1973*; 7:30 pm		California State–Bakersfield	W 82–69	4–0	21 – Whitlow	13 – deVries	–	Horton Field House; Normal, IL
December 15, 1973*; 7:30 pm		Central Michigan	W 83–72	5–0	22 – deVries	14 – Harper	–	Horton Field House; Normal, IL
December 22, 1973*; 3:00 pm		at Purdue	L 85–114	5–1	22 – Powell	6 – Harper, Powell	–	Mackey Arena; West Lafayette, IN
December 27, 1973*; 8:30 pm		at Idaho State	L 80–107	5–2	22 – Whitlow	10 – deVries, Harper	–	ASISU Minidome; Pocatello, ID
December 29, 1973*		at San Diego State	L 88–97	5–3	26 – deVries	11 – deVries	–	Peterson Gymnasium; San Diego, CA
January 2, 1974*		at Drake	L 90–99	5–4	25 – deVries	16 – deVries	–	Veterans Memorial Auditorium; Des Moines, IA
January 5, 1974*; 7:30 pm		Southern Illinois	L 80–82 ^{OT}	5–5	35 – Whitlow	20 – deVries	–	Horton Field House; Normal, IL
January 9, 1974*		at Oral Roberts	L 91–94	5–6	29 – Whitlow	14 – deVries	–	Mabee Center; Tulsa, OK
January 12, 1974*; 7:30 pm		at Northern Illinois	W 95–85	6–6	23 – Whitlow	23 – deVries	–	Chick Evans Field House (1,817); DeKalb, IL
January 17, 1974*; 7:30 pm		Fairleigh Dickinson	W 68–65	7–6	16 – deVries	14 – deVries	–	Horton Field House; Normal, IL
January 19, 1974*; 7:30 pm		Pacific	W 71–60	8–6	19 – deVries	24 – deVries	–	Horton Field House; Normal, IL
January 26, 1974*; 7:30 pm		at Louisiana State–New Orleans	L 67–74	8–7	20 – Whitlow	17 – deVries	–	Health & Physical Education Center (3,550); New Orleans, LA
January 28, 1974*; 7:30 pm		Eastern Michigan	W 96–80	9–7	22 – Hawkins	12 – deVries	–	Horton Field House; Normal, IL
January 30, 1974*; 7:30 pm		Marshall	W 103–80	10–7	26 – Whitlow	17 – deVries	–	Horton Field House; Normal, IL
February 2, 1974*; 7:35 pm		at Southern Illinois	L 69–87	10–8	32 – deVries	8 – Harper	–	SIU Arena; Carbondale, IL
February 5, 1974*; 7:30 pm		Morehead State	W 113–74	11–8	29 – Whitlow	15 – Harper	–	Horton Field House; Normal, IL
February 9, 1974*; 7:30 pm		Chicago State	W 121–84	12–8	26 – Whitlow	14 – deVries	–	Horton Field House; Normal, IL
February 11, 1974*; 7:30 pm		Ball State	W 83–77	13–8	19 – deVries, Whitlow, Hawkins	20 – deVries	–	Horton Field House; Normal, IL
February 16, 1974*; 7:30 pm		Wisconsin–Milwaukee	W 58–55	14–8	23 – Whitlow	8 – Harper	–	Horton Field House; Normal, IL
February 20, 1974*; 7:30 pm		Northern Illinois	W 130–93	15–8	58 – Hawkins	15 – Harper	–	Horton Field House (5,200); Normal, IL
February 27, 1974*; 7:30 pm		at Western Illinois	W 95–82	16–8	35 – Whitlow	14 – deVries	–	Western Hall; Macomb, IL
March 2, 1974*; 7:00 pm		at Indiana State	W 76–73	17–8	23 – Whitlow	16 – deVries	–	Hulman Civic University Center; Terre Haute, IN
March 4, 1974*; 7:00 pm		at No. 18 Louisville	L 107–117	17–9	38 – Whitlow	19 – deVries	–	Freedom Hall; Louisville, KY
*Non-conference game. ^{#}Rankings from AP Poll. (#) Tournament seedings in parentheses. All times are in Central Standard Time.
