= 1973–74 Centenary Gentlemen basketball team =

American college basketball season

1973–74 Centenary Gentlemen men's basketball
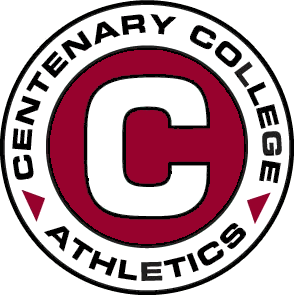
- Conference: Independent
- Record: 21–4
- Head coach: Larry Little (3rd season)
- Home arena: Gold Dome

1973–74 NCAA Division I men's basketball independents standings
	Conf.				Overall
Team	W		L	PCT	W		L	PCT
No. 5 Notre Dame		–		–	26	–	3	.897
No. 8 Providence		–		–	28	–	4	.875
No. 16 Pittsburgh		–		–	25	–	4	.862
UNC Charlotte		–		–	22	–	4	.846
Centenary		–		–	21	–	4	.840
Marquette		–		–	26	–	5	.839
No. 19 South Carolina		–		–	22	–	5	.815
No. 18 Oral Roberts		–		–	23	–	6	.793
South Alabama		–		–	22	–	6	.786
Creighton		–		–	23	–	7	.767
St. John's		–		–	20	–	7	.741
Georgia Southern		–		–	19	–	7	.731
Southern Illinois		–		–	19	–	7	.731
Syracuse		–		–	19	–	7	.731
VCU		–		–	17	–	7	.708
Cincinnati		–		–	19	–	8	.704
Boston College		–		–	21	–	9	.700
Florida State		–		–	18	–	8	.692
Rutgers		–		–	18	–	8	.692
No. 20 Dayton		–		–	20	–	9	.690
Hawaii		–		–	19	–	9	.679
Jacksonville		–		–	20	–	10	.667
Manhattan		–		–	18	–	9	.667
Mercer		–		–	16	–	8	.667
Detroit		–		–	17	–	9	.654
Fairfield		–		–	17	–	9	.654
Houston		–		–	17	–	9	.654
Illinois State		–		–	17	–	9	.654
Marshall		–		–	17	–	9	.654
St. Bonaventure		–		–	17	–	9	.654
Stetson		–		–	17	–	9	.654
DePaul		–		–	16	–	9	.640
Memphis State		–		–	19	–	11	.633
Northeast Louisiana		–		–	16	–	10	.615
Utah State		–		–	16	–	10	.615
Colgate		–		–	15	–	10	.600
Portland State		–		–	16	–	11	.593
Seton Hall		–		–	16	–	11	.593
Pan American		–		–	13	–	9	.591
George Washington		–		–	15	–	11	.577
Portland		–		–	15	–	11	.577
Saint Francis (PA)		–		–	15	–	11	.577
Ball State		–		–	14	–	12	.538
Butler		–		–	14	–	12	.538
Canisius		–		–	14	–	12	.538
Milwaukee		–		–	14	–	12	.538
Penn State		–		–	14	–	12	.538
Northeastern		–		–	12	–	11	.522
Long Island		–		–	13	–	12	.520
Duquesne		–		–	12	–	12	.500
Georgetown		–		–	13	–	13	.500
Oklahoma City		–		–	13	–	13	.500
Virginia Tech		–		–	13	–	13	.500
Indiana State		–		–	12	–	14	.462
Loyola Chicago		–		–	12	–	14	.462
Niagara		–		–	12	–	14	.462
Tulane		–		–	12	–	14	.462
Air Force		–		–	11	–	13	.458
Iona		–		–	11	–	13	.458
St. Francis (NY)		–		–	11	–	13	.458
Fairleigh Dickinson		–		–	11	–	14	.440
Hardin-Simmons		–		–	11	–	14	.440
South Florida		–		–	11	–	14	.440
Denver		–		–	11	–	15	.423
Southern Mississippi		–		–	11	–	15	.423
Navy		–		–	9	–	13	.409
West Virginia		–		–	10	–	15	.400
Fordham		–		–	8	–	17	.320
Northern Illinois		–		–	8	–	17	.320
Eastern Michigan		–		–	8	–	18	.308
Holy Cross		–		–	8	–	18	.308
Saint Peter's		–		–	8	–	18	.308
Xavier		–		–	8	–	18	.308
Villanova		–		–	7	–	19	.269
Army		–		–	6	–	18	.250
Houston Baptist		–		–	6	–	19	.240
Cleveland State		–		–	6	–	20	.231
Samford		–		–	6	–	20	.231
Buffalo		–		–	5	–	20	.200
Georgia Tech		–		–	5	–	21	.192
Georgia State		–		–	1	–	25	.038
Rankings from AP Poll

The 1973–74 Centenary Gents basketball team represented Centenary College of Louisiana as an NCAA Division I Independent during the 1973–74 college basketball season. The team was coached by Larry Little and played their home games at Gold Dome in Shreveport, Louisiana. Led by sophomore center Robert Parish, future Naismith Memorial Basketball Hall of Fame and College Basketball Hall of Fame inductee, the Gents finished with an overall record of 21–4.

== Roster ==
1973–74 Centenary Gentlemen men's basketball team
Players
Coaches

Pos.	#	Name	Height	Weight	Year	Previous school	Hometown
C	00	Robert Parish	7 ft 0 in (2.13 m)	220 lb (100 kg)	So	Woodlawn HS	Shreveport, Louisiana
		Nate Bland	—	—	So
		Leon Johnson	—	—	Jr		Newark, New Jersey
		Barry McLeod	—	—	So
		John Pitts	—	—	Fr

Head coach

- Larry Little

Assistant coach(es)

Legend

- (C) Team captain
- (S) Suspended
- (I) Ineligible
- (W) Walk-on
- Injured
- Current redshirt

== Schedule and results ==
Date time, TV	Rank^{#}	Opponent^{#}	Result	Record	High points	High rebounds	High assists	Site city, state
Regular Season
Nov 30, 1973*		Louisiana Tech; Sports Foundation Tournament	W 102–68	1–0	–	–	–	Gold Dome; Shreveport, Louisiana
Dec 1, 1973*		McNeese State; Sports Foundation Tournament	W 82–72	2–0	–	–	–	Gold Dome; Shreveport, Louisiana
Dec, 1973*		Dallas Baptist	W 93–88	3–0	–	–	–	Gold Dome; Shreveport, Louisiana
Dec, 1973*		Henderson State	W 87–68	4–0	–	–	–	Gold Dome; Shreveport, Louisiana
Dec, 1973*		Northwestern State	W 86–72	5–0	–	–	–	Gold Dome; Shreveport, Louisiana
Dec 22, 1973*		at Texas	W 97–94	6–0	–	–	–	Gregory Gym; Austin, Texas
Jan 3, 1974*		at Arkansas	W 98–96	7–0	–	–	–	Barnhill Arena; Fayetteville, Arkansas
Jan, 1974*		at Southern Mississippi	W 85–81	8–0	–	–	–	Reed Green Coliseum; Hattiesburg, Mississippi
Jan, 1974*		Northeast Louisiana	W 95–79	9–0	–	–	–	Gold Dome; Shreveport, Louisiana
Jan, 1974*		at Northwestern State	W 90–77	10–0	–	–	–	Prather Coliseum; Natchitoches, Louisiana
Jan 17, 1974*		Houston	W 91–83	11–0	–	26 – Parish	–	Gold Dome; Shreveport, Louisiana
Jan 19, 1974*		at Lamar	W 83–65	12–0	–	–	–	McDonald Gym; Beaumont, Texas
Jan 21, 1974*	No. 18	at Virginia Commonwealth	L 79–82	12–1	–	–	–	Franklin Street Gym; Richmond, Virginia
Jan 26, 1974*	No. 18	Southern Mississippi	W 103–87	13–1	–	–	–	Gold Dome; Shreveport, Louisiana
Jan 28, 1974*		at Hardin-Simmons	W 77–66	14–1	–	–	–	Taylor County Expo Center; Abilene, Texas
Jan 30, 1974*		at Arizona	L 88–97	14–2	–	–	–	McKale Center; Tucson, Arizona
Feb 2, 1974*		at Indiana State	L 78–87	14–3	–	–	–	Hulman Center; Terre Haute, Indiana
Feb 4, 1974*		at Southern Illinois	W 67–65	15–3	–	–	–	SIU Arena; Carbondale, Illinois
Feb 6, 1974*		Portland	W 86–65	16–3	–	–	–	Gold Dome; Shreveport, Louisiana
Feb, 1974*		at Loyola Chicago	W 93–85	17–3	–	–	–	Alumni Gym; Chicago, Illinois
Feb, 1974*		at Houston Baptist	W 88–78	18–3	–	–	–	Sharp Gymnasium; Houston, Texas
Feb 16, 1974*		Lamar	W 85–68	19–3	–	–	–	Gold Dome; Shreveport, Louisiana
Feb 23, 1974*		at Houston	L 89–105	19–4	–	–	–	Hofheinz Pavilion; Houston, Texas
Mar 3, 1974*		at Houston Baptist	W 79–78	20–4	–	–	–	Sharp Gymnasium; Houston, Texas
Mar, 1974*		Hardin-Simmons	W 106–94	21–4	–	–	–	Gold Dome; Shreveport, Louisiana
*Non-conference game. ^{#}Rankings from AP Poll. (#) Tournament seedings in parentheses.

== Awards and honors ==
- Robert Parish – Third-Team All-American (NABC), Honorable Mention All-American (AP)
