= 1973–74 Notre Dame Fighting Irish men's basketball team =

American college basketball season

1973–74 Notre Dame Fighting Irish men's basketball

NCAA Men's Division I Tournament, 3rd place
- Conference: Independent

Ranking
- Coaches: No. 3
- AP: No. 5
- Record: 26–3
- Head coach: Digger Phelps (3rd season)
- Assistant coach: Dick DiBiaso (3rd season)
- Captains: Gary Novak; John Shumate
- Home arena: Joyce Center

1973–74 NCAA Division I men's basketball independents standings
	Conf.				Overall
Team	W		L	PCT	W		L	PCT
No. 5 Notre Dame		–		–	26	–	3	.897
No. 8 Providence		–		–	28	–	4	.875
No. 16 Pittsburgh		–		–	25	–	4	.862
UNC Charlotte		–		–	22	–	4	.846
Centenary		–		–	21	–	4	.840
Marquette		–		–	26	–	5	.839
No. 19 South Carolina		–		–	22	–	5	.815
No. 18 Oral Roberts		–		–	23	–	6	.793
South Alabama		–		–	22	–	6	.786
Creighton		–		–	23	–	7	.767
St. John's		–		–	20	–	7	.741
Georgia Southern		–		–	19	–	7	.731
Southern Illinois		–		–	19	–	7	.731
Syracuse		–		–	19	–	7	.731
VCU		–		–	17	–	7	.708
Cincinnati		–		–	19	–	8	.704
Boston College		–		–	21	–	9	.700
Florida State		–		–	18	–	8	.692
Rutgers		–		–	18	–	8	.692
No. 20 Dayton		–		–	20	–	9	.690
Hawaii		–		–	19	–	9	.679
Jacksonville		–		–	20	–	10	.667
Manhattan		–		–	18	–	9	.667
Mercer		–		–	16	–	8	.667
Detroit		–		–	17	–	9	.654
Fairfield		–		–	17	–	9	.654
Houston		–		–	17	–	9	.654
Illinois State		–		–	17	–	9	.654
Marshall		–		–	17	–	9	.654
St. Bonaventure		–		–	17	–	9	.654
Stetson		–		–	17	–	9	.654
DePaul		–		–	16	–	9	.640
Memphis State		–		–	19	–	11	.633
Northeast Louisiana		–		–	16	–	10	.615
Utah State		–		–	16	–	10	.615
Colgate		–		–	15	–	10	.600
Portland State		–		–	16	–	11	.593
Seton Hall		–		–	16	–	11	.593
Pan American		–		–	13	–	9	.591
George Washington		–		–	15	–	11	.577
Portland		–		–	15	–	11	.577
Saint Francis (PA)		–		–	15	–	11	.577
Ball State		–		–	14	–	12	.538
Butler		–		–	14	–	12	.538
Canisius		–		–	14	–	12	.538
Milwaukee		–		–	14	–	12	.538
Penn State		–		–	14	–	12	.538
Northeastern		–		–	12	–	11	.522
Long Island		–		–	13	–	12	.520
Duquesne		–		–	12	–	12	.500
Georgetown		–		–	13	–	13	.500
Oklahoma City		–		–	13	–	13	.500
Virginia Tech		–		–	13	–	13	.500
Indiana State		–		–	12	–	14	.462
Loyola Chicago		–		–	12	–	14	.462
Niagara		–		–	12	–	14	.462
Tulane		–		–	12	–	14	.462
Air Force		–		–	11	–	13	.458
Iona		–		–	11	–	13	.458
St. Francis (NY)		–		–	11	–	13	.458
Fairleigh Dickinson		–		–	11	–	14	.440
Hardin-Simmons		–		–	11	–	14	.440
South Florida		–		–	11	–	14	.440
Denver		–		–	11	–	15	.423
Southern Mississippi		–		–	11	–	15	.423
Navy		–		–	9	–	13	.409
West Virginia		–		–	10	–	15	.400
Fordham		–		–	8	–	17	.320
Northern Illinois		–		–	8	–	17	.320
Eastern Michigan		–		–	8	–	18	.308
Holy Cross		–		–	8	–	18	.308
Saint Peter's		–		–	8	–	18	.308
Xavier		–		–	8	–	18	.308
Villanova		–		–	7	–	19	.269
Army		–		–	6	–	18	.250
Houston Baptist		–		–	6	–	19	.240
Cleveland State		–		–	6	–	20	.231
Samford		–		–	6	–	20	.231
Buffalo		–		–	5	–	20	.200
Georgia Tech		–		–	5	–	21	.192
Georgia State		–		–	1	–	25	.038
Rankings from AP Poll

The 1973–74 Notre Dame Fighting Irish men's basketball team represented the University of Notre Dame during the 1973–74 season. The team was coached by Digger Phelps and was ranked in the Associated Press poll for the entirety of the season. On January 19, the Fighting Irish defeated UCLA 71–70, ending the Bruins' record 88-game winning streak.

Forward John Shumate was the team's captain and leading scorer, averaging 24.2 points per game. After the season, Shumate was selected as a first-team player on the 1974 All-America team.

The team finished 26–3, losing by a 77–68 score against Michigan in the NCAA tournament, and going on to finish third in the Mideast Regional.

== Roster ==
1973–74 Notre Dame Fighting Irish men's basketball team
Players
Coaches

Pos.	#	Name	Height	Weight	Year	Hometown
C	54	Roger Anderson	6 ft 10 in (2.08 m)	225 lb (102 kg)	So	St. Paul, Minnesota
G	25	Gary Brokaw	6 ft 4 in (1.93 m)	180 lb (82 kg)	Jr	New Brunswick, New Jersey
G	15	Dwight Clay	6 ft 0 in (1.83 m)	170 lb (77 kg)	Jr	Pittsburgh, Pennsylvania
C	40	Peter Crotty	6 ft 8 in (2.03 m)	190 lb (86 kg)	Jr	Rockville Centre, New York
F	44	Adrian Dantley	6 ft 5 in (1.96 m)	210 lb (95 kg)	Fr	Washington, D. C.
G/F	31	Bill Drew	6 ft 5 in (1.96 m)	185 lb (84 kg)	Fr	Centereach, New York
G	22	Thomas Hansen	6 ft 2 in (1.88 m)	175 lb (79 kg)	Sr	Erie, Pennsylvania
F/C	43	Toby Knight	6 ft 9 in (2.06 m)	210 lb (95 kg)	Fr	Shoreham, NY
G	23	Dave Kuzmicz	6 ft 3 in (1.91 m)	185 lb (84 kg)	Fr	South Bend, Indiana
G	21	Ray Martin	6 ft 1 in (1.85 m)	170 lb (77 kg)	Fr	Long Island City, NY
F	35	Gary Novak	6 ft 7 in (2.01 m)	195 lb (88 kg)	Sr	LaSalle County, Illinois
F	55	Bill Paterno	6 ft 6 in (1.98 m)	205 lb (93 kg)	Fr	Spring Lake, NJ
F	42	Greg Schmelzer	6 ft 6 in (1.98 m)	205 lb (93 kg)	Sr	Park Ridge, Illinois
C	51	Myron Schuckman	6 ft 9 in (2.06 m)	210 lb (95 kg)	So	McCracken, Kansas
F	34	John Shumate	6 ft 9 in (2.06 m)	230 lb (104 kg)	Jr	Elizabeth, New Jersey
F	41	Chris Stevens	6 ft 6 in (1.98 m)	200 lb (91 kg)	Sr	Washington, D. C.
G	24	Tom Varga	5 ft 11 in (1.8 m)	170 lb (77 kg)	Jr	South Bend, Indiana
F	33	Ken Wolbeck	6 ft 7 in (2.01 m)	205 lb (93 kg)	Sr	Peoria, Illinois

Head coach

- Digger Phelps

Assistant coach(es)

Legend

- (C) Team captain
- (S) Suspended
- (I) Ineligible
- (W) Walk-on
- Injured
- Current redshirt

== Schedule and results ==
Date time, TV	Rank^{#}	Opponent^{#}	Result	Record	Site city, state
December 1		Valparaiso	W 112–62	1–0	Joyce Center; Notre Dame, IN
December 3		at Ohio State	W 76–72	2–0	St. John Arena; Columbus, Ohio
December 6		at Northwestern	W 98–74	3–0	Welsh-Ryan Arena; Evanston, Illinois
December 8		Saint Louis	W 94–65	4–0	Joyce Center; Notre Dame, IN
December 11		at Indiana	W 73–67	5–0	Assembly Hall; Bloomington, Indiana
December 20		Denver	W 99–59	6–0	Joyce Center; Notre Dame, IN
December 29		at Kentucky	W 94–79	7–0	Freedom Hall; Louisville, Kentucky
January 12		Xavier	W 87–44	8–0	Joyce Center; Notre Dame, IN
January 15		Georgetown	W 104–77	9–0	Joyce Center; Notre Dame, IN
January 19		UCLA	W 71–70	10–0	Joyce Center; Notre Dame, IN
January 22		at Kansas	W 76–74	11–0	Allen Fieldhouse; Lawrence, Kansas
January 24		Saint Francis (PA)	W 78–58	12–0	Joyce Center; Notre Dame, IN
January 26		at UCLA	L 75–94	12–1	Pauley Pavilion; Los Angeles, CA
January 29		Marquette	W 69–63	13–1	Joyce Center; Notre Dame, IN
January 31		DePaul	W 101–72	14–1	Joyce Center; Notre Dame, IN
February 2		Davidson	W 95–84	15–1	Joyce Center; Notre Dame, IN
February 4		at Michigan State	W 91–89	16–1	Jenison Fieldhouse; East Lansing, Michigan
February 6		at La Salle	W 98–78	17–1	Tom Gola Arena; Philadelphia, Pennsylvania
February 9		Duke	W 87–68	18–1	Joyce Center; Notre Dame, IN
February 14		at Fordham	W 79–69	19–1	Rose Hill Gym; The Bronx, NY
February 16		at South Carolina	W 72–68	20–1	Carolina Coliseum; Columbia, SC
February 18		Western Michigan	W 85–68	21–1	Joyce Center; Notre Dame, IN
February 23		West Virginia	W 108–80	22–1	Joyce Center; Notre Dame, IN
February 26		Ball State	W 93–69	23–1	Joyce Center; Notre Dame, IN
March 2		Villanova	W 115–85	24–1	Joyce Center; Notre Dame, IN
March 4	No. 2	at Dayton	L 82–97	24–2	University of Dayton Arena (13,528); Dayton, Ohio
March 9		vs. Austin Peay; NCAA Tournament • Regional First round	W 108–66	25–2	Hulman Center; Terre Haute, Indiana
March 14		vs. Michigan; NCAA Tournament • Regional semifinal	L 68–77	25–3	Coleman Coliseum; Tuscaloosa, Alabama
March 16		vs. Vanderbilt; NCAA Tournament • Regional Third Place	W 118–88	26–3	Coleman Coliseum; Tuscaloosa, Alabama
*Non-conference game. ^{#}Rankings from AP Poll. (#) Tournament seedings in parentheses.

== Team players drafted into the NBA ==
Round	Pick	Player	NBA club
1	4	John Shumate	Phoenix Suns
1	18	Gary Brokaw	Milwaukee Bucks
5	75	Gary Novak	Cleveland Cavaliers
