= 1973–74 Georgetown Hoyas men's basketball team =

American college basketball season

1973–74 Georgetown Hoyas men's basketball
- Conference: Independent
- Record: 13–13
- Head coach: John Thompson (2nd season)
- Assistant coaches: Bill Stein (2nd season); Frank Fuqua (1st season)
- Home arena: McDonough Gymnasium

1973–74 NCAA Division I men's basketball independents standings
| | Conf. | | | | Overall |
| Team | W | | L | PCT | W | | L | PCT |
|---|---|---|---|---|---|---|---|---|
| No. 5 Notre Dame | | – | | – | 26 | – | 3 | .897 |
| No. 8 Providence | | – | | – | 28 | – | 4 | .875 |
| No. 16 Pittsburgh | | – | | – | 25 | – | 4 | .862 |
| UNC Charlotte | | – | | – | 22 | – | 4 | .846 |
| Centenary | | – | | – | 21 | – | 4 | .840 |
| Marquette | | – | | – | 26 | – | 5 | .839 |
| No. 19 South Carolina | | – | | – | 22 | – | 5 | .815 |
| No. 18 Oral Roberts | | – | | – | 23 | – | 6 | .793 |
| South Alabama | | – | | – | 22 | – | 6 | .786 |
| Creighton | | – | | – | 23 | – | 7 | .767 |
| St. John's | | – | | – | 20 | – | 7 | .741 |
| Georgia Southern | | – | | – | 19 | – | 7 | .731 |
| Southern Illinois | | – | | – | 19 | – | 7 | .731 |
| Syracuse | | – | | – | 19 | – | 7 | .731 |
| VCU | | – | | – | 17 | – | 7 | .708 |
| Cincinnati | | – | | – | 19 | – | 8 | .704 |
| Boston College | | – | | – | 21 | – | 9 | .700 |
| Florida State | | – | | – | 18 | – | 8 | .692 |
| Rutgers | | – | | – | 18 | – | 8 | .692 |
| No. 20 Dayton | | – | | – | 20 | – | 9 | .690 |
| Hawaii | | – | | – | 19 | – | 9 | .679 |
| Jacksonville | | – | | – | 20 | – | 10 | .667 |
| Manhattan | | – | | – | 18 | – | 9 | .667 |
| Mercer | | – | | – | 16 | – | 8 | .667 |
| Detroit | | – | | – | 17 | – | 9 | .654 |
| Fairfield | | – | | – | 17 | – | 9 | .654 |
| Houston | | – | | – | 17 | – | 9 | .654 |
| Illinois State | | – | | – | 17 | – | 9 | .654 |
| Marshall | | – | | – | 17 | – | 9 | .654 |
| St. Bonaventure | | – | | – | 17 | – | 9 | .654 |
| Stetson | | – | | – | 17 | – | 9 | .654 |
| DePaul | | – | | – | 16 | – | 9 | .640 |
| Memphis State | | – | | – | 19 | – | 11 | .633 |
| Northeast Louisiana | | – | | – | 16 | – | 10 | .615 |
| Utah State | | – | | – | 16 | – | 10 | .615 |
| Colgate | | – | | – | 15 | – | 10 | .600 |
| Portland State | | – | | – | 16 | – | 11 | .593 |
| Seton Hall | | – | | – | 16 | – | 11 | .593 |
| Pan American | | – | | – | 13 | – | 9 | .591 |
| George Washington | | – | | – | 15 | – | 11 | .577 |
| Portland | | – | | – | 15 | – | 11 | .577 |
| Saint Francis (PA) | | – | | – | 15 | – | 11 | .577 |
| Ball State | | – | | – | 14 | – | 12 | .538 |
| Butler | | – | | – | 14 | – | 12 | .538 |
| Canisius | | – | | – | 14 | – | 12 | .538 |
| Milwaukee | | – | | – | 14 | – | 12 | .538 |
| Penn State | | – | | – | 14 | – | 12 | .538 |
| Northeastern | | – | | – | 12 | – | 11 | .522 |
| Long Island | | – | | – | 13 | – | 12 | .520 |
| Duquesne | | – | | – | 12 | – | 12 | .500 |
| Georgetown | | – | | – | 13 | – | 13 | .500 |
| Oklahoma City | | – | | – | 13 | – | 13 | .500 |
| Virginia Tech | | – | | – | 13 | – | 13 | .500 |
| Indiana State | | – | | – | 12 | – | 14 | .462 |
| Loyola Chicago | | – | | – | 12 | – | 14 | .462 |
| Niagara | | – | | – | 12 | – | 14 | .462 |
| Tulane | | – | | – | 12 | – | 14 | .462 |
| Air Force | | – | | – | 11 | – | 13 | .458 |
| Iona | | – | | – | 11 | – | 13 | .458 |
| St. Francis (NY) | | – | | – | 11 | – | 13 | .458 |
| Fairleigh Dickinson | | – | | – | 11 | – | 14 | .440 |
| Hardin-Simmons | | – | | – | 11 | – | 14 | .440 |
| South Florida | | – | | – | 11 | – | 14 | .440 |
| Denver | | – | | – | 11 | – | 15 | .423 |
| Southern Mississippi | | – | | – | 11 | – | 15 | .423 |
| Navy | | – | | – | 9 | – | 13 | .409 |
| West Virginia | | – | | – | 10 | – | 15 | .400 |
| Fordham | | – | | – | 8 | – | 17 | .320 |
| Northern Illinois | | – | | – | 8 | – | 17 | .320 |
| Eastern Michigan | | – | | – | 8 | – | 18 | .308 |
| Holy Cross | | – | | – | 8 | – | 18 | .308 |
| Saint Peter's | | – | | – | 8 | – | 18 | .308 |
| Xavier | | – | | – | 8 | – | 18 | .308 |
| Villanova | | – | | – | 7 | – | 19 | .269 |
| Army | | – | | – | 6 | – | 18 | .250 |
| Houston Baptist | | – | | – | 6 | – | 19 | .240 |
| Cleveland State | | – | | – | 6 | – | 20 | .231 |
| Samford | | – | | – | 6 | – | 20 | .231 |
| Buffalo | | – | | – | 5 | – | 20 | .200 |
| Georgia Tech | | – | | – | 5 | – | 21 | .192 |
| Georgia State | | – | | – | 1 | – | 25 | .038 |
Rankings from AP Poll

The 1973–74 Georgetown Hoyas men's basketball team represented Georgetown University during the 1973–74 NCAA Division I college basketball season. John Thompson, coached them in his second season as head coach. The team was an independent and played its home games at McDonough Gymnasium on the Georgetown campus in Washington, D.C. A young and inexperienced team, it played inconsistently, finished the season with a record of 13–13, and had no post-season play.

== Season recap ==
Sophomore center Merlin Wilson had posted scoring and rebounding statistics unprecedented in Georgetown basketball history during his freshman year, drawing national attention. Opponents paid extra attention to defending against him this season, and foul trouble limited his performance in the early games. Thompson moved him to power forward in January 1974, and this allowed him to return to form, with 23 points and 16 rebounds against Chicago State and 23 rebounds each in games a week apart against Holy Cross and Penn State. He averaged 15.5 rebounds per game for the season, a school record still well beyond the average posted by any other Hoya.

Sophomore guard Jonathan Smith led the team in scoring this season, finishing with 466 points, the third-highest total in a single season for a Georgetown player. He scored 20 or more points numerous times, averaged 25 points per game in the latter part of the season, and scored a season-high 32 points against Connecticut on February 16, 1974.

Sophomore forward Bill Lynn had seen little action as a reserve the previous season, but a back injury to forward Mark Gallagher that ended Gallagher's Georgetown career gave Lynn more playing time this year. He finished the season second on the team in both scoring and rebounding with an average of 13 points and 8.1 rebounds per game, including 20 points and nine rebounds against 2nd-ranked Notre Dame and 28 points and 18 rebounds against Boston College.

Freshman forward Larry Long scored a career-high 25 points against Boston College and finished the year averaging 7.1 points per game. He started every game, but an injury he suffered at St. Joseph's was the beginning of many injuries that would hamper him for the rest of his collegiate career.

The 1973–74 squad was not ranked in the Top 20 in the Associated Press Poll or Coaches' Poll at any time. It was the last Georgetown men's basketball team to finish a season without a winning record until the 1998–99 season. It also was the last one to have no post-season play in the NCAA Division I men's basketball tournament or the National Invitation Tournament (NIT) until the 2001–02 team declined an invitation to the 2002 NIT, and the last one to receive no invitation to either the NCAA tournament or the NIT until the 2003–04 season.

== Roster ==
| # | Name | Height | Weight (lbs.) | Position | Class | Hometown | Previous Team(s) |
|---|---|---|---|---|---|---|---|
| 10 | Tim Lambour | 5'8" | N/A | G | Sr. | Altoona, PA, U.S. | Bishop Guilfoyle HS |
| 12 | Alonzo Holloway | 5'5" | N/A | G | Fr. | Washington, DC, U.S. | St. Anthony's HS |
| 14 | Bill Lynn | 6'9" | 185 | F | So. | Washington, DC, U.S. | Spingarn HS |
| 20 | Mike Stokes | 6'2" | N/A | G | So. | Washington, DC, U.S. | St. John's College HS |
| 22 | Rick Kentz | 6'1" | N/A | G | Sr. | Summit, NJ, U.S. | Delbarton School |
| 24 | Emmet Fitzgerald | 5'9" | N/A | G | Fr. | Philadelphia, PA, U.S. | Malvern Preparatory School |
| 30 | Jonathan Smith | 6'1" | 185 | G | So. | Washington, DC, U.S. | St. Anthony's HS |
| 32 | Larry Long | 6'7" | 200 | F | Fr. | Washington, DC, U.S. | Mackin HS |
| 34 | Mike MacDermott | 6'4" | N/A | G | Fr. | Saratoga Springs, NY, U.S. | St. Peter HS |
| 40 | Greg Brooks | 6'6" | N/A | G | So. | Washington, DC, U.S. | St. Anthony's HS |
| 42 | Aaron Long | 6'2" | N/A | G | So. | Washington, DC, U.S. | St. Anthony's HS |
| 44 | Merlin Wilson | 6'9" | 215 | C | So. | Washington, DC, U.S. | St. Anthony's HS |
| 50 | Paul Robinson | 6'6" | N/A | F | Sr. | New York, NY, U.S. | DeWitt Clinton HS |
| 52 | Art Williamson | 6'8" | N/A | F | Fr. | Cleveland, OH, U.S. | University School |

== 1973–74 schedule and results ==
| Date time, TV | Rank^{#} | Opponent^{#} | Result | Record | Site city, state |
Regular Season
| Fri., Nov. 30, 1973 no, no | | Saint Leo | W 66–58 | 1-0 | McDonough Gymnasium; Washington, DC |
| Sun., Dec. 2, 1973 no, no | | Wheeling Jesuit | W 84–72 | 2-0 | McDonough Gymnasium; Washington, DC |
| Wed., Dec. 5, 1973 no, no | | at St. Bonaventure | L 68–75 | 2-1 | Reilly Center; Olean, NY |
| Sat., Dec. 8, 1973 no, no | | St. John's | W 85–82 ^{OT} | 3-1 | McDonough Gymnasium; Washington, DC |
| Tue., Dec. 11, 1973 no, no | | at No. 4 Maryland | L 83–115 | 3-2 | Cole Field House; College Park, MD |
| Wed., Jan. 2, 1974 no, no | | Chicago State | W 100–71 | 4-2 | McDonough Gymnasium; Washington, DC |
| Sat., Jan. 5, 1974 no, no | | at Seton Hall | L 78–81 | 4-3 | Walsh Gymnasium; South Orange, NJ |
| Wed., Jan. 9, 1974 no, no | | at Navy | L 55–56 | 4-4 | Halsey Field House; Annapolis, MD |
| Tue., Jan. 15, 1974 no, no | | at No. 2 Notre Dame | L 77–104 | 4-5 | Athletic & Convocation Center; Notre Dame, IN |
| Sat., Jan. 19, 1974 no, no | | Boston University | W 77–52 | 5-5 | McDonough Gymnasium; Washington, DC |
| Tue., Jan. 22, 1974 no, no | | Fairfield | L 71–75 | 5-6 | McDonough Gymnasium; Washington, DC |
| Sat., Jan. 26, 1974 no, no | | Holy Cross | L 70–73 | 5-7 | McDonough Gymnasium; Washington, DC |
| Tue., Jan. 29, 1974 no, no | | Dickinson | W 65–53 | 6-7 | McDonough Gymnasium; Washington, DC |
| Thu., Jan. 31, 1974 no, no | | Siena | W 70–56 | 7-7 | McDonough Gymnasium; Washington, DC |
| Sat., Feb. 2, 1974 no, no | | Penn State | W 63–58 | 8-7 | McDonough Gymnasium; Washington, DC |
| Tue., Feb. 5, 1974 no, no | | at St. Joseph's | L 64–70 | 8-8 | Alumni Memorial Fieldhouse; Philadelphia, PA |
| Sat., Feb. 9, 1974 no, no | | Rutgers | W 57–55 | 9-8 | McDonough Gymnasium; Washington, DC |
| Mon., Feb. 11, 1974 no, no | | Assumption | L 63–72 | 9-9 | McDonough Gymnasium; Washington, DC |
| Thu., Feb. 14, 1974 no, no | | Loyola Maryland | W 74–67 | 10-9 | McDonough Gymnasium; Washington, DC |
| Sat., Feb. 16, 1974 no, no | | Connecticut; Rivalry | W 67–66 | 11-9 | McDonough Gymnasium; Washington, DC |
| Tue., Feb. 19, 1974 no, no | | American | W 77–68 | 12-9 | McDonough Gymnasium; Washington, DC |
| Thu., Feb. 21, 1974 no, no | | at Saint Peter's | W 88–73 | 13-9 | Jersey City Armory; Jersey City, NJ |
| Sat., Feb. 23, 1974 no, no | | at Fordham | L 62–64 | 13-10 | Rose Hill Gymnasium; Bronx, NY |
| Tue., Feb. 26, 1974 no, no | | George Washington | L 54–55 | 13-11 | McDonough Gymnasium; Washington, DC |
| Sat., Mar. 2, 1974 no, no | | at Boston College | L 68–92 | 13-12 | Roberts Center; Chestnut Hill, MA |
| Wed., Mar. 6, 1974 no, no | | Saint Francis | L 62–78 | 13-13 | McDonough Gymnasium; Washington, DC |
*Non-conference game. ^{#}Rankings from AP Poll. (#) Tournament seedings in parentheses.
