= 1973–74 Ohio Bobcats men's basketball team =

American college basketball season

1973–74 Ohio Bobcats men's basketball

MAC Regular Season champions

NCAA Tournament, First Round
- Conference: Mid-American Conference
- Record: 16–11 (11–3 MAC)
- Head coach: Jim Snyder (25th season)
- Home arena: Convocation Center

1973–74 Mid-American Conference men's basketball standings
	Conf.				Overall
Team	W		L	PCT	W		L	PCT
Ohio	9	–	3	.750	16	–	11	.593
Toledo	8	–	4	.667	19	–	9	.679
Bowling Green State	7	–	5	.583	15	–	11	.577
Central Michigan	6	–	6	.500	14	–	12	.538
Miami (Ohio)	6	–	6	.500	13	–	13	.500
Western Michigan	5	–	7	.417	13	–	13	.500
Kent State	1	–	11	.083	9	–	17	.346
Rankings from AP Poll

The 1973–74 Ohio Bobcats men's basketball team represented Ohio University as a member of the Mid-American Conference in the college basketball season of 1973–74. The team was coached by Jim Snyder, in his 25th and final season at Ohio, and played their home games at Convocation Center. The Bobcats finished with a record of 16–11 and won MAC regular season title with a conference record of 9–3. They received a bid to the NCAA Tournament. There they lost to Marquette in the First Round.

== Schedule ==
Date time, TV	Rank^{#}	Opponent^{#}	Result	Record	Site (attendance) city, state
Regular Season
12/1/1973*		Northwestern	L 81–83	0–1	
12/5/1973*		Marietta	W 80–53	1–1	
12/8/1973		No. 16 Eastern Michigan	W 73–54	2–1 (1–0)	
12/18/1973*		at Utah	L 68–70	2–2	
12/21/1973*		at No. 1 UCLA	L 63–110	2–3	
12/22/1973*		at No. 16 Southern California	L 68–80	2–4	
12/29/1973*		at Ohio State	W 84–79	3–4	
MAC regular season
1/2/1974		Ball State	W 99–88	4–4 (2–0)	
1/5/1974		at Kent State	W 81–75	5–4 (3–0)	
1/7/1974*		Loyola (IL)	W 76–65	6–4	
1/9/1974*		at No. 13 Wisconsin	L 68–69	6–5	
1/12/1974		Toledo	W 82–72	7–5 (4–0)	
1/16/1974		at Miami (OH)	W 73–71	8–5 (5–0)	
1/19/1974		Western Michigan	W 97–55	9–5 (6–0)	
1/23/1974*		at Cleveland State	W 102–78	10-5	
1/26/1974		at Central Michigan	L 83–84	10-6 (6-1)	
1/30/1974		Bowling Green	L 66–74	10–7 (6–2)	
2/2/1974		Kent State	W 95–65	11–7 (7–2)	
2/5/1974*		at Cincinnati	L 80–82	11–8	
2/9/1974		at Toledo	L 79–80	11–9 (7–3)	
2/13/1974		Miami (OH)	W 85–70	12–9 (8–3)	
2/16/1974		at Western Michigan	W 78–76	13–9 (9–3)	
2/18/1974*		at Fairfield	L 80–91	13–10	
2/23/1974		Central Michigan	W 79–78 ^{OT}	14–10 (10–3)	
2/26/1974*		at Penn State	W 78–69	15–10	
3/2/1974		at Bowling Green	W 71–70	16–10 (11–3)	
NCAA Tournament
3/9/1974*		vs. No. 11 Marquette	L 59–85	16–11	
*Non-conference game. ^{#}Rankings from AP Poll. (#) Tournament seedings in parentheses. All times are in Eastern Time.

== Statistics ==
=== Team statistics ===
Final 1973–74 statistics

Record	Ohio	OPP
Scoring	2128	2027
Scoring Average	78.81	75.07
Field goals – Att	875–1933	872–1893
Free throws – Att	378–548	283–415
Rebounds	1188	1070
Assists		
Turnovers		
Steals		
Blocked Shots		

=== Player statistics ===
			Minutes		Scoring		Total FGs			Free-Throws			Rebounds						
Player	GP	GS	Tot	Avg	Pts	Avg	FG	FGA	Pct	FT	FTA	Pct	Tot	Avg	A	PF	TO	Stl	Blk
Walter Luckett	27	-			617	22.9	254	524	0.485	109	150	0.727	159	5.9		82			
Bill Brown	27	-			383	14.2	157	319	0.492	69	87	0.793	159	5.9		55			
George Green	27	-			312	11.6	127	269	0.472	58	84	0.690	279	10.3		79			
Larry Slappy	27	-			209	7.7	90	226	0.398	29	45	0.644	65	2.4		63			
Denny Rusch	22	-			169	7.7	61	138	0.442	47	71	0.662	139	6.3		77			
Ulice Payne	27	-			165	6.1	74	176	0.420	17	31	0.548	109	4.0		39			
Dave Ball	26	-			152	5.8	63	173	0.364	26	44	0.591	112	4.3		46			
Denny Thompson	26	-			51	2.0	21	52	0.404	9	12	0.750	17	0.7		27			
Mike Corde	12	-			20	1.7	8	16	0.500	4	5	0.800	4	0.3		4			
Tom Hester	10	-			18	1.8	6	12	0.500	6	9	0.667	8	0.8		6			
Alan Talbert	8	-			15	1.9	6	14	0.429	3	5	0.600	4	0.5		2			
Doug Jauch		-																	
Dave Strack		-																	
Total	27	-	-	-	2128	78.8	875	1933	0.453	378	548	0.690	1188	44.0		0			
Opponents	27	-	-	-	2027	75.1	872	1893	0.461	283	415	0.682	1070	39.6					

Legend
GP	Games played	GS	Games started	Avg	Average per game
FG	Field-goals made	FGA	Field-goal attempts	Off	Offensive rebounds
Def	Defensive rebounds	A	Assists	TO	Turnovers
Blk	Blocks	Stl	Steals	High	Team high
