= 1973–74 Creighton Bluejays men's basketball team =

American college basketball season

1973–74 Creighton Bluejays men's basketball
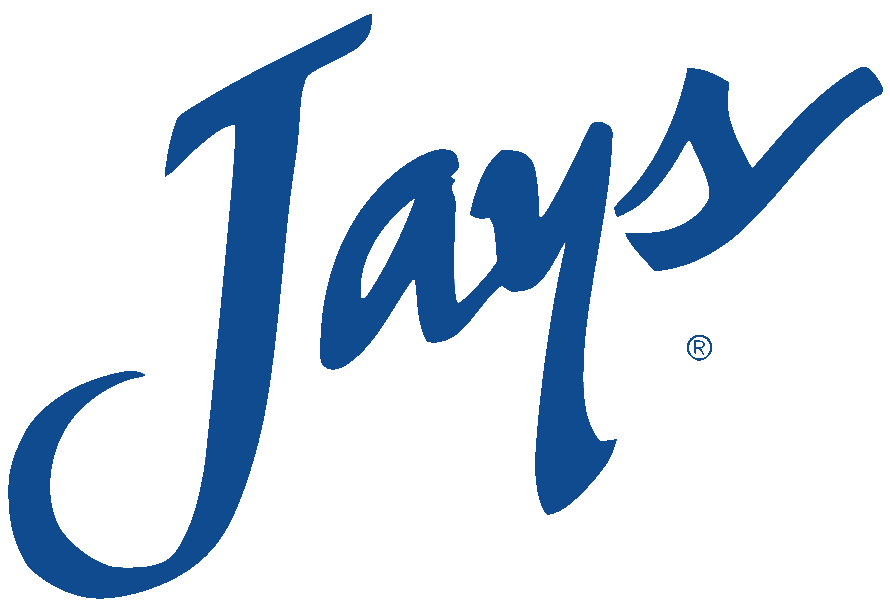

1974 NCAA Tournament, Sweet Sixteen
- Conference: Independent

Ranking
- Coaches: No. 17
- Record: 23–7
- Head coach: Eddie Sutton (5th season)
- Assistant coaches: Tom Apke; Tom Brosnihan
- Home arena: Omaha Civic Auditorium

The 1973–74 Creighton Bluejays men's basketball team represented Creighton University during the NCAA Division I collegiate men's basketball season. The Bluejays, led by fifth-year head coach Eddie Sutton, played their home games at the Omaha Civic Auditorium. Creighton finished with a 23–7 record and earned a spot in the 1974 NCAA tournament. Placed in the Midwest Region, the Jays won their first round game against the University of Texas at Austin but lost in the regional semifinal by one point against Kansas. Creighton won the Midwest Region third-place game against Louisville.

This was Sutton's last year as head coach of the Bluejays as he would take the head coaching job at the University of Arkansas. He would be replaced by Creighton assistant coach Tom Apke.

1973–74 NCAA Division I men's basketball independents standings
	Conf.				Overall
Team	W		L	PCT	W		L	PCT
No. 5 Notre Dame		–		–	26	–	3	.897
No. 8 Providence		–		–	28	–	4	.875
No. 16 Pittsburgh		–		–	25	–	4	.862
UNC Charlotte		–		–	22	–	4	.846
Centenary		–		–	21	–	4	.840
Marquette		–		–	26	–	5	.839
No. 19 South Carolina		–		–	22	–	5	.815
No. 18 Oral Roberts		–		–	23	–	6	.793
South Alabama		–		–	22	–	6	.786
Creighton		–		–	23	–	7	.767
St. John's		–		–	20	–	7	.741
Georgia Southern		–		–	19	–	7	.731
Southern Illinois		–		–	19	–	7	.731
Syracuse		–		–	19	–	7	.731
VCU		–		–	17	–	7	.708
Cincinnati		–		–	19	–	8	.704
Boston College		–		–	21	–	9	.700
Florida State		–		–	18	–	8	.692
Rutgers		–		–	18	–	8	.692
No. 20 Dayton		–		–	20	–	9	.690
Hawaii		–		–	19	–	9	.679
Jacksonville		–		–	20	–	10	.667
Manhattan		–		–	18	–	9	.667
Mercer		–		–	16	–	8	.667
Detroit		–		–	17	–	9	.654
Fairfield		–		–	17	–	9	.654
Houston		–		–	17	–	9	.654
Illinois State		–		–	17	–	9	.654
Marshall		–		–	17	–	9	.654
St. Bonaventure		–		–	17	–	9	.654
Stetson		–		–	17	–	9	.654
DePaul		–		–	16	–	9	.640
Memphis State		–		–	19	–	11	.633
Northeast Louisiana		–		–	16	–	10	.615
Utah State		–		–	16	–	10	.615
Colgate		–		–	15	–	10	.600
Portland State		–		–	16	–	11	.593
Seton Hall		–		–	16	–	11	.593
Pan American		–		–	13	–	9	.591
George Washington		–		–	15	–	11	.577
Portland		–		–	15	–	11	.577
Saint Francis (PA)		–		–	15	–	11	.577
Ball State		–		–	14	–	12	.538
Butler		–		–	14	–	12	.538
Canisius		–		–	14	–	12	.538
Milwaukee		–		–	14	–	12	.538
Penn State		–		–	14	–	12	.538
Northeastern		–		–	12	–	11	.522
Long Island		–		–	13	–	12	.520
Duquesne		–		–	12	–	12	.500
Georgetown		–		–	13	–	13	.500
Oklahoma City		–		–	13	–	13	.500
Virginia Tech		–		–	13	–	13	.500
Indiana State		–		–	12	–	14	.462
Loyola Chicago		–		–	12	–	14	.462
Niagara		–		–	12	–	14	.462
Tulane		–		–	12	–	14	.462
Air Force		–		–	11	–	13	.458
Iona		–		–	11	–	13	.458
St. Francis (NY)		–		–	11	–	13	.458
Fairleigh Dickinson		–		–	11	–	14	.440
Hardin-Simmons		–		–	11	–	14	.440
South Florida		–		–	11	–	14	.440
Denver		–		–	11	–	15	.423
Southern Mississippi		–		–	11	–	15	.423
Navy		–		–	9	–	13	.409
West Virginia		–		–	10	–	15	.400
Fordham		–		–	8	–	17	.320
Northern Illinois		–		–	8	–	17	.320
Eastern Michigan		–		–	8	–	18	.308
Holy Cross		–		–	8	–	18	.308
Saint Peter's		–		–	8	–	18	.308
Xavier		–		–	8	–	18	.308
Villanova		–		–	7	–	19	.269
Army		–		–	6	–	18	.250
Houston Baptist		–		–	6	–	19	.240
Cleveland State		–		–	6	–	20	.231
Samford		–		–	6	–	20	.231
Buffalo		–		–	5	–	20	.200
Georgia Tech		–		–	5	–	21	.192
Georgia State		–		–	1	–	25	.038
Rankings from AP Poll

== Roster ==
Number	Name	Position	Height	Weight	Year	Hometown
10	James Pietro	Guard	5-10	167	Senior	Pittsburgh, Pennsylvania
20	Brian Long	Guard	5-10	155	Sophomore	New York, New York
21	Charles Butler	Forward	6-4	180	Junior	Indianola, Mississippi
22	Jerry Massie	Guard	6–2	175	Senior	Indianapolis, Indiana
24	Cornell Smith	Forward	6-5	185	Freshman	Chicago, Illinois
25	Tom Anderson	Forward	6-4	186	Junior	Arlington, Nebraska
31	Richie Smith	Guard	6-1	180	Senior	Campbell, Minnesota
41	Doug Brookins	Center	6-8	236	Junior	New Paris, Indiana
42	Wayne Groves	Center	6-7	204	Junior	East Orange, New Jersey
43	Ted Wuebben	Forward	6-6	195	Senior	Dayton, Ohio
44	Gene Harmon	Forward	6-6	224	Senior	Schuyler, Nebraska
52	Ralph Bobik	Forward	6-7	200	Senior	Lake Arrowhead, California
53	Daryl Heeke	Forward	6-7	215	Sophomore	Spearville, Kansas
54	Mike Heck	Center	7-0	200	Sophomore	Papillion, Nebraska

== Schedule ==
Date time, TV	Rank^{#}	Opponent^{#}	Result	Record	Site (attendance) city, state
Regular Season
11/30/1973		Regis	W 93-38	1–0	Omaha Civic Auditorium (-); Omaha, Nebraska
12/04/1973		South Dakota State	W 95-68	2–0	Omaha Civic Auditorium (-); Omaha, Nebraska
12/07/1973		Air Force	W 55-42	3–0	Omaha Civic Auditorium (-); Omaha, Nebraska
12/08/1973		Oklahoma	L 70-73	3-1	Omaha Civic Auditorium (-); Omaha, Nebraska
12/15/1973		Saint Francis (PA)	L 58-73	3-2	Omaha Civic Auditorium (-); Omaha, Nebraska
12/17/1973		BYU	W 99-86	4-2	Omaha Civic Auditorium (-); Omaha, Nebraska
12/19/1973		at Augustana	W 68-49	5-2	(-); Sioux Falls, South Dakota
12/22/1973		at Colorado	L 68-73	5-3	Balch Fieldhouse (-); Boulder, Colorado
12/29/1973		Drake	W 75-53	6-3	Omaha Civic Auditorium (-); Omaha, Nebraska
01/03/1974		San Diego State	W 79-61	7-3	Omaha Civic Auditorium (-); Omaha, Nebraska
01/05/1974		at Butler	W 75-58	8-3	Hinkle Fieldhouse (-); Indianapolis, Indiana
01/07/1974		at Southern Illinois	W 75-60	9-3	(-); Carbondale, Illinois
01/12/1974		Dayton	W 69-62	10-3	Omaha Civic Auditorium (4,697); Omaha, Nebraska
1/17/1974		at Wichita State	W 65-63	11-3	The Roundhouse (-); Wichita, Kansas
1/19/1974		at Arizona State	L 64-77	11–4	Sun Devil Gym (-); Tempe, Arizona
1/22/1974		Bradley	W 79-53	12–4	Omaha Civic Auditorium (-); Omaha, Nebraska
1/24/1974		at St. Louis	W 60-54	13–4	Kiel Auditorium (-); St. Louis, Missouri
1/26/1974		Southern Illinois	W 67-64	14-4	Omaha Civic Auditorium (-); Omaha, Nebraska
1/29/1974		St. Cloud State	W 82-54	15-4	Omaha Civic Auditorium (-); Omaha, Nebraska
2/02/1974		Duquesne	W 67-61	16-4	Omaha Civic Auditorium (-); Omaha, Nebraska
2/04/1974		St. Thomas	W 81-47	17–4	Omaha Civic Auditorium (-); Omaha, Nebraska
2/09/1974		at No. 6 Marquette	W 75-69	18–4	Milwaukee Arena (-); Milwaukee, Wisconsin
2/11/1974		St. John's	W 81-43	19–4	Omaha Civic Auditorium (-); Omaha, Nebraska
2/19/1974	No. 15	at UC Irvine	W 83-52	20-4	(-); Irvine, California
2/22/1974	No. 15	at Hawaii	W 63-59	21-4	(-); Honolulu, Hawaii
2/23/1974	No. 15	at Hawaii	L 60-61	21-5	(-); Honolulu, Hawaii
3/04/1974	No. 16	No. 14 South Carolina	L 69-78	21-6	Omaha Civic Auditorium (-); Omaha, Nebraska
1974 NCAA Tournament
03/09/1974	No. 19	vs. Texas; Midwest Region Quarterfinals	W 77-61	22-6	(-); Denton, Texas
03/14/1974	No. 19	vs. No. 14 Kansas; Midwest Region Semifinals	L 54-55	22-7	Mabee Center (-); Tulsa, Oklahoma
03/16/1964	No. 19	vs. No. 16 Louisville; Midwest Region Third Place Game	W 80-71	23-7	(-); Tulsa, Oklahoma

== Rankings ==
Ranking movement Legend: ██ Improvement in ranking. ██ Decrease in ranking. RV=Others receiving votes.
Poll	Pre	Wk 1	Wk 2	Wk 3	Wk 4	Wk 5	Wk 6	Wk 7	Wk 8	Wk 9	Wk 10	Wk 11	Wk 12	Wk 13	Wk 14	Wk 15	Wk 16	Final
AP												#17	#15	#16	#19	#19		
Coaches											#18	#18	#16	#16	#18	#17		#17
