= 1973–74 Dayton Flyers men's basketball team =

American college basketball season

1973–74 Dayton Flyers men's basketball

NCAA tournament, Sweet Sixteen
- Conference: Independent

Ranking
- Coaches: No. 19
- AP: No. 20
- Record: 20–9
- Head coach: Don Donoher
- Home arena: Thomas J. Frericks Center

1973–74 NCAA Division I men's basketball independents standings
	Conf.				Overall
Team	W		L	PCT	W		L	PCT
No. 5 Notre Dame		–		–	26	–	3	.897
No. 8 Providence		–		–	28	–	4	.875
No. 16 Pittsburgh		–		–	25	–	4	.862
UNC Charlotte		–		–	22	–	4	.846
Centenary		–		–	21	–	4	.840
Marquette		–		–	26	–	5	.839
No. 19 South Carolina		–		–	22	–	5	.815
No. 18 Oral Roberts		–		–	23	–	6	.793
South Alabama		–		–	22	–	6	.786
Creighton		–		–	23	–	7	.767
St. John's		–		–	20	–	7	.741
Georgia Southern		–		–	19	–	7	.731
Southern Illinois		–		–	19	–	7	.731
Syracuse		–		–	19	–	7	.731
VCU		–		–	17	–	7	.708
Cincinnati		–		–	19	–	8	.704
Boston College		–		–	21	–	9	.700
Florida State		–		–	18	–	8	.692
Rutgers		–		–	18	–	8	.692
No. 20 Dayton		–		–	20	–	9	.690
Hawaii		–		–	19	–	9	.679
Jacksonville		–		–	20	–	10	.667
Manhattan		–		–	18	–	9	.667
Mercer		–		–	16	–	8	.667
Detroit		–		–	17	–	9	.654
Fairfield		–		–	17	–	9	.654
Houston		–		–	17	–	9	.654
Illinois State		–		–	17	–	9	.654
Marshall		–		–	17	–	9	.654
St. Bonaventure		–		–	17	–	9	.654
Stetson		–		–	17	–	9	.654
DePaul		–		–	16	–	9	.640
Memphis State		–		–	19	–	11	.633
Northeast Louisiana		–		–	16	–	10	.615
Utah State		–		–	16	–	10	.615
Colgate		–		–	15	–	10	.600
Portland State		–		–	16	–	11	.593
Seton Hall		–		–	16	–	11	.593
Pan American		–		–	13	–	9	.591
George Washington		–		–	15	–	11	.577
Portland		–		–	15	–	11	.577
Saint Francis (PA)		–		–	15	–	11	.577
Ball State		–		–	14	–	12	.538
Butler		–		–	14	–	12	.538
Canisius		–		–	14	–	12	.538
Milwaukee		–		–	14	–	12	.538
Penn State		–		–	14	–	12	.538
Northeastern		–		–	12	–	11	.522
Long Island		–		–	13	–	12	.520
Duquesne		–		–	12	–	12	.500
Georgetown		–		–	13	–	13	.500
Oklahoma City		–		–	13	–	13	.500
Virginia Tech		–		–	13	–	13	.500
Indiana State		–		–	12	–	14	.462
Loyola Chicago		–		–	12	–	14	.462
Niagara		–		–	12	–	14	.462
Tulane		–		–	12	–	14	.462
Air Force		–		–	11	–	13	.458
Iona		–		–	11	–	13	.458
St. Francis (NY)		–		–	11	–	13	.458
Fairleigh Dickinson		–		–	11	–	14	.440
Hardin-Simmons		–		–	11	–	14	.440
South Florida		–		–	11	–	14	.440
Denver		–		–	11	–	15	.423
Southern Mississippi		–		–	11	–	15	.423
Navy		–		–	9	–	13	.409
West Virginia		–		–	10	–	15	.400
Fordham		–		–	8	–	17	.320
Northern Illinois		–		–	8	–	17	.320
Eastern Michigan		–		–	8	–	18	.308
Holy Cross		–		–	8	–	18	.308
Saint Peter's		–		–	8	–	18	.308
Xavier		–		–	8	–	18	.308
Villanova		–		–	7	–	19	.269
Army		–		–	6	–	18	.250
Houston Baptist		–		–	6	–	19	.240
Cleveland State		–		–	6	–	20	.231
Samford		–		–	6	–	20	.231
Buffalo		–		–	5	–	20	.200
Georgia Tech		–		–	5	–	21	.192
Georgia State		–		–	1	–	25	.038
Rankings from AP Poll

The 1973–74 Dayton Flyers men's basketball team represented the University of Dayton during the 1973–74 men's college basketball season.

== Roster ==
1973–74 Dayton Flyers men's basketball team
Players
Coaches

Pos.	#	Name	Height	Weight	Year	Hometown
G	21	Harold Coleman	6 ft 4 in (1.93 m)	185 lb (84 kg)	Fr	Pittsburgh, Pennsylvania
G	14	Johnny Davis	6 ft 2 in (1.88 m)	165 lb (75 kg)	Fr	Detroit, Michigan
F	44	Allen Elijah	6 ft 8 in (2.03 m)	195 lb (88 kg)	Jr	Detroit, Michigan
F	33	Joe Fisher	6 ft 8 in (2.03 m)	220 lb (100 kg)	Jr	Lima, Ohio
C	32	Dan Herling	6 ft 7 in (2.01 m)	200 lb (91 kg)	Jr	Philadelphia, Pennsylvania
F	45	Jerome Holland	6 ft 7 in (2.01 m)	182 lb (83 kg)	Fr	Dayton, Ohio
F	12	Dan Klawonn	6 ft 6 in (1.98 m)	195 lb (88 kg)	Fr	Union, Ohio
G	30	Leighton Moulton	6 ft 4 in (1.93 m)	165 lb (75 kg)	So	River Rouge, Michigan
G	10	Donald Smith	6 ft 0 in (1.83 m)	160 lb (73 kg)	Sr	Dayton, Ohio
F	20	Mike Sylvester	6 ft 5 in (1.96 m)	215 lb (98 kg)	Sr	Cincinnati, Ohio
F	40	Jim Testerman	6 ft 8 in (2.03 m)	220 lb (100 kg)	Jr	Loveland, Ohio
F	42	Rick Thalls	6 ft 8 in (2.03 m)	205 lb (93 kg)	So	Richmond, Indiana
C	25	John Von Lehman	6 ft 8 in (2.03 m)	220 lb (100 kg)	Sr	Covington, Kentucky

Head coach

- Don Donoher

Assistant coach(es)

Legend

- (C) Team captain
- (S) Suspended
- (I) Ineligible
- (W) Walk-on
- Injured
- Current redshirt

== Schedule ==
Date time, TV	Rank^{#}	Opponent^{#}	Result	Record	Site city, state
Non-conference regular season
Dec 1, 1973; 8:15 p.m.		St. Joseph’s (IN)	W 97–71	1–0	University of Dayton Arena (12,157); Dayton, OH
Dec 5, 1973; 8:15 p.m.		at No. 9 Louisville	L 68–75	1–1	Freedom Hall (10,994); Louisville, KY
Dec 8, 1973		vs. Long Island	W 80–69	2–1	Madison Square Garden (5,239); New York, NY
Dec 10, 1973		Pepperdine	W 69–61	3–1	University of Dayton Arena (10,458); Dayton, OH
Dec 15, 1973		at Michigan	L 54–76	3–2	Crisler Arena (4,352); Ann Arbor, MI
Dec 21, 1973		Georgia	W 63–55	4–2	University of Dayton Arena (11,138); Dayton, OH
Dec 22, 1973		California	W 66–62	5–2	University of Dayton Arena (11,512); Dayton, OH
Dec 29, 1973		Seattle	W 74–65	6–2	University of Dayton Arena (12,171); Dayton, OH
Jan 2, 1974		Miami (OH)	W 73–57	7–2	University of Dayton Arena (11,812); Dayton, OH
Jan 5, 1974		St. John's	W 82–58	8–2	University of Dayton Arena (12,252); Dayton, OH
Jan 9, 1974		at Xavier	W 62–52	9–2	Cincinnati Gardens (3,375); Cincinnati, OH
Jan 12, 1974		at Creighton	L 62–69	9–3	Omaha Civic Auditorium (4,697); Omaha, NE
Jan 14, 1974		Loyola (IL)	W 74–59	10–3	University of Dayton Arena (11,208); Dayton, OH
Jan 19, 1974		at Detroit Mercy	L 72–79 ^{OT}	10–4	Calihan Hall (4,890); Detroit, MI
Jan 23, 1974; 8:15 p.m.		No. 14 Louisville	L 72–90	10–5	University of Dayton Arena (12,340); Dayton, OH
Jan 26, 1974		DePaul	W 85–71	11–5	University of Dayton Arena (11,856); Dayton, OH
Jan 30, 1974		Cincinnati	W 91–79	12–5	University of Dayton Arena (13,084); Dayton, OH
Feb 2, 1974		VMI	W 76–60	13–5	University of Dayton Arena (11,538); Dayton, OH
Feb 4, 1974		at Western Kentucky	L 83–87	13–6	E. A. Diddle Arena (7,500); Bowling Green, KY
Feb 9, 1974		at No. 13 South Carolina	L 68–81	13–7	Carolina Coliseum (11,983); Columbia, SC
Feb 11, 1974		at South Florida	W 79–77 ^{OT}	14–7	Curtis Hixon Hall (1,098); Tampa, FL
Feb 17, 1974		Chattanooga	W 87–62	15–7	University of Dayton Arena (11,959); Dayton, OH
Feb 23, 1974		Xavier	W 79–77	16–7	University of Dayton Arena (11,702); Dayton, OH
Feb 25, 1974		at Miami (OH)	W 79–74	17–7	Millett Hall (3,434); Oxford, OH
Mar 2, 1974		Northern Michigan	W 73–59	18–7	University of Dayton Arena (12,094); Dayton, OH
Mar 4, 1974		No. 2 Notre Dame	W 97–82	19–7	University of Dayton Arena (13,528); Dayton, OH
NCAA Tournament
Mar 9, 1974*		vs. Cal State Los Angeles	W 88–80	20–7	Holt Arena (9,400); Pocatello, ID
Mar 14, 1974*	No. 20	vs. No. 2 UCLA; Regional semifinal	L 100–111 ^{3OT}	20–8	McKale Center (13,314); Tucson, AZ
Mar 16, 1974*	No. 20	vs. No. 17 New Mexico	L 61–66	20–9	McKale Center (13,658); Tucson, AZ
*Non-conference game. ^{#}Rankings from AP Poll. (#) Tournament seedings in parentheses. All times are in Eastern.
