= 1973–74 Kansas Jayhawks men's basketball team =

American college basketball season

1973–74 Kansas Jayhawks men's basketball

Big Eight Champions

NCAA tournament, Final Four
- Conference: Big Eight Conference

Ranking
- Coaches: No. 10
- AP: No. 7
- Record: 23–7 (13–1 Big 8)
- Head coach: Ted Owens (10th season)
- Assistant coaches: Sam Miranda (8th season); Duncan Reid (1st season)
- Captains: Tom Kivisto; Dave Taynor
- Home arena: Allen Fieldhouse

1973–74 Big Eight Conference men's basketball standings
	Conf.				Overall
Team	W		L	PCT	W		L	PCT
No. 7 Kansas	13	–	1	.929	23	–	7	.767
Kansas State	11	–	3	.786	19	–	8	.704
Oklahoma	9	–	5	.643	18	–	8	.692
Nebraska	7	–	7	.500	14	–	12	.538
Iowa State	6	–	8	.429	15	–	11	.577
Colorado	4	–	10	.286	9	–	17	.346
Missouri	3	–	11	.214	12	–	14	.462
Oklahoma State	3	–	11	.214	9	–	17	.346
Rankings from AP Poll

The 1973–74 Kansas Jayhawks men's basketball team represented the University of Kansas during the 1973–74 NCAA Division I men's basketball season. The team finished with an overall record of 23–7 (13–1 Big 8) In the 1974 NCAA Tournament, Kansas advanced all the way to their 6th Final Four appearance. But the Jayhawks lost to Marquette in the semifinals then lost the third place game to UCLA.

== Roster ==
- Danny Knight
- Roger Morningstar
- Dale Greenlee
- Norm Cook
- Rick Suttle
- Tom Kivisto
- Tommie Smith
- Dave Taynor
- Nino Samuel
- Donnie Von Moore
- Reuben Shelton
- Jack Hollis
- Bob Emery
- Paul Werner
- Chris Barnthouse
- Dwight Haley

== Schedule ==
Date time, TV	Rank^{#}	Opponent^{#}	Result	Record	Site city, state
December 1*	No. 13	Murray State	W 103–71	1–0	Allen Fieldhouse; Lawrence, KS
December 3*	No. 13	No. 10 Kentucky	W 71–63	2–0	Allen Fieldhouse; Lawrence, KS
December 5*		No. 3 Indiana	L 59–72	2–1	Assembly Hall; Bloomington, IN
December 8*		Northern Iowa	W 94–60	3–1	Allen Fieldhouse; Lawrence, KS
December 14*		Washington State	W 66–51	4–1	Allen Fieldhouse; Lawrence, KS
December 15*		Oregon	W 67–49	5–1	Allen Fieldhouse; Lawrence, KS
December 22*		at No. 17 Vanderbilt	L 72–83	5–2	Memorial Gymnasium; Nashville, TN
December 26		vs. Colorado	L 71–73	5–3	Kemper Arena; Kansas City, MO
December 28		vs. Oklahoma	W 82–72	6–3	Municipal Auditorium; Kansas City, MO
December 29		vs. Nebraska	W 75–66	7–3	Kemper Arena; Kansas City, MO
January 2		at Iowa	W 72–71	8–3	Iowa Field House; Iowa City, IA
January 12*		Nebraska	W 79–64	9–3 (1–0)	Allen Fieldhouse; Lawrence, KS
January 14		at Iowa State	W 73–69	10–3 (2–0)	James H. Hilton Coliseum; Ames, IA
January 19		Oklahoma State	W 68–66	11–3 (3–0)	Allen Fieldhouse; Lawrence, KS
January 22*		No. 1 Notre Dame	L 74–76	11–4	Allen Fieldhouse; Lawrence, KS
January 25		at Oklahoma	W 82–79	12–4 (4–0)	McCasland Field House; Norman, OK
January 29	No. 18	at Missouri; Border War	W 80–67	13–4 (5–0)	Hearnes Center; Columbia, MO
February 4	No. 18	Colorado	W 81–66	14–4 (6–0)	Allen Fieldhouse; Lawrence, KS
February 9	No. 17	at Oklahoma State	W 80–71	15–4 (7–0)	Gallagher-Iba Arena; Stillwater, OK
February 13	No. 16	at Kansas State; Sunflower Showdown	L 71–74	15–5 (7–1)	Ahearn Field House; Manhattan, KS
February 16	No. 16	Iowa State	W 72–57	16–5 (8–1)	Allen Fieldhouse; Lawrence, KS
February 18	No. 16	Oklahoma	W 98–80	17–5 (9–1)	Allen Fieldhouse; Lawrence, KS
February 26	No. 15	at Nebraska	W 51–46	18–5 (10–1)	Nebraska Coliseum; Lincoln, NE
March 2	No. 15	at Colorado	W 70–68	19–5 (11–1)	Balch Fieldhouse; Boulder, CO
March 6	No. 15	Kansas State; Sunflower Showdown	W 60–55	20–5 (12–1)	Allen Fieldhouse; Lawrence, KS
March 9	No. 15	Missouri; Border War	W 112–76	21–5 (13–1)	Allen Fieldhouse; Lawrence, KS
March 14	No. 14	vs. No. 19 Creighton; NCAA Midwest Regional semifinals	W 55–54	22–5	Mabee Center; Tulsa, OK
March 16	No. 14	vs. Oral Roberts; NCAA Midwest Regional Finals	W 93–90 ^{OT}	23–5	Mabee Center; Tulsa, OK
March 23	No. 6	vs. No. 3 Marquette; NCAA national semifinals	L 51–64	23–6	Greensboro Coliseum; Greensboro, NC
March 25	No. 6	vs. No. 2 UCLA; NCAA National third-place game	L 61–78	23-7	Greensboro Coliseum; Greensboro, NC
*Non-conference game. ^{#}Rankings from AP Poll. (#) Tournament seedings in parentheses. Midwest=MW.
