= 1974 NCAA Division I basketball championship game =

1974 NCAA Tournament Championship Game
National championship game
NC State Wolfpack	Marquette Warriors
ACC	Independent
(29-1)	(26-4)
76	64
Head coach: Norm Sloan	Head coach: Al McGuire
- AP: 1
- Coaches: 1
- AP: 3
- Coaches: 5
	1st half	2nd half	Total
NC State Wolfpack	39	37	76
Marquette Warriors	30	34	64
- Date: March 25, 1974
- Venue: Greensboro Coliseum, Greensboro, North Carolina
- MVP: David Thompson, NC State

United States TV coverage
- Network: NBC
- Announcers: Curt Gowdy and Billy Packer

The 1974 NCAA Division I Basketball Championship Game was the finals of the 1974 NCAA Division I men's basketball tournament and it determined the national champion for the 1973-74 NCAA Division I men's basketball season. The game was played on March 25, 1974, at the Greensboro Coliseum in Greensboro, North Carolina and featured the NC State Wolfpack of the Atlantic Coast Conference, and the independent Marquette Warriors. This was the first national championship game since 1966 to not feature the UCLA Bruins.

NC State defeated Marquette to win their first national championship in program history, becoming only the second team from the ACC to win the national championship after North Carolina in 1957.

== Participating teams ==
=== NC State Wolfpack ===
- East
  - North Carolina State 92, Providence 78
  - North Carolina State 100, Pittsburgh 72
- Final Four
  - North Carolina State 80, UCLA 77 (2OT)

=== Marquette Warriors ===
- Mideast
  - Marquette 85, Ohio 59
  - Marquette 69, Vanderbilt 61
  - Marquette 72, Michigan 70
- Final Four
  - Marquette 64, Kansas 51

== Game summary ==
NBC

March 25, 1974

#1 NC State Wolfpack 76, #3 Marquette Warriors 64
Scoring by half: 39-30, 37-34
Pts: David Thompson 21; Rebs: Tommy Burleson 11; Asts: Moe Rivers 5	Pts: Maurice Lucas 21; Rebs: Maurice Lucas 13; Asts: Lloyd Walton, Ed Daniels 2

Greensboro Coliseum, Greensboro, North Carolina
