= 1974 NCAA Division I basketball tournament =

Edition of USA college basketball tournament

- NCAA logo from 1971 to 1979
- Season: 1973–74
- Teams: 25
- Finals site: Greensboro Coliseum, Greensboro, North Carolina
- Champions: NC State Wolfpack (1st title, 1st title game, 2nd Final Four)
- Runner-up: Marquette Warriors (1st title game, 1st Final Four)
- Semifinalists: Kansas Jayhawks (6th Final Four); UCLA Bruins (11th Final Four)
- Winning coach: Norm Sloan (1st title)
- MOP: David Thompson (NC State)
- Attendance: 154,112
- Top scorer: David Thompson (NC State) (97 points)

The 1974 NCAA Division I basketball tournament involved 25 schools playing in single-elimination play to determine the national champion of men's NCAA Division I college basketball. It was the first tournament to be designated as a Division I championship—previously, NCAA member schools had been divided into the "University Division" and "College Division". The NCAA created its current three-division setup, effective with the 1973–74 academic year, by moving all of its University Division schools to Division I and splitting the College Division members into Division II (fewer scholarships) and Division III (no athletic scholarships allowed). Previous tournaments would retroactively be considered Division I championships.

The 36th annual edition of the tournament began on March 9, 1974, and ended with the championship game on March 25, at Greensboro Coliseum in Greensboro, North Carolina. Until 2019, when Virginia defeated Texas Tech, 85–77 in overtime, it was the last tournament in which neither school had previously appeared in any national championship game at any level. A total of 29 games were played, including a third-place game in each region and a national third-place game.

North Carolina State, coached by Norm Sloan, won the national title with a 76–64 victory in the final game over Marquette, coached by Al McGuire. This result ended UCLA's record streak of seven consecutive titles. David Thompson of North Carolina State was named the tournament's Most Outstanding Player.

This was the final year that only conference champions and independents could participate in the tournament. During the same time in 1974, the Collegiate Commissioners' Association held a tournament in St. Louis, Missouri. They invited the second-place teams from eight conferences to participate. In 1975, the NCAA would expand the field to include at-large bids for conference runners-up.

== UCLA-North Carolina State semifinal ==
The UCLA – North Carolina State semifinal game made USA Today's 2002 list of the greatest NCAA tournament games of all time at #13. NC State won the tap to start the second overtime. The Wolfpack looked to score first and then possibly apply the four corners stall offense, but they missed their first three shots, were unable to get an offensive rebound, and committed a goaltending. UCLA scored on its first three possessions, with Bill Walton's four points on two free throws and a turnaround jumper, and Keith Wilkes' layin, which became a three-point play, off a perfect bounce feed from Tommy Curtis. With 3:27 remaining, the Bruins led 74–67, by 7 points, and seemed to have the game won.

But State's pesky, diminutive point guard, Monte Towe, began to create havoc, and with it started a wave of momentum which swung in the direction of the Pack, along with a supportive Greensboro crowd. He dribbled quickly into the front court, then stopped on a dime, and was fouled by Curtis from behind. With his usual style of not bouncing the ball at the line, Towe converted both shots, a quick start of a rally for his team. He then fouled Curtis, who made the first of the one and one, but missed the second, UCLA's first miss from the line in the game. Tim Stoddard rebounded, then David Thompson drove through the lane and tapped in the rebound of his own miss off the glass. In the backcourt, Towe immediately drew another foul on Curtis, an offensive foul and turnover. After a rebound, John Wooden called a timeout, but it may have backfired. The Wolfpack tightened the backcourt pressure and Curtis threw it back to Greg Lee who, trapped, made an errant throw past half court which was lost by Dave Meyers out of bounds. Then State's towering 7'4" center, Tom Burleson, rose high above and behind Walton for a rebound putback, and UCLA's lead was two.

A Walton forced pass into the paint was stolen by Moe Rivers off a deflection. Burleson was fouled with 1:38 to play and made the first before missing the second. State missed two shot attempts to take the lead, then Stoddard fouled out. The future major league baseball pitcher and World Series winner was disconsolate on the bench, but his teammates would respond. Meyers missed the front end of the 1&1, and Thompson jumped high for the rebound. Then, from the left of the free throw circle, he drifted right, then drove left on Wilkes and banked in his shot behind a Burleson screen. NC State now led, 76–75, with under a minute to go.

Lee missed an outside jumper and Wilkes, called for pushing off on the rebound, fouled out. Thompson converted both ends of a 1&1 with 34 seconds left. A Lee long inbounds pass was knocked away by Burleson, for another Rivers steal. Curtis fouled out with 12 seconds to go and Towe hit both free throws. Walton's jumper in the final seconds was too little, too late. Walton later called the 80–77 semifinal game the most disappointing outcome of his entire basketball career, given how UCLA lost a 5-point lead late in regulation and a 7-point lead in the 2nd overtime, before NC State rallied to win. The game, played in Greensboro, was like a home game for the Wolfpack; UCLA had defeated NC State by 18 points in a neutral site game in St. Louis (where UCLA defeated Memphis State the previous March to win its seventh consecutive national championship) earlier in the season.

== Tournament notes ==
The Wolfpack became the fifth team in history to win the national championship playing in its home state. CCNY won the 1950 NCAA championship (as well as the NIT championship) at Madison Square Garden in New York City, Kentucky won the 1958 championship at Freedom Hall in Louisville, and UCLA won both the 1968 and 1972 championships at the Los Angeles Memorial Sports Arena. UCLA also would win the 1975 championship in its home state, at the San Diego Sports Arena. No team has accomplished the feat since then, although the Kansas Jayhawks won the 1988 championship in nearby Kansas City, Missouri, at Kemper Arena, which is closer to the KU campus in Lawrence, Kansas than Greensboro is to Raleigh.

This was the last Sweet Sixteen appearance for Creighton and Oral Roberts until the 2021 tournament, when both teams returned for the first time in 47 years.

== Schedule and venues ==
The following are the sites that were selected to host each round of the 1974 tournament:

First round

- March 9
  - East Region
    - Alumni Hall, Jamaica, New York (Host: St. John's University)
    - WVU Coliseum, Morgantown, West Virginia (Host: West Virginia University)
    - The Palestra, Philadelphia, Pennsylvania (Hosts: University of Pennsylvania, Ivy League)
  - Mideast Region
    - Hulman Center, Terre Haute, Indiana (Host: Indiana State University)
  - Midwest Region
    - UNT Coliseum, Denton, Texas (Host: North Texas State University)
  - West Region
    - ASISU Minidome, Pocatello, Idaho (Hosts: Idaho State University, Big Sky Conference)

Regional semifinals, 3rd-place games, and finals (Sweet Sixteen and Elite Eight)

- March 14 and 16
  - East Regional, Reynolds Coliseum, Raleigh, North Carolina (Host: North Carolina State University)
  - Mideast Regional, Memorial Coliseum, Tuscaloosa, Alabama (Host: University of Alabama at Tuscaloosa)
  - Midwest Regional, Mabee Center, Tulsa, Oklahoma (Host: Oral Roberts University)
  - West Regional, McKale Center, Tucson, Arizona (Host: University of Arizona)

National semifinals, 3rd-place game, and championship (Final Four and championship)

- March 23 and 25
  - Greensboro Memorial Coliseum, Greensboro, North Carolina (Host: Atlantic Coast Conference)

== Teams ==
Region	Team	Coach	Conference	Finished	Final Opponent	Score
East
East	Furman	Joe Williams	Southern	Regional Fourth Place	Providence	L 95–83
East	NC State	Norm Sloan	Atlantic Coast	Champion	Marquette	W 76–64
East	Penn	Chuck Daly	Ivy League	First round	Providence	L 84–69
East	Pittsburgh	Buzz Ridl	Independent	Regional Runner-up	NC State	L 100–72
East	Providence	Dave Gavitt	Independent	Regional third place	Furman	W 95–83
East	South Carolina	Frank McGuire	Independent	First round	Furman	L 75–67
East	Saint Joseph's	Jack McKinney	Middle Atlantic	First round	Pittsburgh	L 54–42
Mideast
Mideast	Austin Peay	Lake Kelly	Ohio Valley	First round	Notre Dame	L 108–66
Mideast	Marquette	Al McGuire	Independent	Runner Up	NC State	L 76–64
Mideast	Michigan	Johnny Orr	Big Ten	Regional Runner-up	Marquette	L 72–70
Mideast	Notre Dame	Digger Phelps	Independent	Regional third place	Vanderbilt	W 118–88
Mideast	Ohio	James Snyder	Mid-American	First round	Marquette	L 85–59
Mideast	Vanderbilt	Roy Skinner	Southeastern	Regional Fourth Place	Notre Dame	L 118–88
Midwest
Midwest	Creighton	Eddie Sutton	Independent	Regional third place	Louisville	W 80–71
Midwest	Kansas	Ted Owens	Big Eight	Fourth Place	UCLA	L 78–61
Midwest	Louisville	Denny Crum	Missouri Valley	Regional Fourth Place	Creighton	L 80–71
Midwest	Oral Roberts	Ken Trickey	Independent	Regional Runner-up	Kansas	L 93–90
Midwest	Syracuse	Roy Danforth	Independent	First round	Oral Roberts	L 86–82
Midwest	Texas	Leon Black	Southwest	First round	Creighton	L 77–61
West
West	Cal State Los Angeles	Bob Miller	Pacific Coast	First round	Dayton	L 88–80
West	Dayton	Don Donoher	Independent	Regional Fourth Place	New Mexico	L 66–61
West	Idaho State	Jim Killingsworth	Big Sky	First round	New Mexico	L 73–65
West	New Mexico	Norm Ellenberger	Western Athletic	Regional third place	Dayton	W 66–61
West	San Francisco	Bob Gaillard	West Coast	Regional Runner-up	UCLA	L 83–60
West	UCLA	John Wooden	Pacific-8	Third Place	Kansas	W 78–61

== Bracket ==
* – Denotes overtime period

=== East region ===
Quarterfinals
Providence	84
Penn	69
Pittsburgh	54
Saint Joseph's	42
Furman	75
South Carolina	67

Semifinals
NC State	92
Providence	78
Pittsburgh	81
Furman	78

Finals
NC State	100
Pittsburgh	72
East Regional third place
Providence	95
Furman	83

=== Mideast region ===
Quarterfinals
Marquette	85
Ohio	59
Notre Dame	108
Austin Peay	66

Semifinals
Vanderbilt	61
Marquette	69
Michigan	77
Notre Dame	68

Finals
Marquette	72
Michigan	70
Mideast Regional third place
Vanderbilt	88
Notre Dame	118

=== Midwest region ===
Quarterfinals
Creighton	77
Texas	61
Oral Roberts	86
Syracuse	82*

Semifinals
Kansas	55
Creighton	54
Louisville	93
Oral Roberts	96

Finals
Kansas	93
Oral Roberts	90*
Midwest Regional third place
Creighton	80
Louisville	71

=== West region ===
Quarterfinals
Dayton	88
Cal State Los Angeles	80
New Mexico	73
Idaho State	65

Semifinals
UCLA	111***
Dayton	100
San Francisco	64
New Mexico	61

Finals
UCLA	83
San Francisco	60
West Regional third place
Dayton	61
New Mexico	66

=== Final Four ===
National semifinals Saturday, March 23
E	NC State	80**
W	UCLA	77
ME	Marquette	64
MW	Kansas	51

National Championship Game; Monday March 25
E	NC State	76
ME	Marquette	64
National third-place game
W	UCLA	78
MW	Kansas	61

== Announcers ==
Curt Gowdy, Tom Hawkins, Charlie Jones, and Ross Porter - First Round at Terre Haute, Indiana (Marquette-Ohio, Notre Dame-Austin Peay)); Mideast Regional Final at Tuscaloosa, Alabama; Final Four at Greensboro, North Carolina; Jones was used as a sideline reporter for the first round and Porter was used for the Final Four.

- Charlie Jones and Ross Porter - West Regional Final at Tucson, Arizona
- Jay Randolph and Pat Hernon - Midwest Regional Final at Tulsa, Oklahoma
- Bill O'Donnell and Billy Packer - East Regional Final at Raleigh, North Carolina

== See also ==
- 1974 NCAA Division II basketball tournament
- 1974 National Invitation Tournament
- 1974 NAIA basketball tournament
- 1974 National Women's Invitation Tournament
