= 1973–74 Louisville Cardinals men's basketball team =

American college basketball season

1973–74 Louisville Cardinals men's basketball

Missouri Valley Conference champions

NCAA tournament, Sweet Sixteen
- Conference: Missouri Valley Conference
- Record: 21–7 (11–1 MVC)
- Head coach: Denny Crum (3rd season)
- Home arena: Freedom Hall

1973–74 Missouri Valley Conference men's basketball standings
	Conf.				Overall
Team	W		L	PCT	W		L	PCT
Louisville	11	–	1	.917	21	–	7	.750
Bradley	9	–	3	.750	20	–	8	.714
Tulsa	7	–	6	.538	18	–	8	.692
New Mexico State	7	–	6	.538	14	–	11	.560
Wichita State	6	–	7	.462	11	–	15	.423
West Texas State	5	–	8	.385	11	–	15	.423
North Texas State	4	–	8	.333	13	–	13	.500
Saint Louis	4	–	8	.333	9	–	16	.360
Drake	3	–	9	.250	13	–	13	.500
Rankings from AP Poll

The 1973–74 Louisville Cardinals men's basketball team represented the University of Louisville in NCAA Division I men's competition in the 1973–74 season. Coached by Denny Crum, the Cardinals won the Missouri Valley Conference title and advanced to the NCAA tournament, losing to Oral Roberts in the regional semifinals.

The Cardinals played their home games at Freedom Hall, their home from the 1956–57 season until their move to the new KFC Yum! Center for the 2010–11 season.

== Schedule and results ==
Date time, TV	Rank^{#}	Opponent^{#}	Result	Record	Site city, state
Regular season
Dec 1, 1973*	No. 9	Cincinnati	L 58–65	0–1	Freedom Hall; Louisville, Kentucky
Dec 3, 1973*	No. 9	No. 14 Houston	W 87–81	1–1	Freedom Hall; Louisville, Kentucky
NCAA tournament
Mar 14, 1974*	No. 16	vs. Oral Roberts; Midwest Regional Semifinal – Sweet Sixteen	L 93–96	21–6	Mabee Center; Oklahoma City, Oklahoma
Mar 16, 1974*	No. 16	vs. No. 19 Creighton; Regional Consolation	L 71–80	21–7	Mabee Center; Oklahoma City, Oklahoma
*Non-conference game. ^{#}Rankings from AP Poll. (#) Tournament seedings in parentheses. MW=Midwest.
