= 1973–74 Marquette Warriors men's basketball team =

American college basketball season

1973–74 Marquette Warriors men's basketball

NCAA Men's Division I Tournament, Runner-up

National Championship Game, L 64-76 vs. NC State
- Conference: Independent

Ranking
- Coaches: No. 5
- AP: No. 3
- Record: 26–5
- Head coach: Al McGuire
- Assistant coaches: Hank Raymonds; Rick Majerus
- Home arena: Milwaukee Arena

1973–74 NCAA Division I men's basketball independents standings
	Conf.				Overall
Team	W		L	PCT	W		L	PCT
No. 5 Notre Dame		–		–	26	–	3	.897
No. 8 Providence		–		–	28	–	4	.875
No. 16 Pittsburgh		–		–	25	–	4	.862
UNC Charlotte		–		–	22	–	4	.846
Centenary		–		–	21	–	4	.840
Marquette		–		–	26	–	5	.839
No. 19 South Carolina		–		–	22	–	5	.815
No. 18 Oral Roberts		–		–	23	–	6	.793
South Alabama		–		–	22	–	6	.786
Creighton		–		–	23	–	7	.767
St. John's		–		–	20	–	7	.741
Georgia Southern		–		–	19	–	7	.731
Southern Illinois		–		–	19	–	7	.731
Syracuse		–		–	19	–	7	.731
VCU		–		–	17	–	7	.708
Cincinnati		–		–	19	–	8	.704
Boston College		–		–	21	–	9	.700
Florida State		–		–	18	–	8	.692
Rutgers		–		–	18	–	8	.692
No. 20 Dayton		–		–	20	–	9	.690
Hawaii		–		–	19	–	9	.679
Jacksonville		–		–	20	–	10	.667
Manhattan		–		–	18	–	9	.667
Mercer		–		–	16	–	8	.667
Detroit		–		–	17	–	9	.654
Fairfield		–		–	17	–	9	.654
Houston		–		–	17	–	9	.654
Illinois State		–		–	17	–	9	.654
Marshall		–		–	17	–	9	.654
St. Bonaventure		–		–	17	–	9	.654
Stetson		–		–	17	–	9	.654
DePaul		–		–	16	–	9	.640
Memphis State		–		–	19	–	11	.633
Northeast Louisiana		–		–	16	–	10	.615
Utah State		–		–	16	–	10	.615
Colgate		–		–	15	–	10	.600
Portland State		–		–	16	–	11	.593
Seton Hall		–		–	16	–	11	.593
Pan American		–		–	13	–	9	.591
George Washington		–		–	15	–	11	.577
Portland		–		–	15	–	11	.577
Saint Francis (PA)		–		–	15	–	11	.577
Ball State		–		–	14	–	12	.538
Butler		–		–	14	–	12	.538
Canisius		–		–	14	–	12	.538
Milwaukee		–		–	14	–	12	.538
Penn State		–		–	14	–	12	.538
Northeastern		–		–	12	–	11	.522
Long Island		–		–	13	–	12	.520
Duquesne		–		–	12	–	12	.500
Georgetown		–		–	13	–	13	.500
Oklahoma City		–		–	13	–	13	.500
Virginia Tech		–		–	13	–	13	.500
Indiana State		–		–	12	–	14	.462
Loyola Chicago		–		–	12	–	14	.462
Niagara		–		–	12	–	14	.462
Tulane		–		–	12	–	14	.462
Air Force		–		–	11	–	13	.458
Iona		–		–	11	–	13	.458
St. Francis (NY)		–		–	11	–	13	.458
Fairleigh Dickinson		–		–	11	–	14	.440
Hardin-Simmons		–		–	11	–	14	.440
South Florida		–		–	11	–	14	.440
Denver		–		–	11	–	15	.423
Southern Mississippi		–		–	11	–	15	.423
Navy		–		–	9	–	13	.409
West Virginia		–		–	10	–	15	.400
Fordham		–		–	8	–	17	.320
Northern Illinois		–		–	8	–	17	.320
Eastern Michigan		–		–	8	–	18	.308
Holy Cross		–		–	8	–	18	.308
Saint Peter's		–		–	8	–	18	.308
Xavier		–		–	8	–	18	.308
Villanova		–		–	7	–	19	.269
Army		–		–	6	–	18	.250
Houston Baptist		–		–	6	–	19	.240
Cleveland State		–		–	6	–	20	.231
Samford		–		–	6	–	20	.231
Buffalo		–		–	5	–	20	.200
Georgia Tech		–		–	5	–	21	.192
Georgia State		–		–	1	–	25	.038
Rankings from AP Poll

The 1973–74 Marquette Warriors men's basketball team represented Marquette University in NCAA Division I men's competition in the 1973–74 academic year.

At that time, Marquette was an independent school not aligned with any conference; it did not join a conference until 1988, when it joined the Midwestern Collegiate Conference, now known as the Horizon League; it would later move to the Great Midwest Conference and Conference USA before joining its current conference, the Big East, in 2005. Also, Marquette did not adopt its current nickname of "Golden Eagles" until 1994.

== Roster ==
1973–74 Marquette Warriors men's basketball team
Players
Coaches

Pos.	#	Name	Height	Weight	Year	Hometown
G	10	Barry Brennan	5 ft 10 in (1.78 m)	150 lb (68 kg)	So	Charlotte, North Carolina
G	21	John Bryant	6 ft 7 in (2.01 m)	190 lb (86 kg)	Fr	Aurora, Illinois
G	53	Rick Campbell	6 ft 5 in (1.96 m)	190 lb (86 kg)	Jr	Chicago, Illinois
G	33	Ed Daniels	6 ft 3 in (1.91 m)	190 lb (86 kg)	Sr	Savannah, Georgia
G	23	Dave Delsman	5 ft 10 in (1.78 m)	160 lb (73 kg)	Jr	Waukesha, Wisconsin
F	31	Bo Ellis	6 ft 9 in (2.06 m)	190 lb (86 kg)	Fr	Chicago, Illinois
F/C	45	Jerry Homan	6 ft 7 in (2.01 m)	205 lb (93 kg)	Jr	Wauwatosa, Wisconsin
F	51	Greg Johnson	6 ft 5 in (1.96 m)	175 lb (79 kg)	So	Milwaukee, Wisconsin
F	20	Maurice Lucas	6 ft 9 in (2.06 m)	205 lb (93 kg)	Jr	Pittsburgh, Pennsylvania
G	43	Earl Tatum	6 ft 5 in (1.96 m)	185 lb (84 kg)	So	Mount Vernon, New York
F	40	Paul Vollmer	6 ft 4 in (1.93 m)	180 lb (82 kg)	Jr	Wauwatosa, Wisconsin
G	22	Lloyd Walton	6 ft 0 in (1.83 m)	160 lb (73 kg)	So	Chicago, Illinois
G	55	Marcus Washington	6 ft 1 in (1.85 m)	160 lb (73 kg)	Sr	Lyons, Illinois

Head coach

- Al McGuire

Assistant coach(es)

- Hank Raymonds
- Rick Majerus

Legend

- (C) Team captain
- (S) Suspended
- (I) Ineligible
- (W) Walk-on
- Injured
- Current redshirt

== NCAA basketball tournament ==
- Mideast
  - Marquette 85, Ohio 59
  - Marquette 69, Vanderbilt 61
  - Marquette 72, Michigan 70
- Final Four
  - Marquette 64, Kansas 51
  - North Carolina State 76, Marquette 64

== Team players drafted into the NBA ==
Round	Pick	Player	NBA club
1	14	Maurice Lucas	Chicago Bulls
10	158	Marcus Washington	Houston Rockets
