= 1973–74 NCAA Division I men's basketball rankings =

- Season: 1973–74
- NCAA Tournament: 1974
- Preseason No. 1: UCLA
- NCAA Tournament Champions: NC State
NCAA Division I men's basketball rankings


The 1973–74 NCAA Division I men's basketball rankings was made up of two human polls, the AP Poll and the Coaches Poll, in addition to various other preseason polls.

== Legend ==
	Increase in ranking
	Decrease in ranking
	New to rankings from previous week
Italics	Number of first place votes
(#–#)	Win–loss record
т	Tied with team above or below also with this symbol

== AP Poll ==
The January 21, 1974 poll was the first where UCLA was not ranked #1 since the rankings on February 1, 1971 – a string of 46 consecutive AP polls that stretched across parts of four seasons. The Bruins would regain the top ranking for three more weeks before NC State would grab the top spot for the final six weeks.

	Preseason	Week 1 Dec. 3	Week 2 Dec. 10	Week 3 Dec. 17	Week 4 Dec. 24	Week 5 Dec. 31	Week 6 Jan. 7	Week 7 Jan. 14	Week 8 Jan. 21	Week 9 Jan. 28	Week 10 Feb. 4	Week 11 Feb. 11	Week 12 Feb. 18	Week 13 Feb. 25	Week 14 Mar. 4	Week 15 Mar. 11	Week 16 Mar. 18	Final Mar. 26	
1.	UCLA	UCLA (2–0)	UCLA (3–0)	UCLA (4–0)	UCLA (6–0)	UCLA (8–0)	UCLA (9–0)	UCLA (11–0)	Notre Dame (10–0)	UCLA (15–1)	UCLA (16–1)	UCLA (18–1)	NC State (20–1)	NC State (22–1)	NC State (24–1)	NC State (26–1)	NC State (28–1)	NC State (30–1)	1.
2.	NC State	NC State (0–0)	NC State (2–0)	Maryland (2–1)	Maryland (4–1)	Notre Dame (7–0)	Notre Dame (7–0)	Notre Dame (8–0)	UCLA (13–1)	NC State (13–1)	NC State (15–1)	NC State (17–1)	Notre Dame (20–1)	Notre Dame (22–1)	Notre Dame (24–1)	UCLA (23–3)	UCLA (25–3)	UCLA (26–4)	2.
3.	Indiana	Indiana (1–0)	Indiana (3–0)	Notre Dame (5–0)	Notre Dame (6–0)	Maryland (5–1)	Maryland (7–1)	NC State (9–1)	NC State (11–1)	Notre Dame (12–1)	Notre Dame (15–1)	Notre Dame (18–1)	UCLA (18–3)	UCLA (20–3)	UCLA (22–3)	Notre Dame (25–2)	Marquette (25–4)	Marquette (26–5)	3.
4.	Maryland	Maryland (0–1)	Maryland (1–1)	North Carolina (5–0)	North Carolina (6–0)	North Carolina (7–0)	NC State (7–1)	Maryland (8–2)	North Carolina (12–1)	North Carolina (14–2)	North Carolina (15–2)	North Carolina (17–2)	Vanderbilt (20–1)	North Carolina (20–3)	Maryland (21–4)	Maryland (23–5)	Maryland (23–5)	Maryland (23–5)	4.
5.	North Carolina	North Carolina (1–0)	North Carolina (2–0)	NC State (2–1)	NC State (3–1)	NC State (6–1)	North Carolina (7–1)	North Carolina (9–1)	Maryland (10–2)	Marquette (16–1)	Vanderbilt (16–1)	Vanderbilt (18–1)	Maryland (17–4)	Maryland (19–4)	Vanderbilt (23–2)	Providence (27–3)	Notre Dame (26–3)	Notre Dame (26–3)	5.
6.	Providence	Providence (1–0)	Notre Dame (4–0)	Marquette (5–0)	Marquette (7–0)	Marquette (9–0)	Vanderbilt (9–0)	Marquette (12–1)	Marquette (14–1)	Maryland (11–3)	Marquette (17–2)	Maryland (15–4)	North Carolina (18–3)	Vanderbilt (21–2)	North Carolina (21–4)	Vanderbilt (23–3)	Kansas (23–5)	Michigan (22–5)	6.
7.	Marquette	Marquette (1–0)	Marquette (4–0)	Indiana (4–1)	Indiana (5–1)	Alabama (6–1)	Marquette (10–1)	Providence (11–2)	Vanderbilt (12–1)	Vanderbilt (14–1)	Maryland (13–4)	Pittsburgh (19–1)	Pittsburgh (21–1)	Alabama (20–3)	USC (22–3)	Marquette (23–4)	Michigan (22–5)	Kansas (23–7)	7.
8.	Notre Dame	Notre Dame (1–0)	Providence (1–0)	Louisville (4–1)	Louisville (6–1)	Indiana (7–2)	New Mexico (12–0)	Vanderbilt (10–1)	Providence (13–2)	Alabama (13–2)	Alabama (15–2)	Alabama (16–3)	Alabama (18–3)	Marquette (21–3)	Providence (25–3)	North Carolina (22–5)	Providence (28–4)	Providence (28–4)	8.
9.	Louisville	Louisville (0–1)	Louisville (3–1)	Providence (3–1)	Providence (6–1)	Long Beach State (9–1)	Long Beach State (10–1)	Long Beach State (12–1)	Alabama (10–2)	Providence (15–2)	Long Beach State (16–2)	Marquette (18–3)	Marquette (19–3)	Indiana (18–3)	Long Beach State (23–2)	Long Beach State (23–2)	Long Beach State (23–2)	Indiana (23–5)	9.
10.	Kentucky	Kentucky (1–0)	Memphis State (4–0)	Alabama (3–0)	Long Beach State (7–1)	Vanderbilt (8–0)	Providence (9–2)	Alabama (9–2)	Long Beach State (12–1)	Long Beach State (14–2)	Pittsburgh (17–1)	Long Beach State (18–2)	Indiana (16–3)	USC (20–3)	South Carolina (21–4)	Indiana (20–4)	North Carolina (22–6)	Long Beach State (23–2)	10.
11.	San Francisco	San Francisco (1–1)	Penn (3–0)	Long Beach State (5–1)	Vanderbilt (7–0)	USC (9–1)	Louisville (8–2)	South Carolina (9–2)	Indiana (11–3)	USC (14–2)	Providence (16–3)	Providence (18–3)	Providence (21–3)	Pittsburgh (22–2)	Marquette (22–4)	Alabama (22–4)	Indiana (21–5)	Purdue (21–9)	11.
12.	Long Beach State	Long Beach State (1–0)	Long Beach State (2–1)	Memphis State (6–1)	Arizona (5–1)	New Mexico (10–0)	Alabama (6–2)	Indiana (9–3)	USC (12–2)	Indiana (12–3)	Indiana (13–3)	Indiana (14–3)	USC (18–3)	Providence (23–3)	Alabama (21–4)	Michigan (20–4)	Vanderbilt (23–5)	North Carolina (22–6)	12.
13.	Kansas	Kansas State (1–0)	Alabama (2–0)	Kansas State (5–1)	Alabama (4–1)	Louisville (7–2)	Indiana (7–3)	USC (12–2)	South Carolina (10–3)	Pittsburgh (14–1)	South Carolina (13–3)	USC (16–3)	Long Beach State (20–2)	Long Beach State (21–2)	Indiana (19–4)	Pittsburgh (24–3)	Alabama (22–4)	Vanderbilt (23–5)	13.
14.	Houston	Houston (0–1)	Arizona (3–1)	Arizona (5–1)	USC (6–1)	Providence (8–2)	Wisconsin (8–1)	Michigan (10–2)	Louisville (10–3)	South Carolina (12–3)	USC (14–3)	South Carolina (16–3)	South Carolina (16–4)	South Carolina (19–4)	Pittsburgh (23–3)	Kansas (21–5)	USC (23–4)	Alabama (22–4)	14.
15.	Arizona	Arizona (1–1)	Kansas State (3–1)	South Carolina (4–0)	Syracuse (5–0)	Arizona (8–2)	South Carolina (7–2)	New Mexico (12–2)	Michigan (11–2)	Louisville (11–3)	Louisville (14–3)	Michigan (15–3)	Creighton (19–4)	Kansas (17–5)	Kansas (19–5)	USC (22–4)	Pittsburgh (25–4)	Utah (22–8)	15.
16.	Penn	Penn (1–0)	South Carolina (3–0)	USC (4–1)	Memphis State (7–2)	UNLV (9–1)	UNLV (9–1)	Louisville (9–3)	Pittsburgh (13–1)	Wisconsin (11–2)	Michigan (14–3)	Kansas (15–4)	Kansas (16–5)	Creighton (21–5)	Michigan (19–4)	Louisville (21–5)	Dayton (20–9)	Pittsburgh (25–4)	16.
17.	Jacksonville	Jacksonville (1–1)	San Francisco (1–2)	Vanderbilt (6–0)	New Mexico (8–0)	Wisconsin (7–1)	USC (9–2)	Pittsburgh (12–1)	Wisconsin (10–2)	New Mexico (14–3)	Kansas (13–4)	Creighton (18–4)	Utah (17–5)	Michigan (17–4)	New Mexico (20–6)	New Mexico (21–6)	South Carolina (22–5)	USC (24–5)	17.
18.	Alabama	Alabama (1–0)	Syracuse (3–0)	Syracuse (4–0)	Kansas State (5–2)	Memphis State (8–3)	Michigan (9–2)	Missouri (10–3)	Centenary (12–0)	Kansas (12–3)	UTEP (15–3)	Louisville (14–4)	Kansas State (17–5)	Arizona (19–6)	Louisville (19–5)	South Carolina (22–5)	Oral Roberts (23–5)	Oral Roberts (23–5)	18.
19.	UNLV	UNLV (0–1)	Jacksonville (3–1)	Jacksonville (4–1)	UNLV (7–1)	Syracuse (7–1)	Memphis State (10–3)	Wisconsin (9–2)	New Mexico (12–3)	Oral Roberts (16–2)	Oral Roberts (16–3)	Utah (16–5)	Michigan (16–4)	New Mexico (19–6)	Creighton (21–5)	Creighton (22–6)	Purdue (18–9)	South Carolina (22–5)	19.
20.	Memphis State	Memphis State (2–0)	USC (2–1)	Cincinnati (5–0)	Austin Peay (5–1)	Austin Peay (5–1)	Hawaii (11–0)	Cincinnati (10–3)	Arizona State (11–4)	Michigan (12–3)	Maryland Eastern Shore (19–0)	Arizona (16–5)	Louisville (15–5)	Louisville (17–5)	Oral Roberts (21–4)	Dayton (20–7)	New Mexico (22–7)	Dayton (20–9)	20.
	Preseason	Week 1 Dec. 3	Week 2 Dec. 10	Week 3 Dec. 17	Week 4 Dec. 24	Week 5 Dec. 31	Week 6 Jan. 7	Week 7 Jan. 14	Week 8 Jan. 21	Week 9 Jan. 28	Week 10 Feb. 4	Week 11 Feb. 11	Week 12 Feb. 18	Week 13 Feb. 25	Week 14 Mar. 4	Week 15 Mar. 11	Week 16 Mar. 18	Final Mar. 26	
		Dropped: Kansas	Dropped: Kentucky; Houston; UNLV	Dropped: Penn; San Francisco	Dropped: South Carolina; Jacksonville; Cincinnati	Dropped: Kansas State	Dropped: Arizona; Syracuse; Austin Peay	Dropped: UNLV; Memphis State; Hawaii	Dropped: Missouri; Cincinnati	Dropped: Centenary; Arizona State	Dropped: Wisconsin; New Mexico	Dropped: UTEP; Oral Roberts; Maryland Eastern Shore	Dropped: Arizona	Dropped: Utah; Kansas State	Dropped: Arizona	Dropped: Oral Roberts	Dropped: Louisville; Creighton	Dropped: New Mexico	

== UPI Poll ==
	Week 2 Dec. 11	Week 3 Dec. 18	Week 4 Dec. 25	Week 5 Jan. 2	Week 6 Jan. 8	Week 7 Jan. 15	Week 8 Jan. 22	Week 9 Jan. 29	Week 10 Feb. 5	Week 11 Feb. 12	Week 12 Feb. 19	Week 13 Feb. 26	Week 14 Mar. 5	Final Mar. 12	
1.	UCLA (3–0)	UCLA (4–0)	UCLA (6–0)	UCLA (8–0)	UCLA (9–0)	UCLA (11–0)	Notre Dame (10–0)	UCLA (15–1)	UCLA (16–1)	UCLA (18–1)	NC State (20–1)	NC State (22–1)	NC State (24–1)	NC State (26–1)	1.
2.	NC State (2–0)	North Carolina (5–0)	Notre Dame (6–0)	Notre Dame (7–0)	Notre Dame (7–0)	Notre Dame (8–0)	UCLA (13–1)	NC State (13–1)	NC State (15–1)	NC State (17–1)	Notre Dame (20–1)	Notre Dame (22–1)	Notre Dame (24–1)	UCLA (23–3)	2.
3.	Indiana (3–0)	Notre Dame (5–0)	North Carolina (6–0)	Maryland (5–1)	Maryland (7–1)	NC State (9–1)	NC State (11–1)	Notre Dame (12–1)	Notre Dame (15–1)	Notre Dame (18–1)	UCLA (18–3)	UCLA (20–3)	UCLA (22–3)	Notre Dame (25–2)	3.
4.	North Carolina (2–0)	Marquette (5–0)	Maryland (4–1)	North Carolina (7–0)	NC State (7–1)	Maryland (8–2)	Maryland (10–2)	North Carolina (14–2)	North Carolina (15–2)	North Carolina (17–2)	North Carolina (18–3)	North Carolina (20–3)	North Carolina (21–4)	Maryland (23–5)	4.
5.	Maryland (1–1)	Maryland (2–1)	NC State (3–1)	NC State (6–1)	North Carolina (7–1)	North Carolina (9–1)	North Carolina (12–1)	Marquette (16–1)	Marquette (17–2)	Vanderbilt (18–1)	Vanderbilt (20–1)	Maryland (19–4)	Maryland (21–4)	Marquette (23–4)	5.
6.	Marquette (4–0)	NC State (2–1)	Marquette (7–0)	Marquette (9–0)	Marquette (10–1)	Marquette (12–1)	Marquette (14–1)	Maryland (11–3)	Vanderbilt (16–1)	Maryland (15–4)	Maryland (17–4)	Indiana (18–3)	Vanderbilt (23–2)	Providence (27–3)	6.
7.	Notre Dame (4–0)	Indiana (4–1)	Indiana (5–1)	USC (9–1)	New Mexico (12–0)	Providence (11–2)	Providence (13–2)	Vanderbilt (14–1)	Maryland (13–4)	Maryland (18–3)	Marquette (19–3)	Marquette (21–3)	USC (22–3)	Vanderbilt (23–3)	7.
8.	Providence (1–0)	Providence (3–1)	Providence (6–1)	Indiana (7–2)	Vanderbilt (9–0)	Vanderbilt (10–1)	Vanderbilt (12–1)	Providence (15–2)	Alabama (15–2)	Pittsburgh (19–1)	Pittsburgh (21–1)	Vanderbilt (21–2)	Providence (25–3)	North Carolina (22–5)	8.
9.	Memphis State (4–0)	Louisville (4–1)	Louisville (6–1)	New Mexico (10–0)	Long Beach State (10–1) т	Indiana (9–3)	Long Beach State (12–1)	Alabama (13–2)	Pittsburgh (17–1)	Indiana (14–3)	USC (18–3)	USC (20–3)	Marquette (22–4)	Indiana (20–4)	9.
10.	Louisville (3–1)	USC (4–1)	USC (6–1)	Alabama (6–1)	Louisville (8–2) т	Long Beach State (12–1)	Alabama (10–2)	Pittsburgh (14–1)	USC (14–3)	Long Beach State (18–2)	Indiana (16–3)	Alabama (20–3)	Indiana (19–4)	Kansas (21–5)	10.
11.	Alabama (2–0)	Alabama (3–0) т	Vanderbilt (7–0)	Long Beach State (9–1)	Providence (9–2)	Alabama (9–2)	USC (12–2)	USC (14–2)	Indiana (13–3)	Alabama (16–3)	Alabama (18–3)	Pittsburgh (22–2)	South Carolina (21–4)	Long Beach State (23–2)	11.
12.	Long Beach State (2–1)	Kansas State (5–1) т	Long Beach State (7–1)	Vanderbilt (8–0)	Alabama (6–2) т	New Mexico (12–2)	Pittsburgh (13–1)	Long Beach State (14–2)	Providence (16–3)	Providence (18–3)	Providence (21–3)	Long Beach State (21–2)	Long Beach State (23–2)	Michigan (20–4)	12.
13.	South Carolina (3–0)	Long Beach State (5–1)	New Mexico (8–0)	Providence (8–2)	Indiana (7–3) т	South Carolina (9–2)	Indiana (11–3)	Indiana (12–3) т	Louisville (14–3)	USC (16–3)	Long Beach State (20–2)	Providence (23–3)	Kansas (19–5)	USC (22–4)	13.
14.	Kansas State (3–1)	South Carolina (4–0)	Oklahoma (5–1)	Louisville (7–2)	South Carolina (7–2)	USC (12–2)	South Carolina (10–3)	Louisville (11–3) т	Long Beach State (16–2)	Kansas (15–4)	Kansas (16–5)	Kansas (17–5)	New Mexico (20–6)	Pittsburgh (24–3)	14.
15.	Cincinnati (3–0)	Cincinnati (5–0) т	Arizona (5–1)	Missouri (6–2)	Wisconsin (8–1)	Louisville (9–3)	Louisville (10–3)	South Carolina (12–3)	UTEP (15–3)	Michigan (15–3)	Kansas State (17–5)	Kansas State (18–5)	Louisville (19–5)	Louisville (21–5)	15.
16.	New Mexico (4–0)	New Mexico (7–0) т	UNLV (7–1)	Wisconsin (7–1)	USC (9–2)	Missouri (10–3)	Wisconsin (10–2)	Kansas (12–3)	Kansas (13–4)	South Carolina (16–3)	South Carolina (16–4) т	South Carolina (19–4) т	Alabama (21–4)	South Carolina (22–5)	16.
17.	Penn (3–0) т	Vanderbilt (6–0)	Alabama (4–1)	South Carolina (5–2)	Missouri (8–3)	Arizona State (10–4)	Kansas (11–3)	Wisconsin (11–2)	South Carolina (13–3)	Louisville (14–4)	Creighton (19–4) т	Creighton (21–5) т	Pittsburgh (23–3)	Creighton (22–6)	17.
18.	Arizona (3–1) т	Oklahoma (4–1)	Syracuse (5–0)	Arizona (8–2) т	UNLV (9–1)	Michigan (10–2) т	Arizona State (11–4)	UTEP (14–3)	Creighton (16–4) т	Creighton (18–4)	Utah (17–5)	New Mexico (19–6)	Creighton (21–5)	New Mexico (21–6)	18.
19.	USC (2–1) т	Memphis State (6–1) т	Memphis State (7–2)	UNLV (9–1) т	Memphis State (10–3)	Wisconsin (9–2) т	UTEP (12–2)	Purdue (12–5) т	Penn (15–4) т	Utah (16–5)	New Mexico (17–5)	UTEP (18–6)	Michigan (19–4)	Alabama (22–4) т	19.
20.	Vanderbilt (4–0) т	Arizona (5–1) т	South Carolina (4–1)	Purdue (7–3) т	Dayton (8–2)	Syracuse (8–3)	Michigan (11–2)	Syracuse (12–3) т	Syracuse (13–4) т	Purdue (14–6)	Louisville (15–5)	Louisville (17–5)	Syracuse (19–6)	Dayton (20–7) т	20.
	Week 2 Dec. 11	Week 3 Dec. 18	Week 4 Dec. 25	Week 5 Jan. 2	Week 6 Jan. 8	Week 7 Jan. 15	Week 8 Jan. 22	Week 9 Jan. 29	Week 10 Feb. 5	Week 11 Feb. 12	Week 12 Feb. 19	Week 13 Feb. 26	Week 14 Mar. 5	Final Mar. 12	
		Dropped: Penn	Dropped: Kansas State (5–2); Cincinnati	Dropped: Oklahoma; Syracuse (7–1); Memphis State (8–3)	Dropped: Arizona; Purdue	Dropped: UNLV; Memphis State; Dayton	Dropped: New Mexico (12–3); Missouri; Syracuse	Dropped: Arizona State; Michigan (12–3)	Dropped: Wisconsin; Purdue	Dropped: UTEP; Penn; Syracuse	Dropped: Michigan (16–4); Purdue	Dropped: Utah	Dropped: Kansas State; UTEP	Dropped: Syracuse	
