= 1973–74 St. John's Redmen basketball team =

American college basketball season

1973–74 St. John's Redmen men's basketball

Connecticut Classic Champions ECAC Holiday Festival, Second Place

1974 NIT, First Round
- Conference: Independent
- Record: 20–7
- Head coach: Lou Carnesecca
- Assistant coaches: John Kresse; Brian Mahoney
- Captain: Ed Searcy
- Home arena: Alumni Hall; Madison Square Garden

The 1973–74 St. John's Redmen basketball team represented St. John's University during the 1973–74 NCAA Division I men's basketball season. The team was coached by Lou Carnesecca in his sixth year at the school and his first since returning from coaching the New York Nets in the ABA. St. John's home games are played at Alumni Hall and Madison Square Garden.

The Redmen lost to UConn in the first round of the 1974 National Invitation Tournament.

== Roster ==
1973–74 St. John's Red Storm men's basketball team
Players
Coaches

Pos.	#	Name	Height	Weight	Year	Previous school	Hometown
G	-	Terry McCormack	6 ft 6 in (1.98 m)	—	RS Jr	St. Francis Prep/Hofstra	New Hyde Park, NY
F	-	Dennis McIntyre	6 ft 3 in (1.91 m)	—	RS Sr	Monsignor McClancy/Nassau	Bayside, NY
G	10	Frank Alagia	5 ft 9 in (1.75 m)	—	So	St. Agnes (NY)	Rockville Centre, NY
G	12	Kevin Raftery	6 ft 2 in (1.88 m)	—	Sr	Archbishop Molloy	Briarwood, NJ
G/F	22	Beaver Smith	6 ft 4 in (1.93 m)	—	So	South Side	Rockille Centre, NY
G	30	Mel Utley	6 ft 3 in (1.91 m)	—	Jr	Far Rockaway	Far Rockaway, NY
G/F	32	Glen Williams	6 ft 4 in (1.93 m)	—	Fr	Laurinburg Prep	St. Thomas, USVI
F/C	34	Ed Searcy (C)	6 ft 6 in (1.98 m)	—	RS Sr	Power Memorial/Duquesne	New York, NY
G	35	Kevin Cluess	6 ft 4 in (1.93 m)	—	Jr	Archbishop Molloy	West Hempstead, NY
F	42	John Farmer (redshirt)	6 ft 5 in (1.96 m)	—	Jr	St. John the Baptist/Hofstra	Brentwood, NY
C	52	Tom Weadock (redshirt)	6 ft 11 in (2.11 m)	—	So	Power Memorial/San Jacinto	New York, NY

Head coach

- Lou Carnesecca (St. John's, '50)

Assistant coach(es)

- John Kresse (St. John's, '64)
- Brian Mahoney (Manhattan, '71)

Legend

- (C) Team captain
- (S) Suspended
- (I) Ineligible
- (W) Walk-on
- Injured
- Current redshirt

== Schedule and results ==
Date time, TV	Rank^{#}	Opponent^{#}	Result	Record	Site city, state
Regular Season
11/30/73*		vs. No. 17 Jacksonville; IPTAY Tournament Semifinal	W 69–64	1–0	Littlejohn Coliseum; Clemson, SC
12/01/73*		at Clemson; IPTAY Tournament Championship	L 58–68	1–1	Littlejohn Coliseum; Clemson, SC
12/08/73*		at Georgetown	L 82–85 ^{OT}	1–2	McDonough Gymnasium; Washington, D.C.
12/11/73*		Davidson	W 94–78	2–2	Alumni Hall; Queens, NY
12/15/73*		American	W 92–61	3–2	Alumni Hall; Queens, NY
12/21/73*		vs. No. 10 Alabama; Connecticut Classic Semifinal	W 72–67	4–2	Hartford Civic Center; Hartford, CT
12/22/73*		vs. No. 19 Jacksonville; Connecticut Classic Final	W 68–60	5–2	Hartford Civic Center; Hartford, CT
12/26/73*		vs. Illinois; ECAC Holiday Festival Quarterfinal	W 76–60	6–2	Madison Square Garden; New York, NY
12/27/73*		vs. Princeton; ECAC Holiday Festival Semifinal	W 64–51	7–2	Madison Square Garden; New York, NY
12/29/73*		vs. Manhattan; ECAC Holiday Festival Championship	L 65–74	7–3	Madison Square Garden; New York, NY
01/05/74*		at Dayton	L 58–84	7–4	University of Dayton Arena; Dayton, OH
01/08/74*		Hofstra	W 89–68	8–4	Alumni Hall; Queens, NY
01/12/74*		Syracuse	L 71–72	8–5	Alumni Hall; Queens, NY
01/19/74*		Villanova	W 92–71	9–5	Alumni Hall; Queens, NY
01/23/74*		Temple	W 64–49	10–5	The Palestra; Philadelphia, PA
01/26/74*		at Dartmouth	W 76–62	11–5	Alumni Gymnasium; Hanover, NH
01/31/74*		at Rhode Island	W 77–59	12–5	Keaney Gymnasium; Kingston, RI
02/02/74*		Army	W 74–50	13–5	Alumni Hall; Queens, NY
02/09/74*		Fordham	W 65–59	14–5	Madison Square Garden; New York, NY
02/13/74*		St. Joseph's	W 61–59 ^{OT}	15–5	Alumni Hall; Queens, NY
02/16/74*		at Niagara	W 94–75	16–5	NU Student Center; Niagara Falls, NY
02/19/74*		at Boston College	W 80–72	17–5	Roberts Center; Chestnut Hill, MA
02/23/74*		Seton Hall	W 68–53	18–5	Alumni Hall; Queens, NY
02/26/74*		Holy Cross	W 98–72	19–5	Alumni Hall; Queens, NY
03/02/74*		at No. 12 Providence	L 67–85	19–6	Providence Civic Center; Providence, RI
03/05/74*		St. Francis (NY)	W 82–66	20–6	Alumni Hall; Queens, NY
NIT Tournament
03/17/74*		vs. Connecticut; NIT First Round	L 70–84	20–7	Madison Square Garden; New York, NY
*Non-conference game. ^{#}Rankings from AP Poll. (#) Tournament seedings in parentheses.

== Team players drafted into the NBA ==
Round	Pick	Player	NBA club
5	82	Ed Searcy	New Orleans Jazz
