= 1974 in Michigan =

- Decades: 1950s; 1960s; 1970s; 1980s; 1990s
- See also: History of Michigan; Historical outline of Michigan; List of years in Michigan; 1974 in the United States

Events from the year 1974 in Michigan.

The Associated Press (AP) selected the top news stories of 1974 in Michigan as follows:

1. Gerald Ford's elevation to President of the United States after the resignation of Richard Nixon;
2. The decline of the automobile industry tied to the 1973 oil crisis with layoffs of more than 200,000 automobile workers;
3. The re-election of William Milliken as Governor of Michigan despite a general tide in favor of Democrats;
4. The United States Supreme Court ruling in Milliken v. Bradley reversing a lower court order requiring cross-district busing of public school students among 53 school districts in metropolitan Detroit and instead directing the creation of a desegregation plan limited to the Detroit schools;
5. Voters' repeal of the state sales tax on food and drugs;
6. Gasoline shortage;
7. Contaminated feed forces the slaughter of thousands of farm animals;
8. Democrats take the Fifth and Eighth Congressional Districts and then hold them in post-Watergate elections resulting in Democrats taking control of the Michigan Legislature and the state's Congressional delegation;
9. The worst snowstorm of the century hit southern Michigan; and
10. Utilities suffered lower profit margins and were granted large rate increases.

The AP also selected the state's top sports stories of 1974 as follows:

1. Al Kaline's retiring after 21 years with 3,007 hits and 399 home runs;
2. The 1974 Michigan Wolverines football team compiling a 10–0 record before losing to Ohio State on November 23;
3. The death of Detroit Lions head coach Don McCafferty on July 28;
4. The 1974 Michigan State Spartans football team compiling a 7–3–1 record and upsetting No. 1 ranked Ohio State on November 9;
5. The 1974 Central Michigan Chippewas football team winning the NCAA Division II Football Championship;
6. The 1973–74 Detroit Pistons compiling a 52–30 record, the best in franchise history to that point;
7. The rise and fall of the Detroit Wheels of the World Football League;
8. The 1974 Detroit Lions compiling a 7–7 record under new head coach Rick Forzano;
9. Hudson High School won the Class C state football championship and kept its winning streak alive; and
10. John Hiller of the Detroit Tigers set an American League record with 17 wins as a relief pitcher and was named to the All-Star team.

The year's highlights in Michigan music included the releases of Stevie Wonder's Fulfillingness' First Finale which reached #1 and won the Grammy for Album of the Year, Grand Funk Railroad's Shinin' On album with the #1 hit The Loco-Motion, and Aretha Franklin's Let Me in Your Life album that reached #1 on Billboard's R&B albums chart.

== Office holders ==
=== State office holders ===
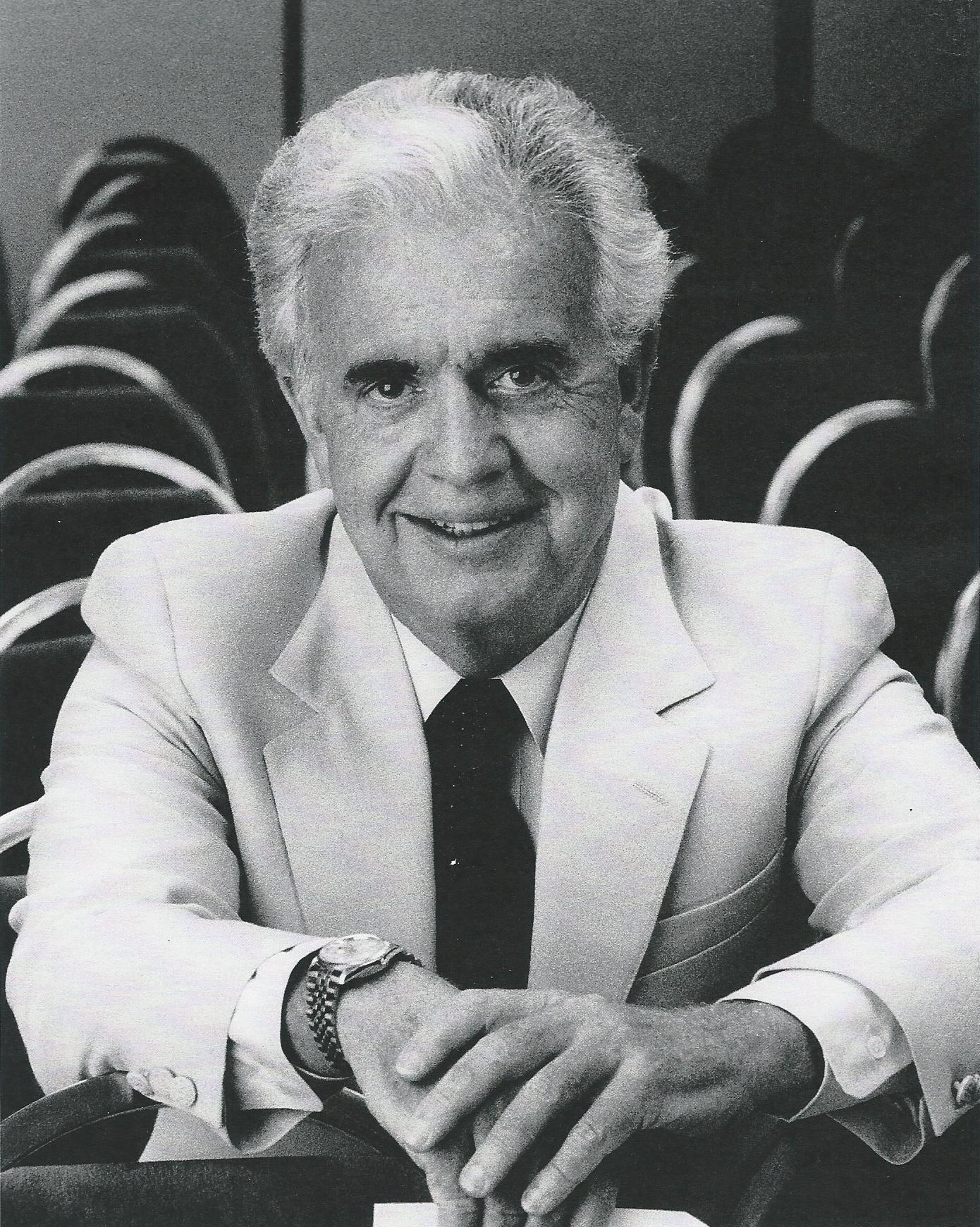
Frank J. Kelley

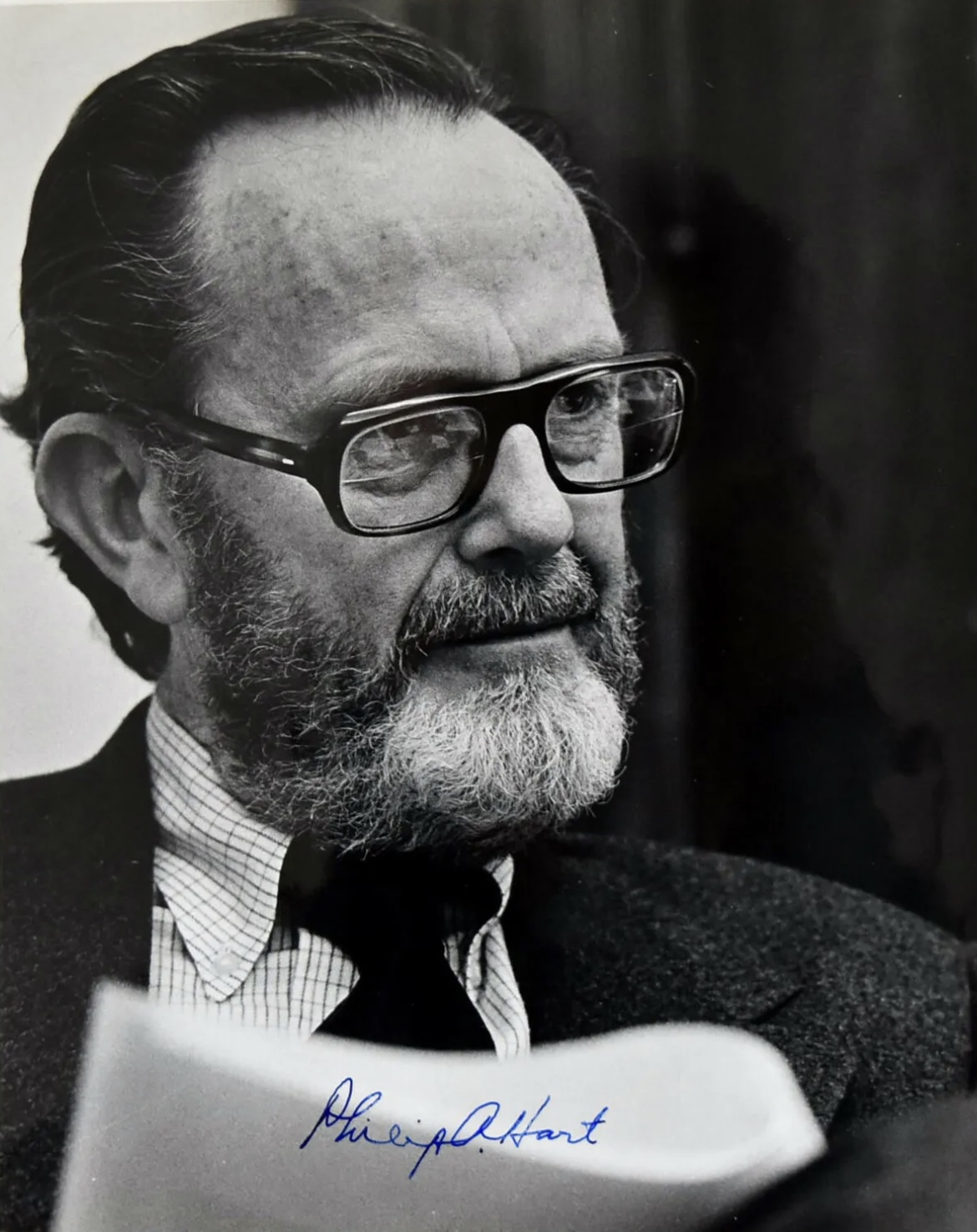
Philip Hart

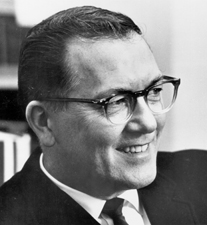
Robert P. Griffin

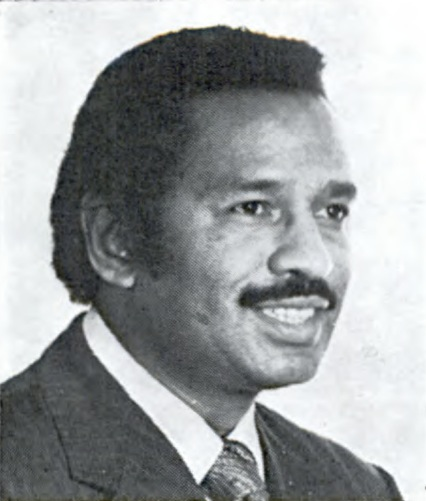
John Conyers

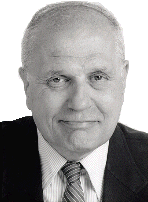
John Dingell

- Governor of Michigan: William Milliken (Republican)
- Lieutenant Governor of Michigan: James Damman (Republican)
- Michigan Attorney General: Frank J. Kelley (Democrat)
- Michigan Secretary of State: Richard H. Austin (Democrat)
- Speaker of the Michigan House of Representatives: William A. Ryan (Democrat)
- Majority Leader of the Michigan Senate: Robert VanderLaan (Republican)/Milton Zaagman (Republican)
- Chief Justice, Michigan Supreme Court: Thomas M. Kavanagh

=== Mayors of major cities ===
- Mayor of Detroit: Coleman Young
- Mayor of Grand Rapids: Lyman Parks
- Mayor of Warren, Michigan: Ted Bates
- Mayor of Sterling Heights, Michigan: Anthony Dobry
- Mayor of Flint: Paul Calvin Visser
- Mayor of Dearborn: Orville L. Hubbard
- Mayor of Lansing: Gerald W. Graves
- Mayor of Ann Arbor: James E. Stephenson (Republican)
- Mayor of Saginaw: William F. Nelson, Jr.

=== Federal office holders ===
- United States Senator from Michigan: Philip Hart (Democrat)
- United States Senator from Michigan: Robert P. Griffin (Republican)
- United States Representative, District 1: John Conyers (Democrat)
- United States Representative, District 2: Marvin L. Esch (Republican)
- United States Representative, District 3: Garry E. Brown (Republican)
- United States Representative, District 4: J. Edward Hutchinson (Republican)
- United States Representative, District 5: Richard Vander Veen (Democrat)
- United States Representative, District 6: Charles E. Chamberlain (Republican)
- United States Representative, District 7: Donald W. Riegle Jr. (Republican)
- United States Representative, District 8: R. James Harvey (Republican)/J. Bob Traxler (Democrat)
- United States Representative, District 9: Guy Vander Jagt (Republican)
- United States Representative, District 10: Elford Albin Cederberg (Republican)
- United States Representative, District 11: Philip Ruppe (Republican)
- United States Representative, District 12: James G. O'Hara (Democrat)
- United States Representative, District 13: Charles Diggs (Democrat)
- United States Representative, District 14: Lucien N. Nedzi (Democrat)
- United States Representative, District 15: William D. Ford (Democrat)
- United States Representative, District 16: John Dingell (Democrat)
- United States Representative, District 17: Martha Griffiths (Democrat)
- United States Representative, District 18: Robert J. Huber (Republican)
- United States Representative, District 19: William Broomfield (Republican)

== Population ==
In the 1970 United States census, Michigan was recorded as having a population of 8,875,083 persons, ranking as the seventh most populous state in the country. By 1980, the state's population had grown 4.4% to 9,262,078 persons.

=== Cities ===
The following is a list of cities in Michigan with a population of at least 70,000 based on 1970 U.S. Census data. Historic census data from 1960 and 1980 is included to reflect trends in population increases or decreases. Cities that are part of the Detroit metropolitan area are shaded in tan.

1970 Rank	City	County	1960 Pop.	1970 Pop.	1980 Pop.	Change 1970-80
1	Detroit	Wayne	1,670,144	1,514,063	1,203,368	−20.5% ▼
2	Grand Rapids	Kent	177,313	197,649	181,843	−8.0% ▼
3	Flint	Genesee	196,940	193,317	159,611	−17.4% ▼
4	Warren	Macomb	89,246	179,260	161,134	−10.1% ▼
5	Lansing	Ingham	107,807	131,403	130,414	−0.8% ▼
6	Livonia	Wayne	66,702	110,109	104,814	−4.8% ▼
7	Dearborn	Wayne	112,007	104,199	90,660	−13.0% ▼
8	Ann Arbor	Washtenaw	67,340	100,035	107,969	7.9% ▲
9	Saginaw	Saginaw	98,265	91,849	77,508	−15.6% ▼
10	St. Clair Shores	Macomb	76,657	88,093	76,210	−13.5% ▼
11	Westland	Wayne	60,743	86,749	84,603	−2.5% ▼
12	Royal Oak	Oakland	80,612	86,238	70,893	−17.8% ▼
13	Kalamazoo	Kalamazoo	82,089	85,555	79,722	−6.8% ▼
14	Pontiac	Oakland	82,233	85,279	76,715	−10.0% ▼
15	Dearborn Heights	Wayne	61,118	80,069	67,706	−15.4% ▼
16	Taylor	Wayne	na	70,020	77,568	10.8% ▲

=== Counties ===
The following is a list of counties in Michigan with populations of at least 120,000 based on 1970 U.S. Census data. Historic census data from 1960 and 1980 are included to reflect trends in population increases or decreases. Counties that are part of the Detroit metropolitan area are shaded in tan.

1970 Rank	County	Largest city	1960 Pop.	1970 Pop.	1980 Pop.	Change 1970-80
1	Wayne	Detroit	2,666,297	2,666,751	2,337,891	−12.3% ▼
2	Oakland	Pontiac	690,259	907,871	1,011,793	11.4% ▲
3	Macomb	Warren	405,804	625,309	694,600	11.1% ▲
4	Genesee	Flint	374,313	444,341	450,449	1.4% ▲
5	Kent	Grand Rapids	363,187	411,044	444,506	8.1% ▲
6	Ingham	Lansing	211,296	261,039	275,520	5.5% ▲
7	Washtenaw	Ann Arbor	172,440	234,103	264,748	13.1% ▲
8	Saginaw	Saginaw	190,752	219,743	228,059	3.8% ▲
9	Kalamazoo	Kalamazoo	169,712	201,550	212,378	5.4% ▲
10	Berrien	Benton Harbor	149,865	163,875	171,276	4.5% ▲
11	Muskegon	Muskegon	129,943	157,426	157,589	0.1% ▲
12	Jackson	Jackson	131,994	143,274	151,495	5.7% ▲
13	Calhoun	Battle Creek	138,858	141,963	141,557	−0.3% ▼
14	Ottawa	Holland	98,719	128,181	157,174	22.6% ▲
15	St. Clair	Port Huron	107,201	120,175	138,802	15.5% ▲
16	Monroe	Monroe	101,120	118,479	134,659	13.7% ▲
17	Bay	Bay City	107,042	117,339	119,881	2.2% ▲

== Sports ==
=== Baseball ===
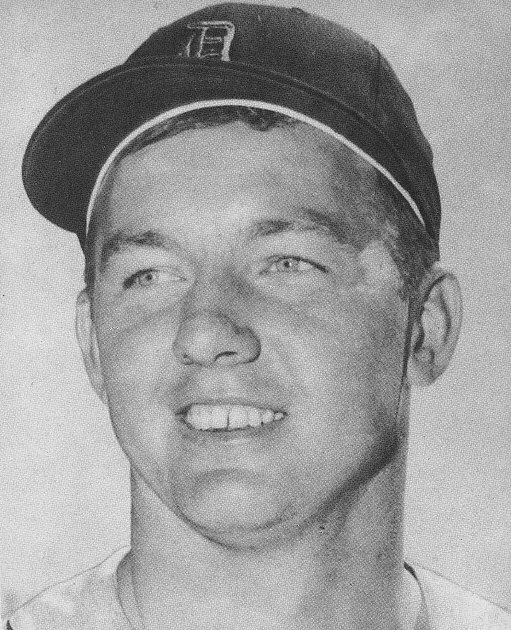
Al Kaline

- 1974 Detroit Tigers season – compiled a 72–90 record and finished in last place in the American League East; in his final season, Al Kaline became the 12th player to join the 3,000 hit club
- 1974 Michigan Wolverines baseball team - Under head coach Moby Benedict, the Wolverines compiled an 18–14–1 record. John Lonchar was the team captain.

=== American football ===
- 1974 Detroit Lions season – compiled a 7–7 record and finished in second place in the NFC Central in their final season playing in Tiger Stadium; head coach Don McCafferty died before the season began and was replaced by Rick Forzano
- Detroit Wheels – compiled a 1–13 record in the World Football League before ceasing operations and cancelling the final six games
- 1974 Michigan Wolverines football team – compiled a 10–1 record, won the Big Ten co-championship, and was ranked No. 3 in the final AP Poll; cornerback Dave Brown was a consensus All-American
- 1974 Michigan State Spartans football team – compiled a 7–3–1 record and was ranked No. 12 in the final AP Poll
- 1974 Central Michigan Chippewas football team – compiled a 12–1 record and won the NCAA Division II Football Championship
- 1974 Eastern Michigan Hurons football team – compiled a 4–6–1 record
- 1974 Western Michigan Broncos football team – compiled a 3–8 record and finished last in the Mid-American Conference
- 1974 Wayne State Tartars football team – compiled a 7–3 record

=== Basketball ===
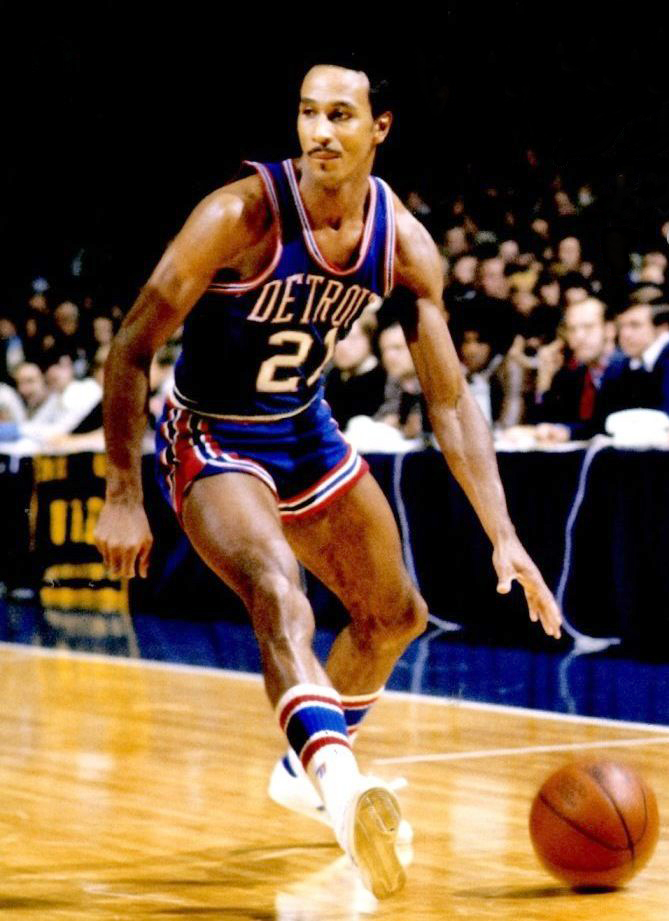
Dave Bing

- 1973–74 Detroit Pistons season – compiled a 52–30 record and finished in third place in the Midwest Division of the NBA's Western Conference; Dave Bing led the team in minutes played and assists
- 1973–74 Michigan Wolverines men's basketball team – compiled a 22–5 record, won the Big Ten co-championship, and advanced to the Elite Eight
- 1973–74 Michigan State Spartans men's basketball team – compiled a 13–11 record and finished in fifth place in the Big Ten

=== Ice hockey ===
- 1973–74 Detroit Red Wings season – compiled a 29–39–10 record and finished in sixth place in the NHL East; Marcel Dionne led the team in points scored
- Great Lakes Invitational - Michigan Tech defeated Michigan, 3–2, in the championship game at Olympia Stadium in Detroit (December 29)

=== Motor sports ===
- Michigan 400 - Richard Petty won the race in front of 51,500 spectators at the Michigan International Speedway (June 16)
- Gar Wood Trophy Race - For the third consecutive year, the Miss Budweiser, piloted by rookie Howie Benns, won the unlimited hydrofoil race on the Detroit River (June 30)

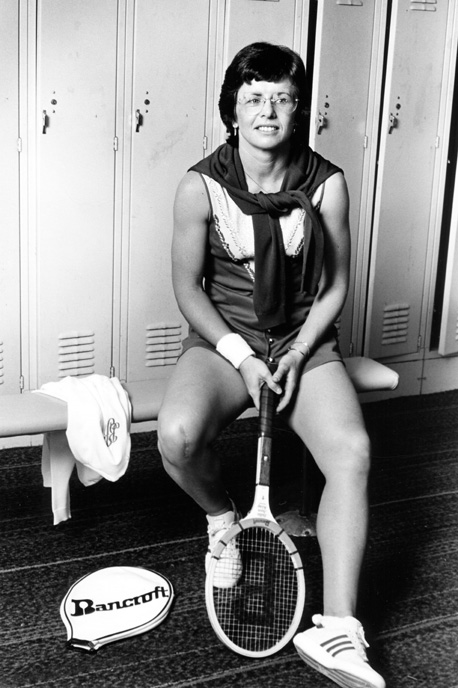
Billie Jean King

- Michigan 200 - Bobby Unser won the race in front of 46,180 spectators at Michigan International Speedway (July 21)

=== Other ===
- 1974 Virginia Slims of Detroit – Billie Jean King defeated Rosemary Casals in the singles; King and Casals defeated Françoise Dürr and Betty Stöve in the doubles (February 24)
- 1974 NCAA Indoor Track and Field Championships – The UTEP Miners won the team championship at Cobo Arena in Detroit (March 8-9)
- Port Huron to Mackinac Boat Race - the "Dora IV", captained by Lynn Williams of Chicago, was the overall winner (July 22)

== Music ==
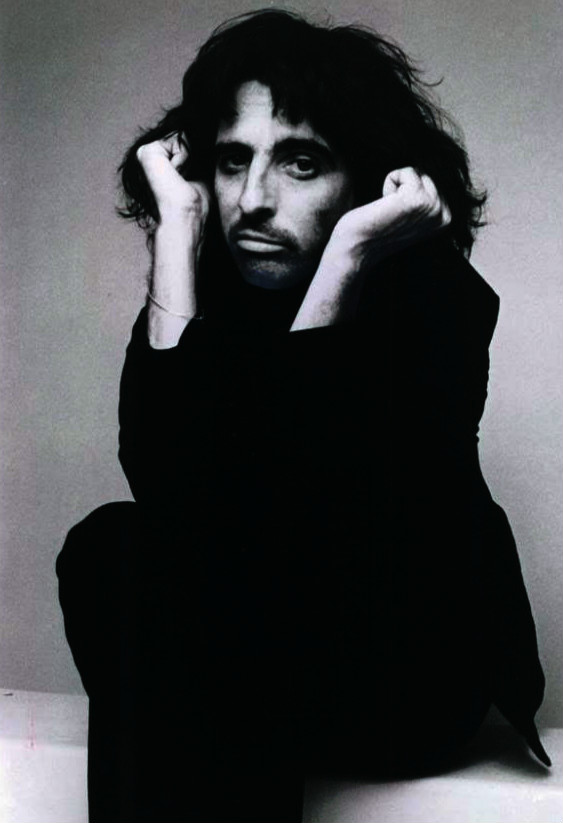
Alice Cooper

- February - Ted Nugent, a Redford native, released his Call of the Wild album
- February - Aretha Franklin, who was raised in Detroit, released her Let Me in Your Life album; it reached #1 on Billboard's R&B albums chart
- March - Bob Seger, a Detroit native, released his album Seven
- March - Grand Funk Railroad, from Flint, released its Shinin' On album; it peaked at #5 in the US and was certified gold, and its first single, a cover of The Loco-Motion was a #1 hit in the US
- March - Smokey Robinson, a Detroit native, released his Pure Smokey album
- March 30 - An Alice Cooper concert in São Paulo draws a crowd estimated at 100,000; days later, he drew a crowd of 120,000 in Rio
- April - The Four Tops, from Detroit, released their Meeting of the Minds album
- May - Diana Ross, a Detroit native, released her Live at Caesars Palace album

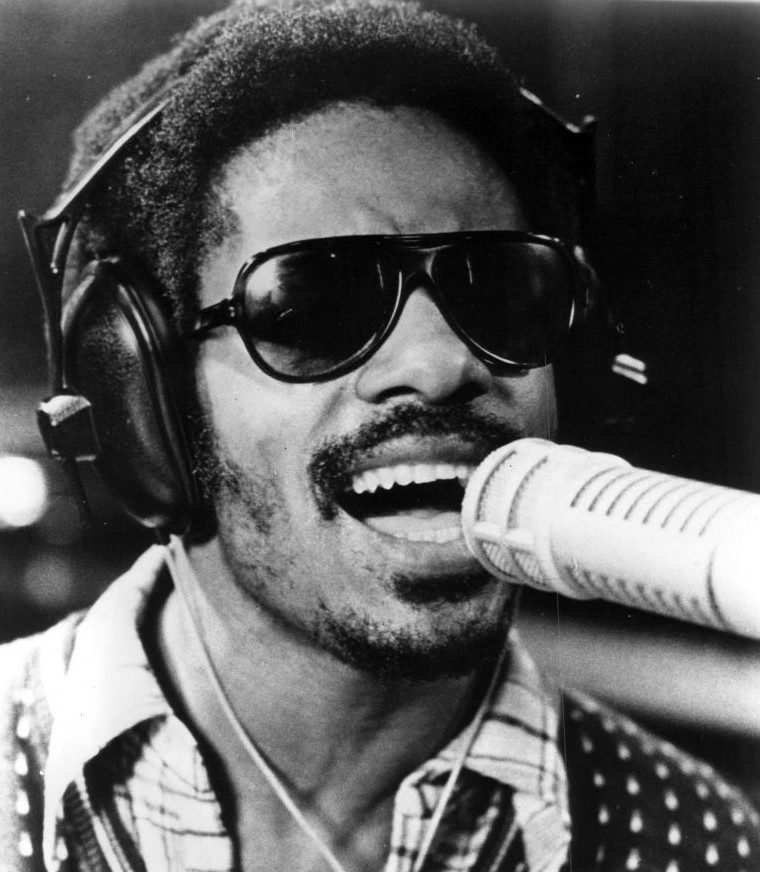
Stevie Wonder

- July - Stevie Wonder, a Saginaw native who was raised in Detroit, released his Fulfillingness' First Finale; the album reached #1 in the US and received the Grammy for Album of the Year; the song You Haven't Done Nothin' also topped the singles chart
- August - Alice Cooper, a Detroit native, released his Greatest Hits album, including a new remix of I'm Eighteen
- September - Ted Nugent released his Tooth Fang & Claw album
- September 27 - Stevie Wonder performed a concert at Olympia Stadium in Detroit; Mayor Young pronounced September 27 Stevie Wonder Day in Detroit and presented Wonder with a key to the city
- September 29 - Elvis Presley performed a concert before a crowd of 17,105 at Olympia Stadium in Detroit
- October 5 - Alice Cooper attended a party in Bloomfield Hills for the premiere of his film, "Good to See You Again, Alice Cooper".
- October 12 - Bachman Turner Overdrive played a sold-out concert at Cobo Arena in Detroit; warm up artist Bob Seger "knocked 'em out with 'Travelin' Man'"
- November 13-15 - Elton John performed three sold-out concerts at Olympia Stadium in Detroit
- December - Grand Funk Railroad released its All the Girls in the World Beware!!!

== Companies ==
The following is a list of major companies based in Michigan in 1974.

Company	1974 Rank	1975 Rank	Headquarters	Core business
General Motors	1	2	Detroit	Automobiles
Ford Motor Company	3	3	Dearborn	Automobiles
Chrysler	4	11	Highland Park	Automobiles
Dow Chemical Company	38	27	Midland	Chemicals
Bendix Corporation	61	76	Southfield	Automotive brakes, vacuum tubes, aeronautical hydraulics and electric power systems, avionics, fuel control systems, radios, televisions and computers
American Motors	88	93	Detroit	Automobiles
Whirlpool Corporation	97	122	Benton Harbor	Home appliances
Clark Equipment Company	149	148	Buchanan	Industrial and construction machinery and equipment
Kellogg Co.	197	200	Battle Creek	Cereal products
Gerber Products Company	461	--	Fremont	Baby food
Burroughs Corporation			Detroit	Business equipment
National Bank of Detroit			Detroit	Banking
Detroit Edison			Detroit	Electric utility
Ex-Cell-O			Troy	Engine components, auto parts, machine tools
Masco			Taylor	Home improvement and construction products
S. S. Kresge Corporation			Troy	Kmart and Kresge retail stores
Monroe Auto Equipment Co.			Monroe	Auto parts
Upjohn			Kalamazoo	Pharmaceutical
Steelcase			Grand Rapids	Office, educational, and health care furniture
Consumers Power			Jackson	Natural gas utility
Michigan National Corp.			Bloomfield Hills	Banking
Amway			Ada	Consumer products, direct selling

== Chronology of events ==
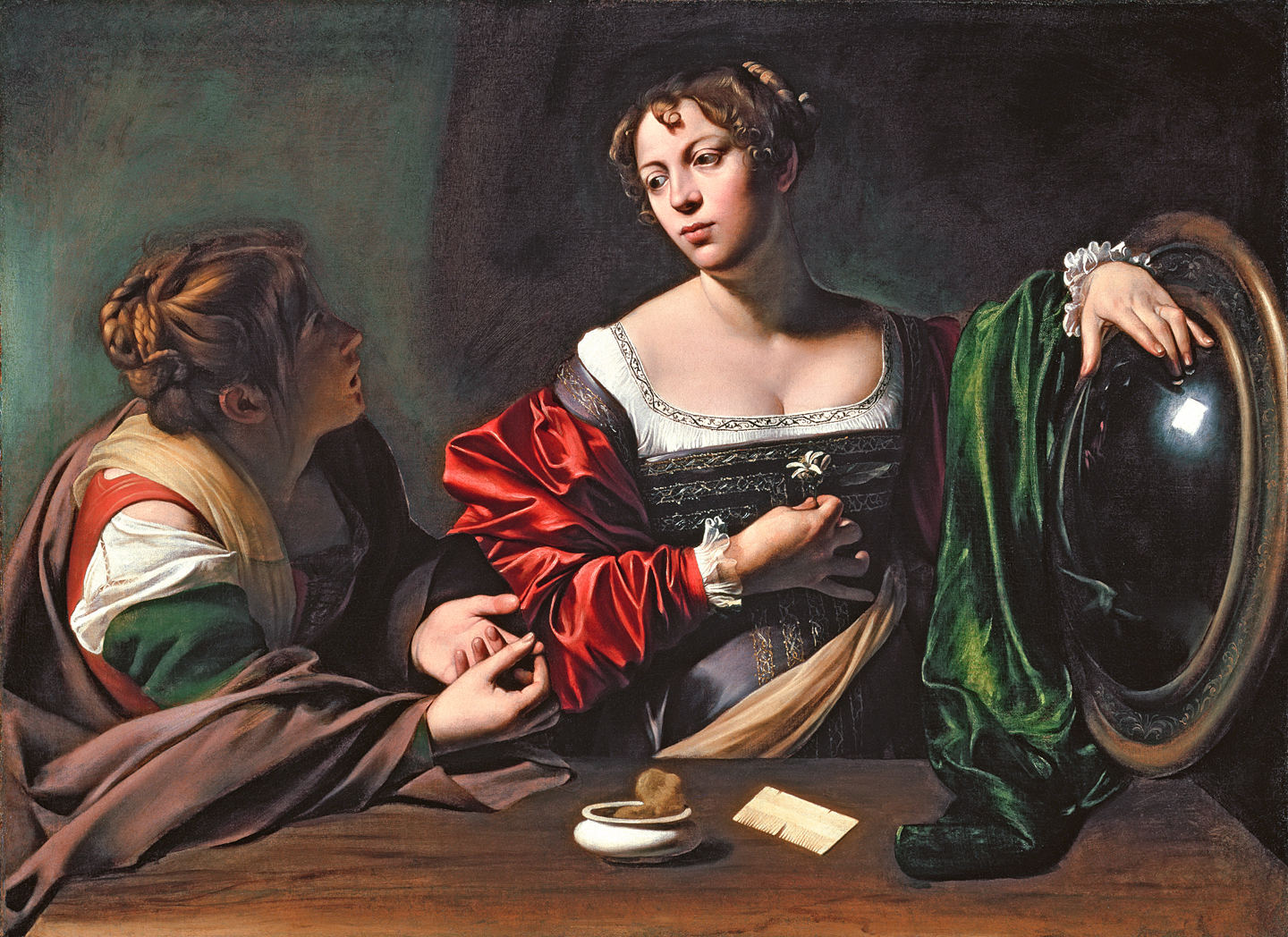
The Conversion of Magdalene

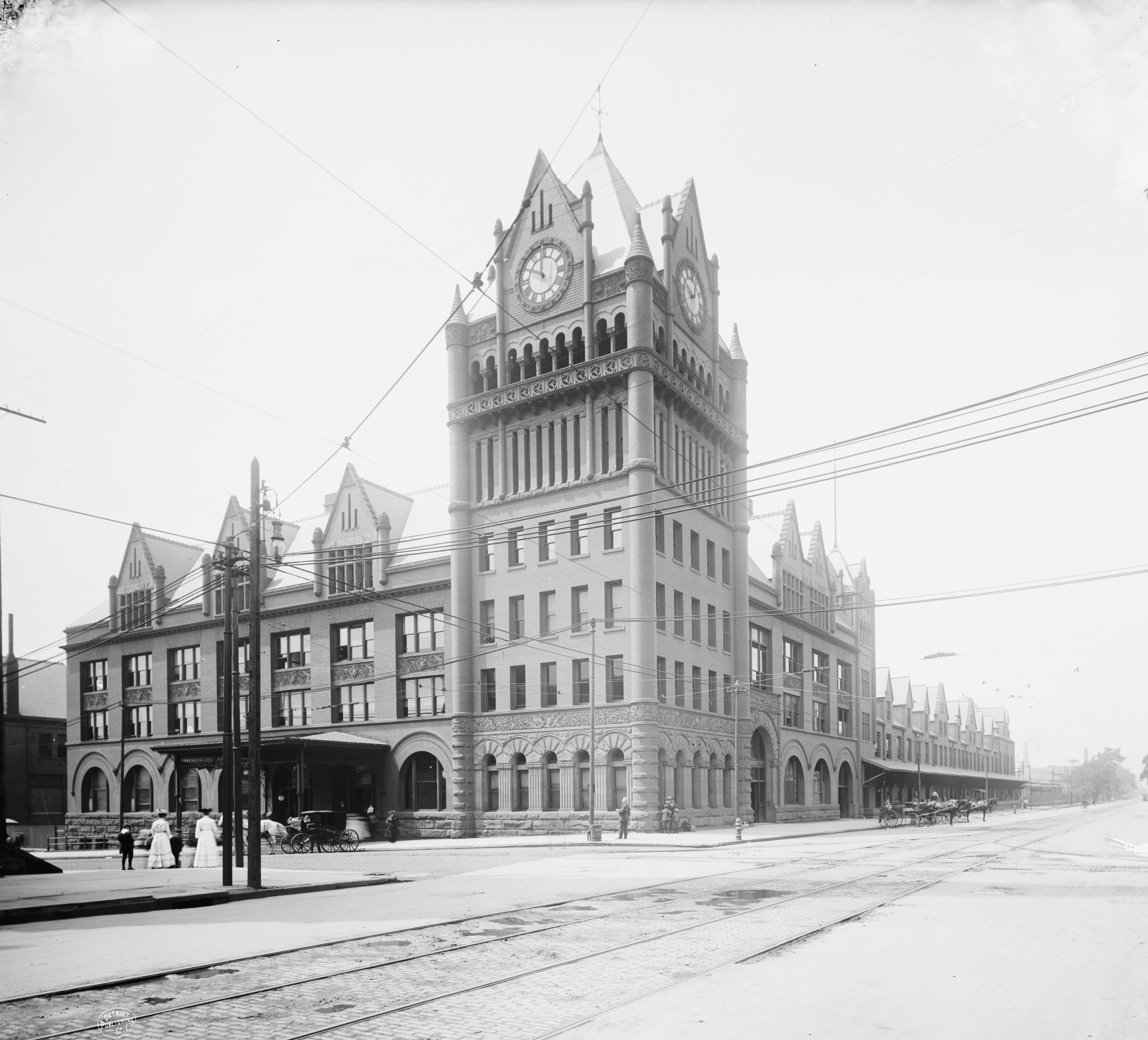
Fort Street Union Depot

=== January ===
- January 1 – Detroit began the new year with five homicides on New Year's Day.
- January 2 – Coleman Young was sworn in as the first black mayor of Detroit and warned criminals to "hit the road".
- January 9 – State Senator Charles N. Youngblood, Jr. resigned his Michigan Senate seat following his conviction for bribe conspiracy.
- January 10 – Gov. William Milliken in his annual State of the State message called for $53 million in tax cuts.
- January 14 – The Detroit Institute of Arts unveiled its recent acquisition, The Conversion of Magdalene by Caravaggio.
- January 15 – The Teamsters began a strike at five supermarket chains representing 80% of the food sales in southeastern Michigan. The strike ended on January 28.
- January 16 – Two Detroit police officers were killed in a shootout with a tool and die worker in northeast Detroit.
- January 24 – General Motors announced plans to lay off 75,000 hourly workers, 50,000 in Michigan, at 14 plants by March.
- January 30 – UAW President Leonard Woodcock called for a temporary curb on foreign automobile imports in the wake of high unemployment in the automobile industry.
- January 28–30 – Fort Street Union Depot in Detroit, built in 1891, was demolished.
- January 31 – General Motors announced record profits of $2.4 billion for 1973.

=== February ===
- February – Michigan's unemployment rate reaches 10.6%, the highest in the country with large layoffs in the automobile industry, including almost 21,000 General Motors workers laid off in Flint alone.
- February 8 - Amid violence against independent truckers continuing to drive despite a truckers strike, Gov. Milliken ordered the Michigan National Guard placed on alert and doubled patrols by the Michigan State Police.
- February 9 - A foreman at Chrysler's Huber Avenue Foundry in Detroit died from multiple head injuries after being beaten by an auto worker in the plant's finishing room.
- February 13 – Detroit Mayor Coleman Young announced the abolition of the Detroit Police Department's controversial STRESS (Stop the Robberies and Enjoy Safe Streets) unit and plans to open 50 "mini-stations" and to increase the Department's black representation to 50% by 1977. The STRESS unit had been accused of killing 22 residents and arresting hundreds more without cause during its two-and-a-half-year existence.
- February 15 – The Department of Housing and Urban Development announced a plan to sell 2,000 abandoned homes in Detroit to the city for sale to homesteaders at a price of not more than five dollars per house.
- February 18 – In a special election to fill Vice President Gerald Ford's Grand Rapids Congressional seat, Democrat Richard Vander Veen upset the Republican in what had long been a safe Republican seat. The result was deemed to be a message that Watergate could lead to significant Republican losses in the fall.
- February 24 - Billie Jean King defeated Rosemary Casals in the singles of the 1974 Virginia Slims of Detroit at Cobo Arena. King and Casals teamed up to win the doubles.

=== March ===
- March 2 – Amid the gasoline shortage, a survey showed that 58% of the gas stations in the Detroit area were closed and only three percent of the open stations had gas to sell.
- March 4 – Signs were posted for Michigan's reduced 55 mile per hour speed limit on 1,550 miles of the state's freeways.
- March 6 – The EPA, in its second ever recall order, directed Chrysler to recall 826,000 vehicles to replace temperature sensors in 1973 automobiles.
- March 7 – William Milliken announced that he would run for a second four-year term as Governor of Michigan.
- March 7 – Hundreds of streakers exposed themselves as part of the growing fad. Five days later, another 60 streakers participated in the "First Annual Streak In" on the Diag at the University of Michigan, and four streakers stopped traffic on State Street in Ann Arbor. Ray Stevens' song The Streak was released later in the month.
- March 13 – The Execution of Private Slovik, a television film based on the life of Detroit resident Eddie Slovik who was the only soldier executed for desertion in World War II, aired on ABC.
- March 16 – Harvey Leach, chairman of the Joshua Doore furniture company, was killed and found in the trunk of a Lincoln Continental; the crime was considered to be a professional hit. Five months later, a controlling interest in the company was acquired by a firm owned in part by an associate of Mafia boss Anthony Giacolone.
- March 27 – Former Detroit Mayor Jerome Cavanagh announced at a press conference that he was calling off his campaign for governor after learning he would be required to undergo surgery to remove a kidney on which a malignant tumor had been discovered. He later re-entered the race but lost the Democratic nomination to Sander Levin.

=== April ===
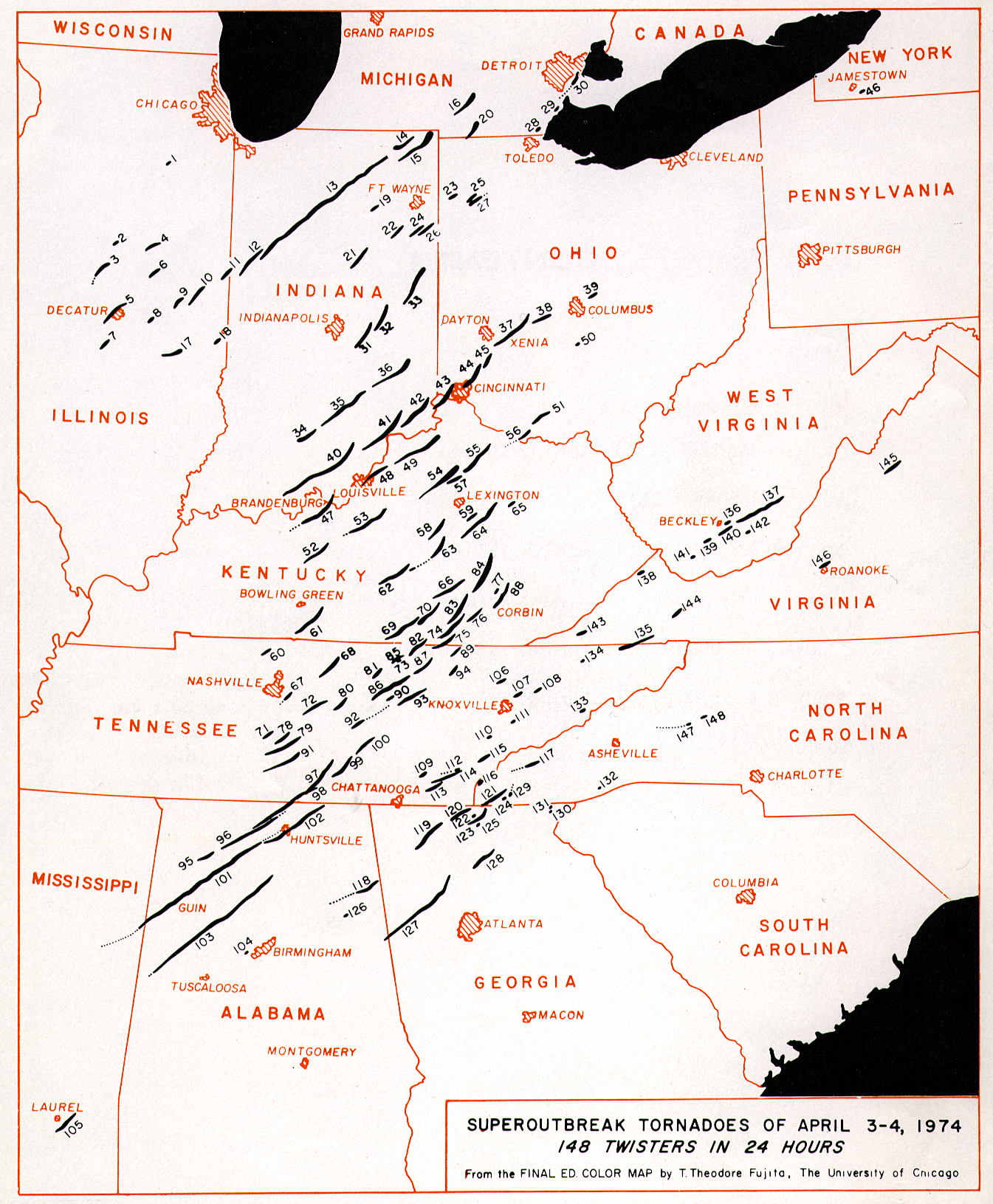
1974 Super Outbreak

- April 1 – Voters in Ann Arbor and Ypsilanti passed amendments to their city charters reducing the penalty for possession or use of marijuana to a fine of five dollars.
- April 4 – In the 1974 Tornado Super Outbreak that left 320 dead from Alabama to Canada, three persons in Michigan.
- April 10 – President Nixon appeared in Michigan's Thumb to campaign for James Sparling in Michigan's 8th Congressional District One week later, Sparling lost to J. Bob Traxler, the first Democrat to win the District since 1932.
- April 18 – The U.S Navy suspended Project Sanguine (later known as Seafarer), a proposed extremely low frequency (ELF) radio antenna intended to cover up to 3,000 square miles of the Upper Peninsula.
- April 26 – General Motors announced that its first quarter profits were down 85% for the company's worst showing since 1948.
- April 29 – Chrysler announced that its first quarter profits were down 98%.

=== May ===
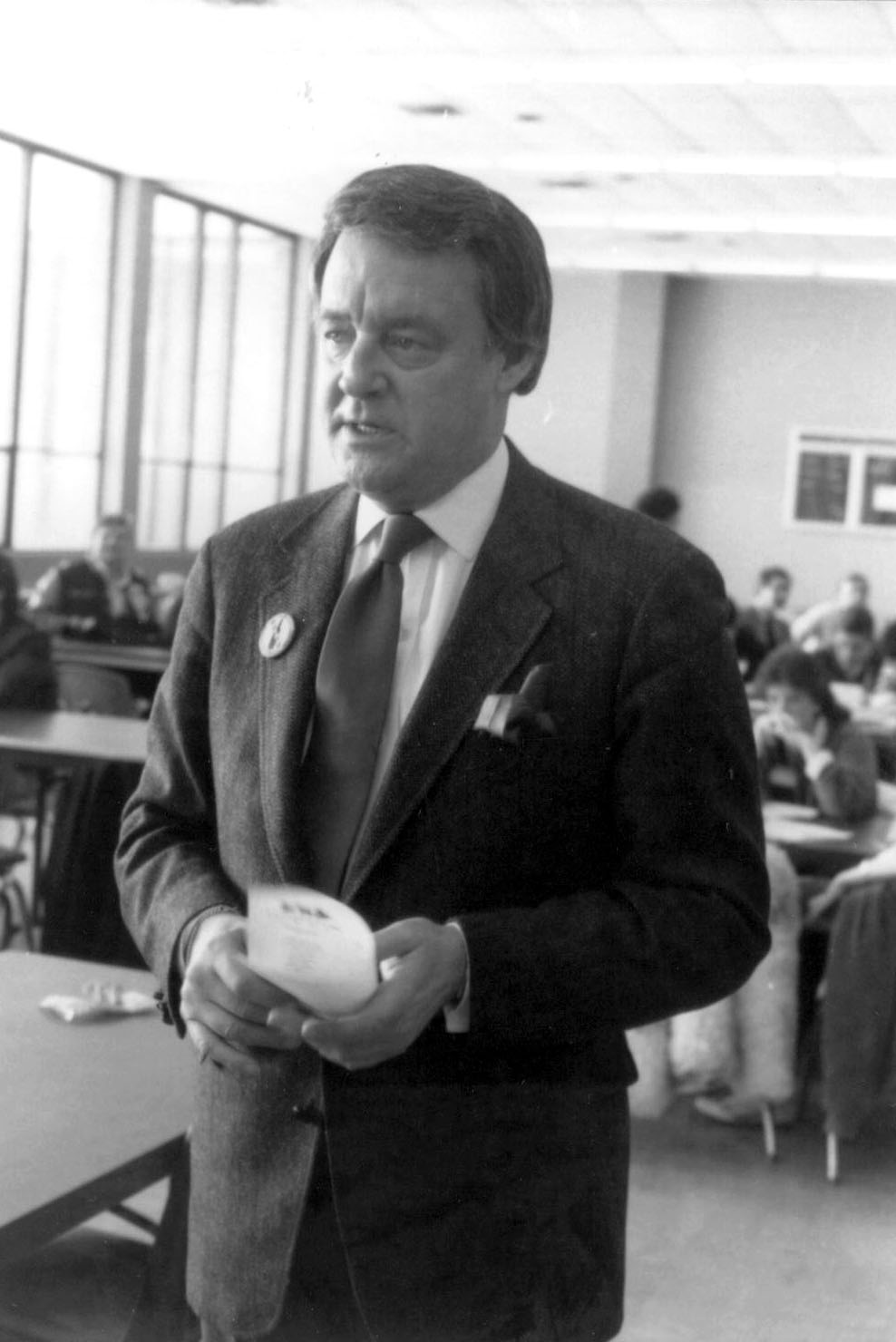
Bill Bonds

- May 5 - The Detroit Free Press reported that Detroit experienced 89 homicides in April, the highest monthly total in city history.
- May 5 - Television newsman Bill Bonds was arrested for drunk driving in West Bloomfield. He pleaded guilty to driving while visibly impaired in October.
- May 10 - Two Teamsters locals at the Stroh Brewery approved a new contract, ending a 40-day strike at the Detroit brewery.
- May 28 - In a growing scandal arising out of cattle feed from the Farm Bureau Service found to be contaminated with the flamer retardant PBB, five more herds of cattle were found to be contaminated. The Public Health Department warned on May 29 that contaminated milk and dairy products from the cows had been distributed statewide and could cause cancer. By May 30, state officials were developing plans to destroy 115,000 chickens, 3,000 cows, and 150 pigs exposed to the contaminated feed.

=== June ===
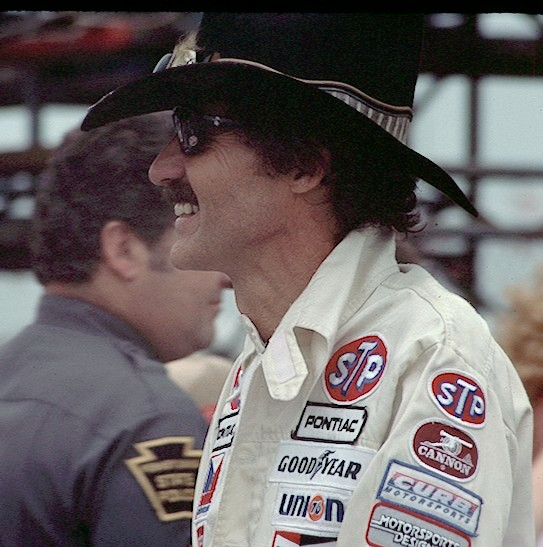
Richard Petty

- June - The Michigan Institute of Improved Sexual Response in Detroit offered weekly sessions, including sexual intercourse with surrogates, to treat sex problems. City and county officials were investigating the clinic's legality.
- June 16 - Richard Petty won the Michigan 400 before a crowd of 51,500 at Michigan International Speedway. The race was reduced by ten percent to 360 miles due to the energy crisis.
- June 24 - The Michigan House of Representatives began an investigation into payments totaling more than $70,000 to Rep. John Smeekens. On August 8, the special panel investigating Smeekens recommended that he be censured for being an expense account cheat. The censure was approved on September 19.

=== July ===
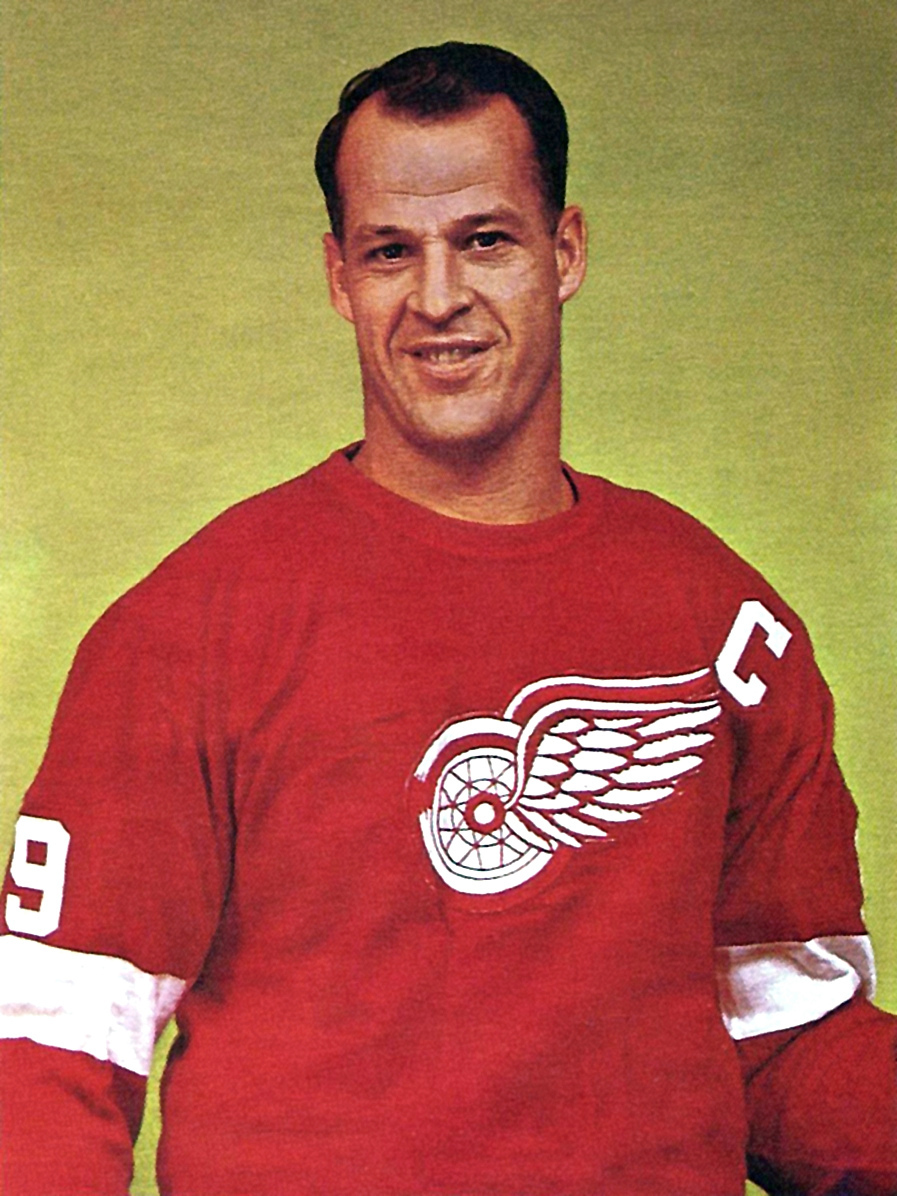
Gordie Howe

- July 1 - Detroit became the largest city in the United States to adopt a provision in its city charter banning discrimination against homosexuals in employment, housing, and public accommodations.
- July 3 - Gordie Howe and his family were presented with the Freedom Award as part of the annual Detroit-Windsor International Freedom Festival.
- July 9 - Jac LeGoff, anchorman on Detroit's CBS affiliate (WJBK) since 1962, signed a 10-year contract with the city's ABC affiliate WXYZ at $100,000 a year.
- July 9 - Unemployment figures for June showed a 70,000 person increase in unemployment with the state's unemployment rate climbing to 10.9%.
- July 19 – A federal judge in Washington, D.C., upheld a presidential ban on Jimmy Hoffa's participation in union affairs until 1980.
- July 21 - Bobby Unser won the Michigan 200 automobile race in front of 46,180 spectators at Michigan International Speedway
- July 22 - In the 50th Port Huron to Mackinac Boat Race, the "Dora IV", a 61-foot customed cutter captained by Lynn Williams of Chicago, was the overall winner, completing the race in 51 hours and 22 minutes, corrected to 49 hours, 20 minutes with its handicap.
- July 25 – The United States Supreme Court ruled in Milliken v. Bradley reversed a lower court order requiring cross-district busing of public school students among 53 school districts in metropolitan Detroit and instead directed the creation of a desegregation plan limited to the Detroit schools.
- July 28 – Detroit Lions head coach Don McCafferty died of a heart attack while mowing the lawn at his home in West Bloomfield.
- July 30 – A station wagon filled with four women, one of whom was pregnant, and four children returning from picking blueberries was struck by a Soo Line freight train in the Upper Peninsula 25 miles southwest of Sault Ste. Marie; only one person survived.

=== August ===
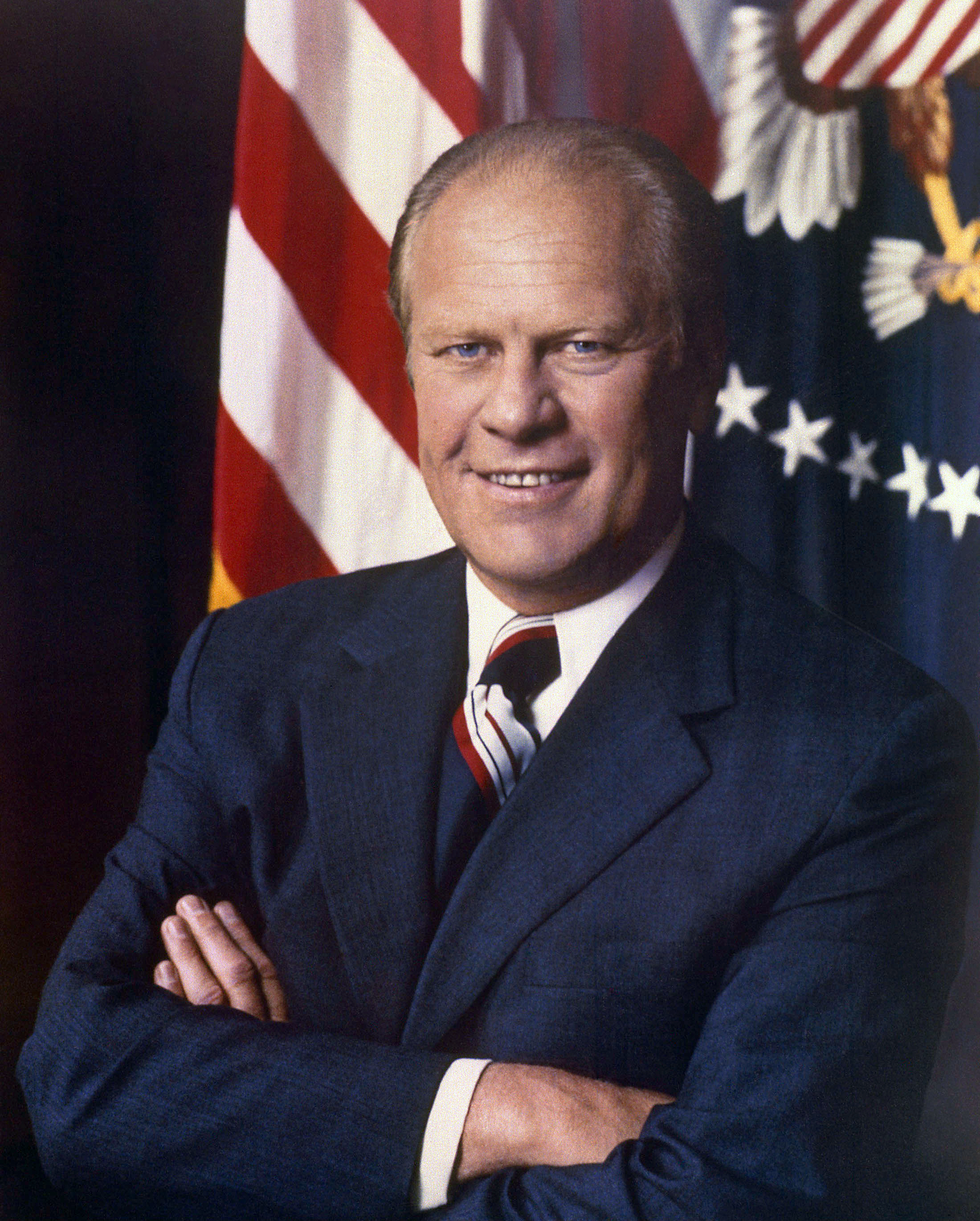
Gerald Ford

- August 5 – U. S. Senate Republican Whip Robert P. Griffin of Michigan held a press conference in which he stated that the national interest and President Nixon's interest would be served by Nixon's resigning.
- August 6 – With 61% of the votes in the Democratic primary, Sander Levin won the Democratic nomination for governor.
- August 9 – Gerald Ford of Michigan was sworn in as the 38th President of the United States and declared "our long national nightmare is over".
- August 12 – President Ford announced that his first priority was a fight against inflation and criticized General Motors for its plan for substantial price increases on 1975 models. Ten days later, General Motors agreed to a partial rollback of its price increases.

=== September ===
- September 7 – Members of the United Steel Workers voted to end a 25-week strike against Dow Chemical Co. in Midland. The strike was the longest in the company's history.
- September 24 - Al Kaline of the Detroit Tigers became the 13th member of baseball's 3,000 hit club with a stand-up double off Dave McNally.
- September 30 - General Motors named Thomas Murphy as its new chairman and CEO, effective December 1. Pete Estes was named president.

=== October ===
- October 3 - The federal government gave Detroit $8.7 million to create 700 jobs for persons unemployed or underemployed.
- October 4 - A federal bankruptcy judge granted the World Football League permission to find a buyer for the Detroit Wheels after the team filed for bankruptcy.
- October 4 - A gambling raid in northeast Detroit resulted in 98 arrests in the city's largest crackdown on gambling since 1968.
- October 10 - Four gunmen held the family of Ypsilanti bank manager Richard Green at gunpoint, forcing him to rob his own bank of $35,000 as ransom.
- October 13 - A nationwide survey conducted by the University of Michigan found consumer sentiment about the economy to be at its lowest point in 25 years with conditions that "might make for a real recession".
- October 20 - Altie Taylor scored two touchdowns, and Errol Mann kicked two field goals, as the Detroit Lions ended a 13-game losing streak against the Minnesota Vikings with a 20–16 victory in Minneapolis.
- October 23 - Chrysler announced that it had sustained an $8 million loss in the third quarter.
- October 25 - General Motors announced that its third quarter profits were down 94% from $267 million in 1973 to $16 million.
- October 25 - The City of Detroit settled a racial discrimination lawsuit against the Detroit Boat Club and Detroit Yacht Club, both of which leased space on Belle Isle from the city; the settlement required both clubs to admit additional black members within 90 days.

=== November ===
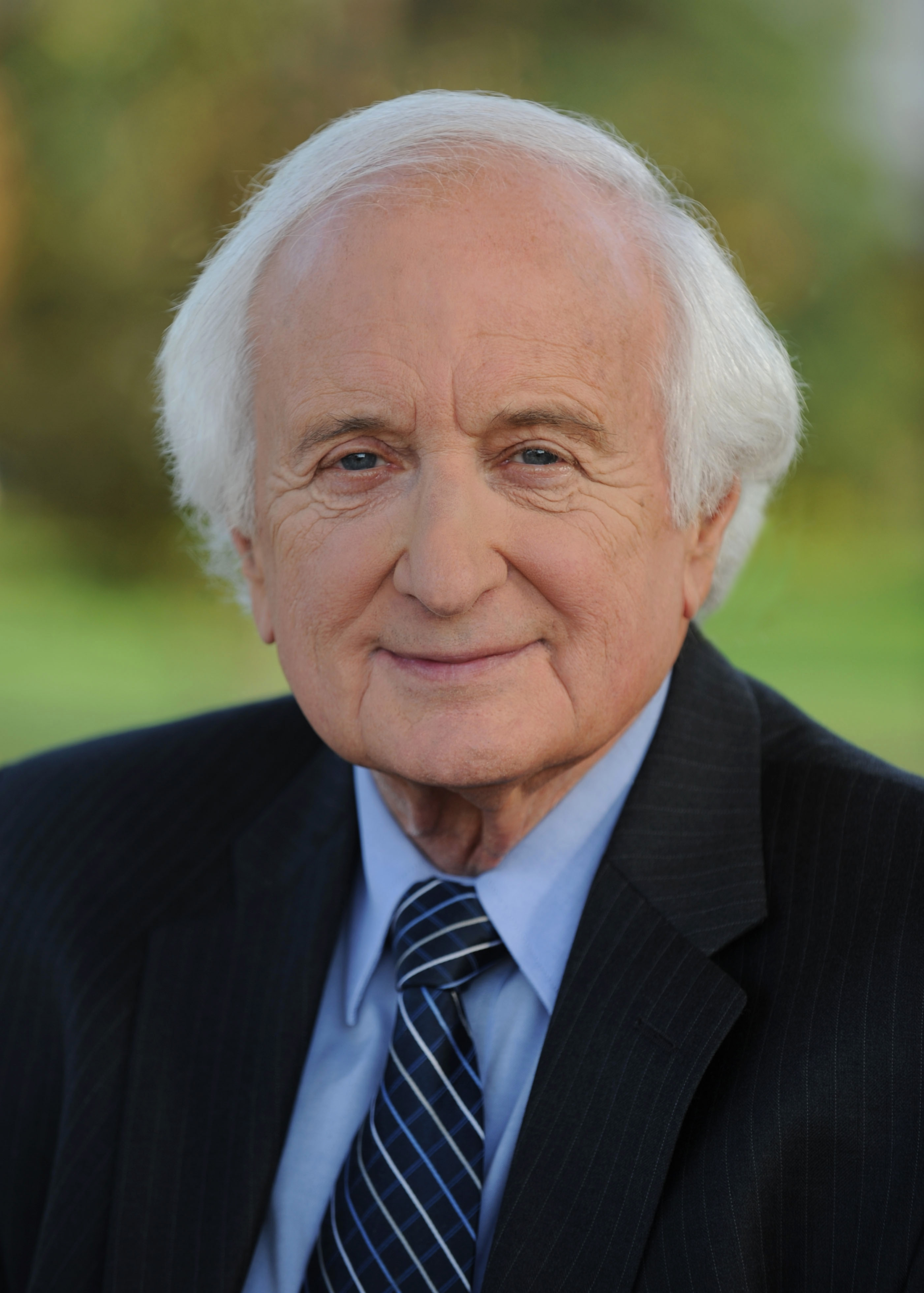
Sander Levin

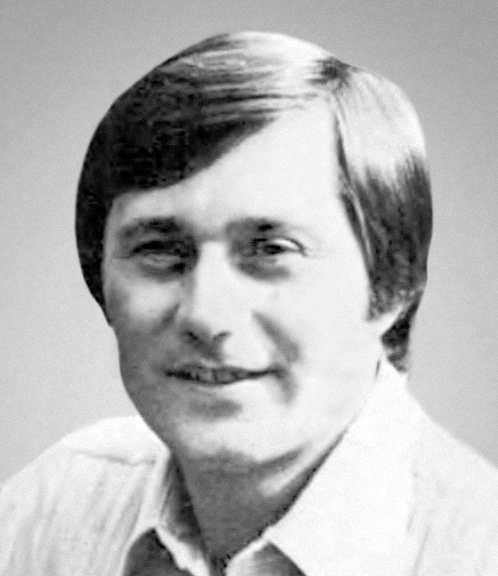
James Blanchard

- November 2 - UAW vice president and civil rights leader Nelson "Jack" Edwards was killed by a stray bullet in a Detroit bar.
- November 3 - Dearborn Mayor and segregationist Orville L. Hubbard suffered a stroke and underwent brain surgery the following day. Officially, Hubbard remained mayor until 1978, but the City Council president served as mayor pro tem, running the city on a day-to-day basis, for the rest of Hubbard's final term.
- November 5

- William Milliken was re-elected as Governor with 51.07% of the vote over Sander Levin who garnered 46.75% of the vote and Zolton Ferency who garnered 1.08% of the vote.
- In elections for the U. S. House of Representatives, Democrats gained ground. Democrat James Blanchard (59.0%) unseated Republican incumbent Robert J. Huber (40.4%). Democrat Milton Robert Carr also won in a previously Republican district. Democrat William M. Brodhead won the seat previously held by Martha Griffiths. Donald W. Riegle Jr. was reelected after changing his party affiliation from Republican to Democrat. Democrats Richard Vander Veen and J. Bob Traxler were reelected in historically Republican district which they had won earlier in the year in special elections.
- Attorney General Frank J. Kelley (D) and Secretary of State Richard H. Austin (D) were reelected by two-to-one margins.
- The Democratic Party also won control over the Michigan legislature for the first time since the early 1960s, winning control of the Senate and retaining control of the House of Representatives.
- Proposition C, a statewide ballot initiative to repeal the state sales tax on food and drugs, was approved by a margin of 56% to 44%.

- November 9 - The Michigan State Spartans football team upset Ohio State (ranked No. 1 in the AP Poll) by a score of 16 to 13 in East Lansing. The Spartans held Ohio State at its own one-yard line as the game ended.
- November 19 - Chrysler announced plans to close four of its five automobile assembly plants due to slow sales of its automobiles.
- November 21 - Ford Motor announced that it was indefinitely laying off 3,000 white collar workers.
- November 22 - Ford Motor announced that it would temporarily lay off an additional 35,000 workers as part of a December production cut back. Ford's announcement raised the total planned layoffs in the automobile industry to more than 200,000 workers.
- November 23 - The undefeated Michigan Wolverines football team (ranked No. 2 in the UPI Poll) lost to Ohio State (ranked No. 3 in the UPI Poll) by a score of 12 to 10. With 18 second remaining, Michigan kicker Mike Lantry attempted a 33-yard field goal which was called wide left by the officials.
- November 27 - Ford Motor announced plans to lay off an addition 7,950 workers, 2,300 of them indefinitely.
- November 28 - An estimated 500,000 persons lined the route of the Hudson's Thanksgiving Day Parade along Woodward Avenue in Detroit.
- November 29 - General Motors announced plans to place an additional 24,000 hourly workers on indefinite layoff in January. The decision brought the total of General Motors layoffs to 41,000.

=== December ===
- December 1–2 - A snowstorm dropped 18.9 inches of snow on metropolitan Detroit in a 24-hour period. The snowfall was the most in the area since 1886 and resulted in 32 deaths from heart attacks to persons shoveling snow or pushing automobiles.
- December 12 - At an automobile industry summit meeting, President Ford pledged support for measures to increase automobile sales, including a freeze on new anti-pollution and safety regulations, a tax cut, and rebates for new car buyers.
- December 14 - The 1974 Central Michigan Chippewas football team defeated Delaware in the Camellia Bowl to win the NCAA Division II football championship.
- December 16 - American Motors announced plans to lay off 15,150 workers in January.
- December 18 - General Motors announced additional layoffs, increasing to 132,000 the number of the company's hourly workers to be laid off in the first quarter of 1975.

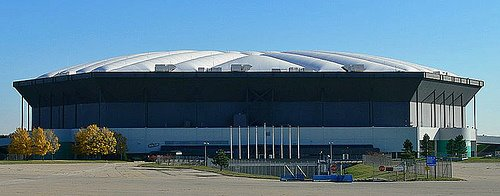
Pontiac Silverdome

- December 19 - Ford Motor announced additional layoff, increasing to 90,00 the number of its hourly workers to be laid off in the first quarter of 1975.
- December 20 - The Pontiac City Commission voted to approve a $7.1 million loan to allow a roof to be added to a stadium (the Pontiac Silverdome) planned for the city to host Detroit Lions games starting in 1975.
- December 23 - The Detroit Housing and Urban Development office announced plans to increase demolition of homes in Detroit. It was estimated that 500 HUD houses were being abandoned each month in Detroit.

== Births ==
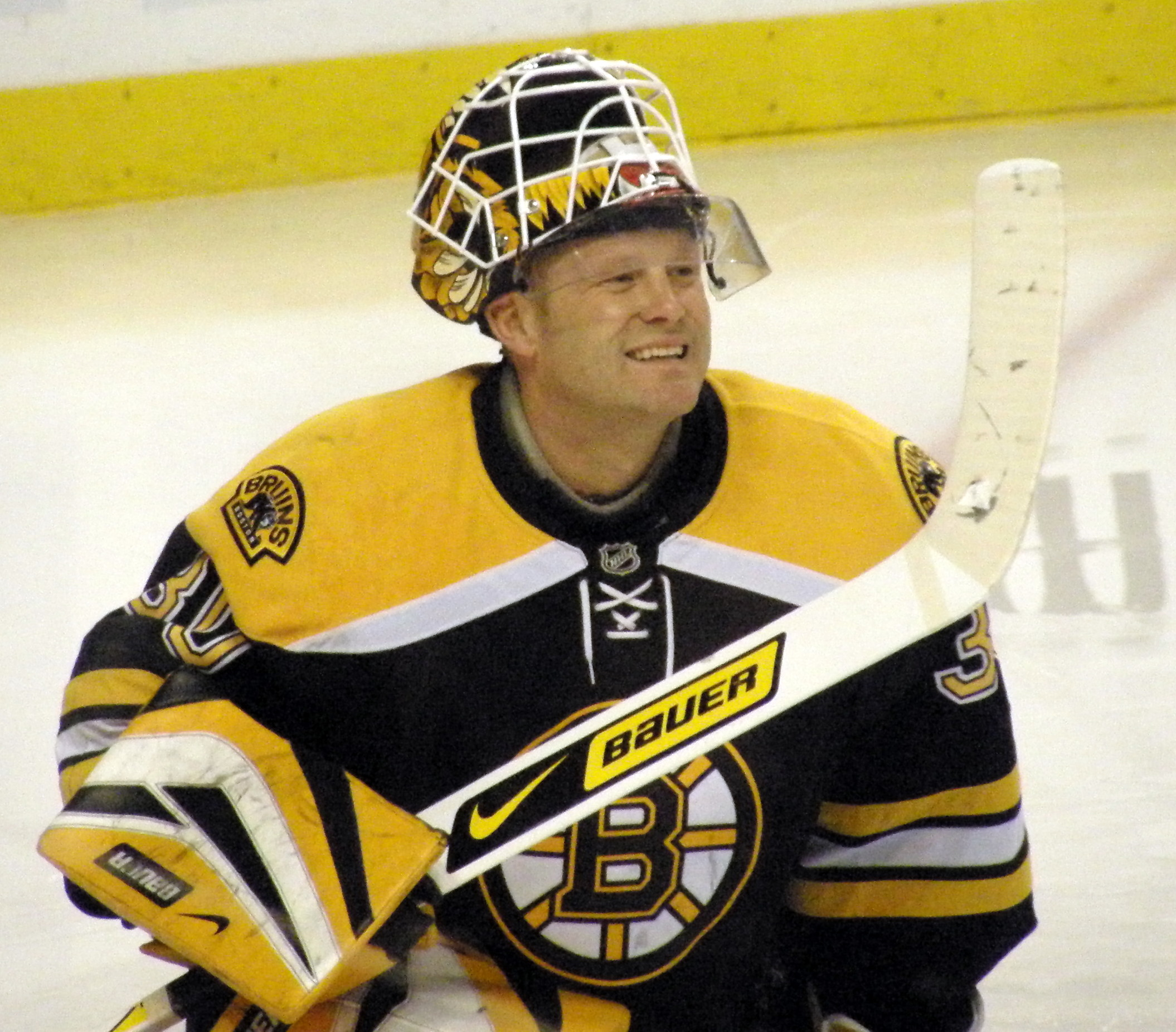
Conn Smythe winner Tim Thomas

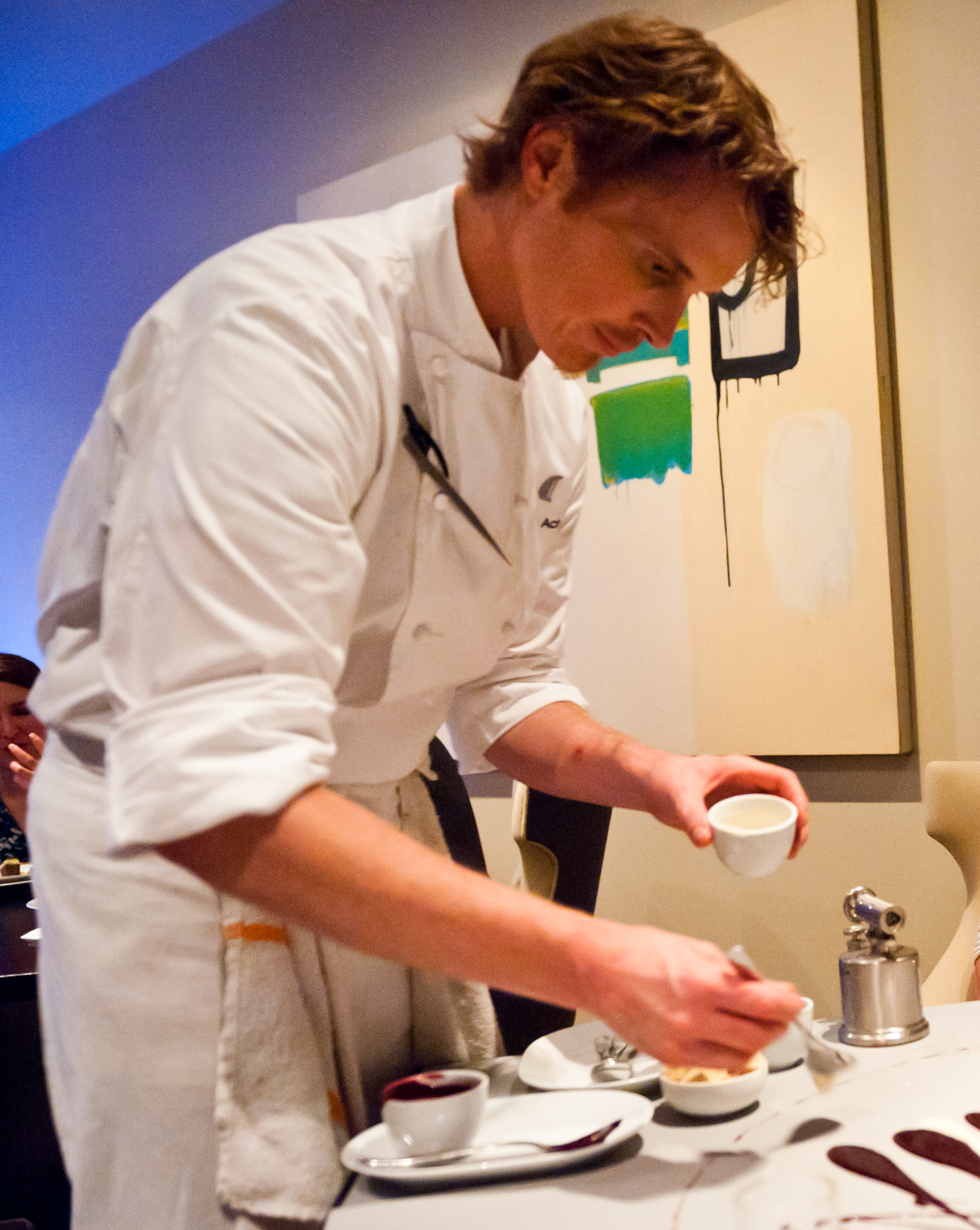
Chef Grant Achatz

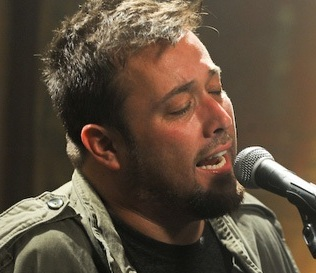
Musician and singer Uncle Cracker

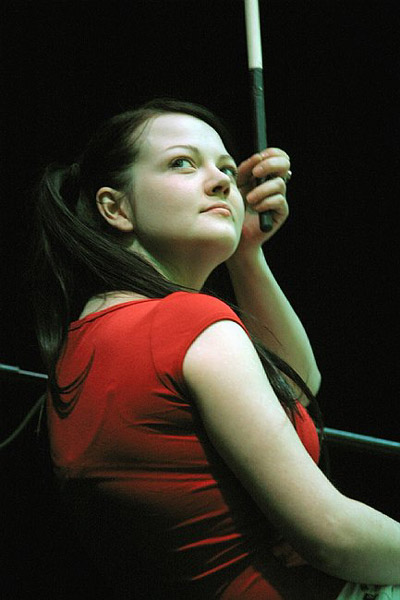
Meg White of The White Stripes

- January 4 - Carl Powell, American football defensive tackle, in Detroit
- January 4 - Zak Knutson, director, producer, writer, and actor, in Detroit
- January 11 - Rod Jones, American football offensive lineman (started in Super Bowl XXXVI for the St. Louis Rams), in Detroit
- January 13 - Mary Jo Sanders, boxer (daughter of Charlie Sanders), in Auburn Hills
- January 17 - Derrick Mason, American football wide receiver (first-team All-Pro, 2000), in Detroit
- January 23 - Christian Longo, murderer who was subject of film True Story, in Ypsilanti Township
- February 2 - Jeff Cassar, soccer goalkeeper and coach, in Livonia
- February 7 - J Dilla (1974–2006), record producer and rapper (part of Slum Village), in Detroit
- February 8 - Susan May Pratt, actress (including 10 Things I Hate About You and Center Stage), in Lansing
- March 3 - Dayne Walling, mayor of Flint, in Flint
- March 5 - Jill Ritchie, actress (including D.E.B.S.), in Romeo
- March 24 - Jamie Arnold, baseball pitcher (MLB 1999-2000), in Dearborn
- April 5 - Colette Nelson, professional bodybuilder, in Southfield
- April 15 - Tim Thomas, ice hockey goaltender (2x Vezina Trophy, 2011 Conn Smythe Trophy and Stanley Cup, in Flint
- April 23 - Barry Watson, actor (including 7th Heaven, Samantha Who?) in Traverse City
- April 25 - Grant Achatz, chef and restaurateur (Alinea, "Best Chef in the United States" for 2008), in St. Clair
- April 26 - Sydney Johnson, college basketball coach, in Lansing
- May 10 - Travis Roy, soccer player (1998 NPSL Rookie of the Year), in Detroit
- June 2 - Skillz, rapper (including acclaimed 1996 album From Where???) in Detroit
- June 6 - Uncle Cracker, musician and singer (including top 10 hits "Follow Me" and "Drift Away" ) in Mount Clemens
- July 2 - Kerry Zavagnin, soccer midfielder (USA national team, 2000–2006), in Plymouth
- July 12 - Trent Vanegas, blogger (Pink is the New Blog), in Detroit
- July 20 - Andrea Phillips, transmedia game designer and writer (including Perplex City), in Michigan (city unknown)
- July 21 - Brett Hinchliffe, baseball pitcher born with fused fingers, in Detroit
- July 27 - Brian Sikorski, baseball relief pitcher, in Detroit
- August 2 - Paul Grasmanis, American football defensive lineman, in Grand Rapids
- August 13 - Scott MacRae, relief pitcher, in Dearborn
- August 16 - John Snyder, baseball pitcher, in Southfield
- August 22 - Iris Kyle, professional bodybuilder (10x Ms. Olympia), in Benton Harbor
- August 24 - Eric Menk, basketball player (3x PBL MVP 1997–1999, PBA MVP 2005), in Grand Rapids
- September 2 - Inari Vachs, pornographic actress (2012 AVN Hall of Fame inductee), in Detroit
- September 18 - Xzibit, rapper, actor, television host, and record producer (host of Pimp My Ride), in Detroit
- October 6 - Jim Bundren, American football offensive lineman, in Pontiac
- October 14 - Shaggy 2 Dope of Insane Clown Posse in Wayne
- October 27 - Harold Cronk, motion picture director (including God's Not Dead), in Reed City
- October 28 - Jake Kasdan, motion picture and television director, in Detroit
- October 28 - Justin Hicks, professional golfer, in Wyandotte
- November 8 - Ryan Folmar, college baseball coach, in Hillsdale
- November 9 - Joe C. (1974–2000), hype man and comic relief for Kid Rock, in Taylor
- November 9 - Richard H. Bernstein, legally blind member of Michigan Supreme Court, in Detroit
- November 9 - Rico Hoye, boxer, in Monroe
- November 15 - Kathleen Rose Perkins, actress (including Episodes), in New Baltimore
- December 5 - Stacey Lovelace-Tolbert, basketball player in WNBA, in Detroit
- December 7 - Annette Salmeen, Rhodes Scholar and gold medalist in swimming at 1996 Olympics, in Ann Arbor
- December 9 - Sam Sword, American football linebacker, in Saginaw
- December 9 - Sarah Roberts, state legislator, in St. Clair Shores
- December 10 - Meg White of The White Stripes in Grosse Pointe Farms
- December 17 - Duff Goldman, pastry chef and television personality (including Ace of Cakes, in Detroit
- December 20 - Jennifer Haase, state legislator, in Detroit
- December 27 - Daniel Way, writer for Marvel Comics (including Wolverine: Origins and Deadpool), in West Branch
- Date unknown - David Robert Mitchell, film director and writer (including It Follows), in Clawson
- Date unknown - Ray Chi, architect, cellist, film editor, and furniture designer, in Okemos

=== Gallery of 1974 births ===
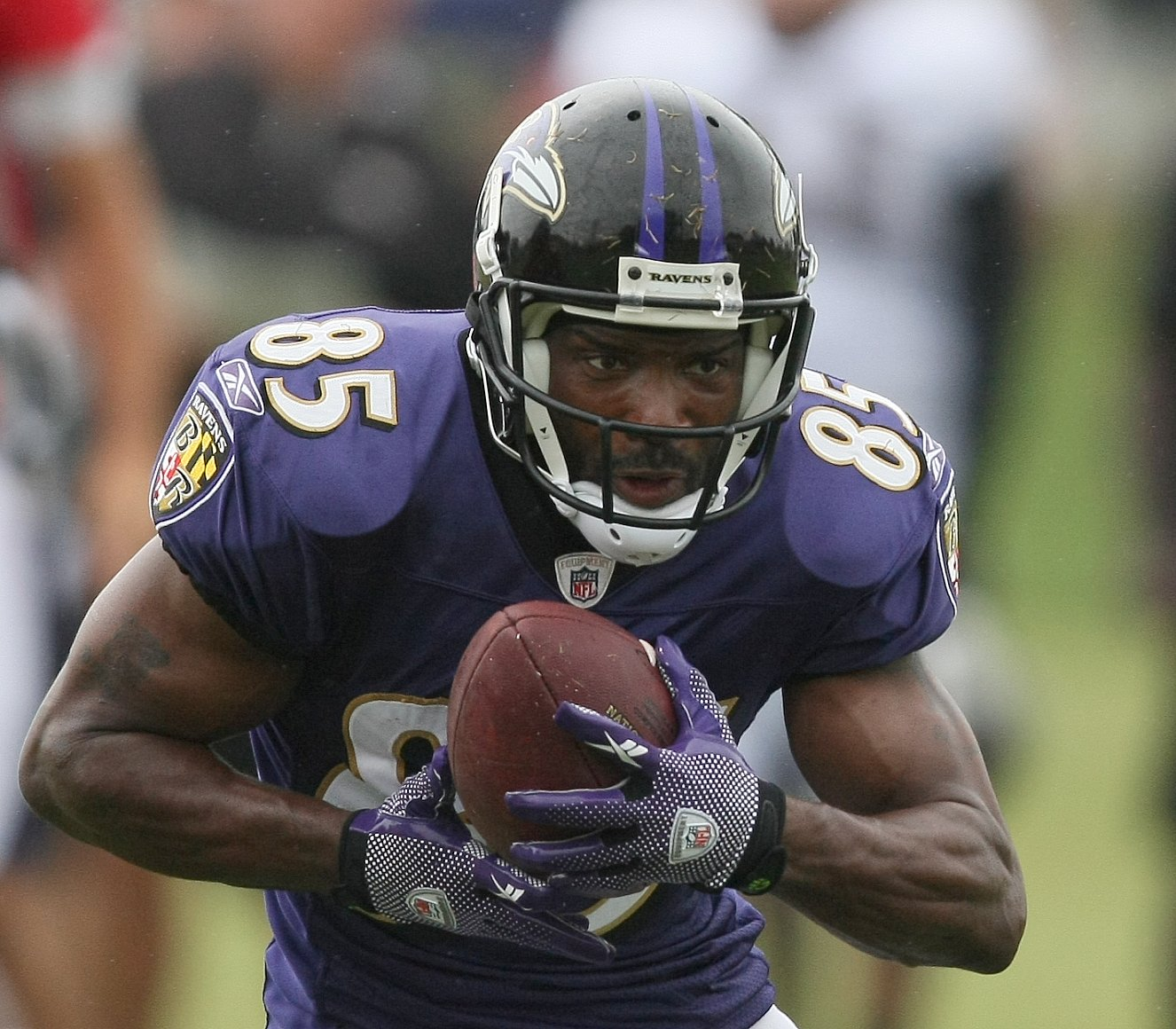
Derrick Mason

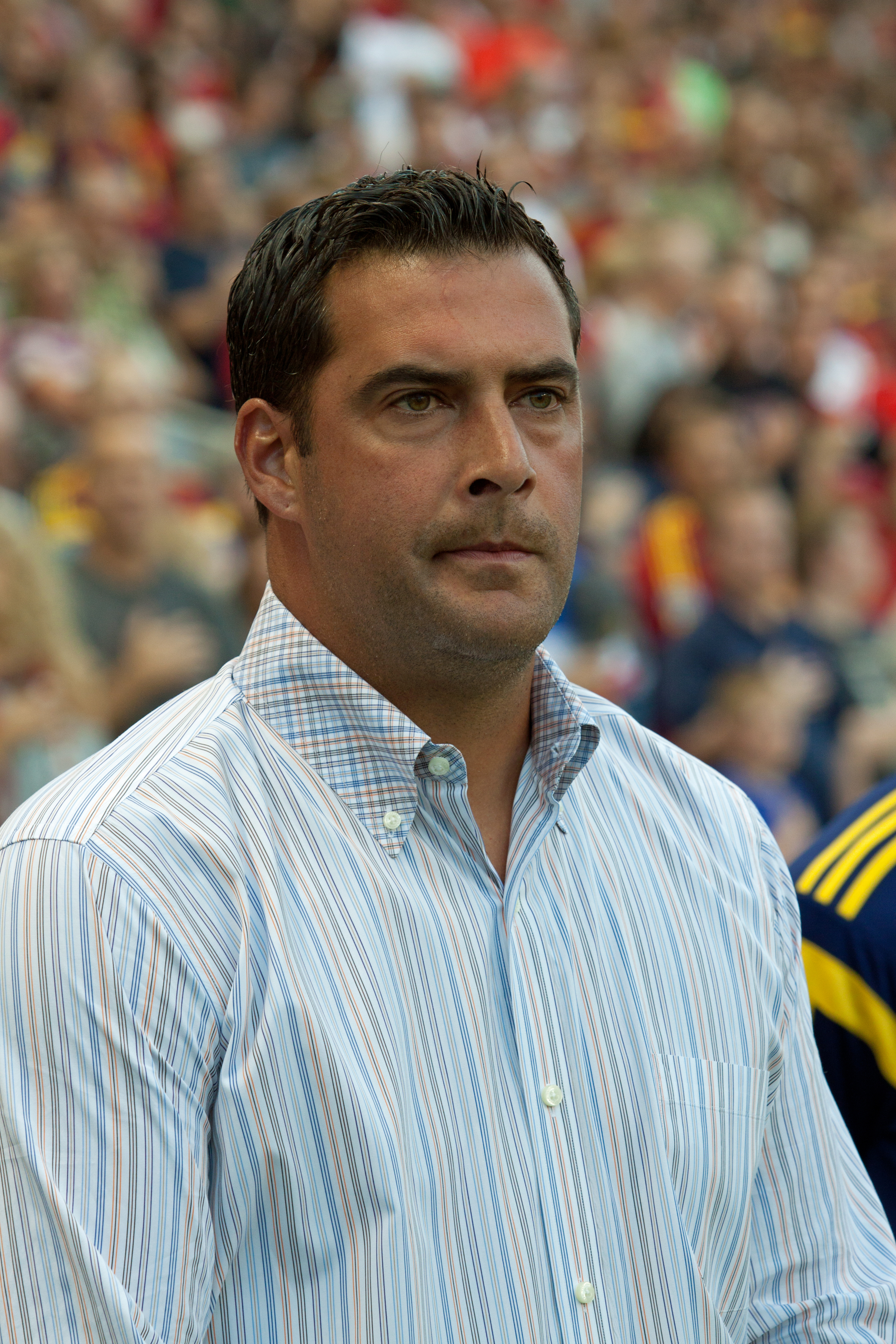
Jeff Cassar

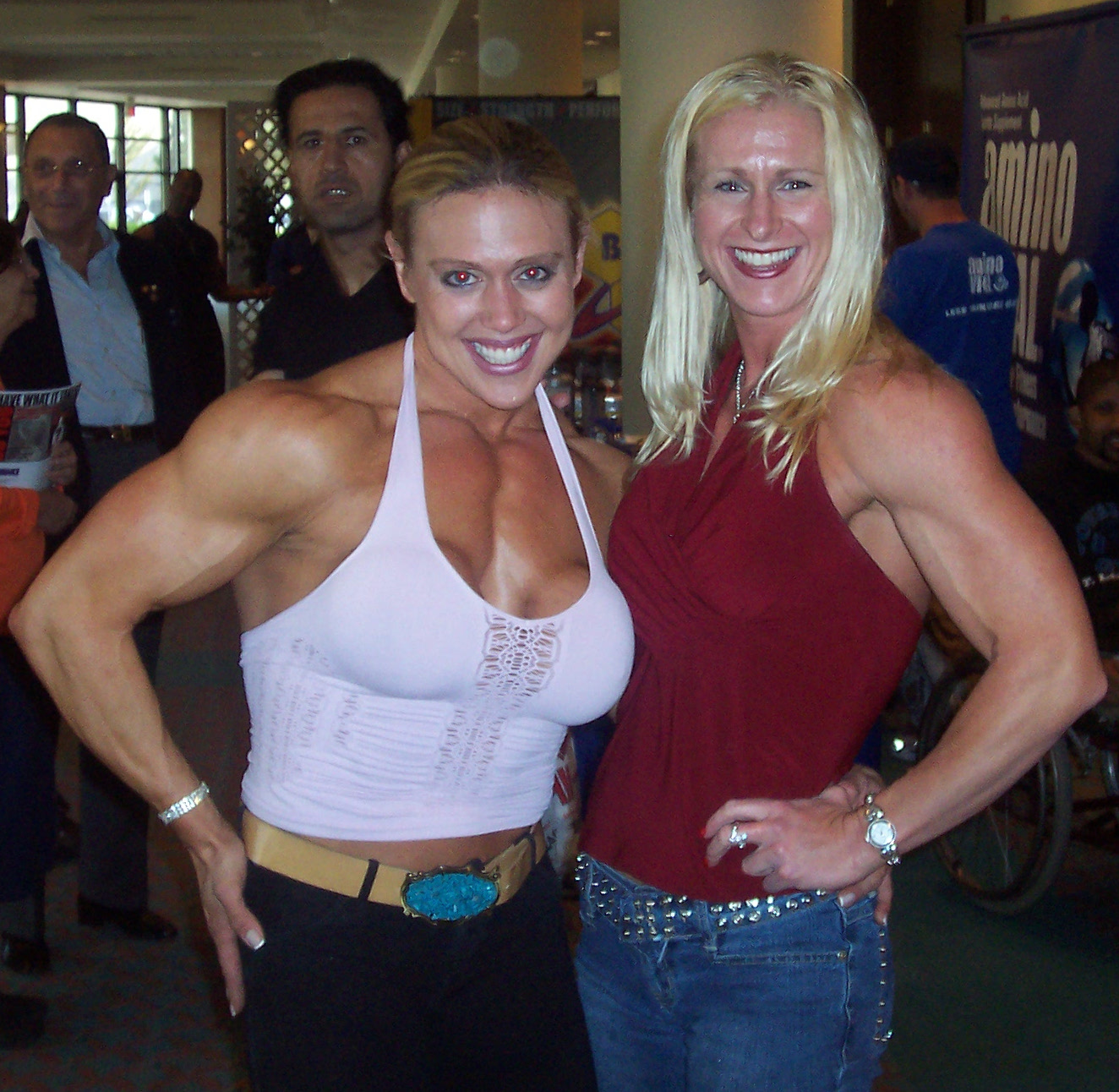
Colette Nelson (left)

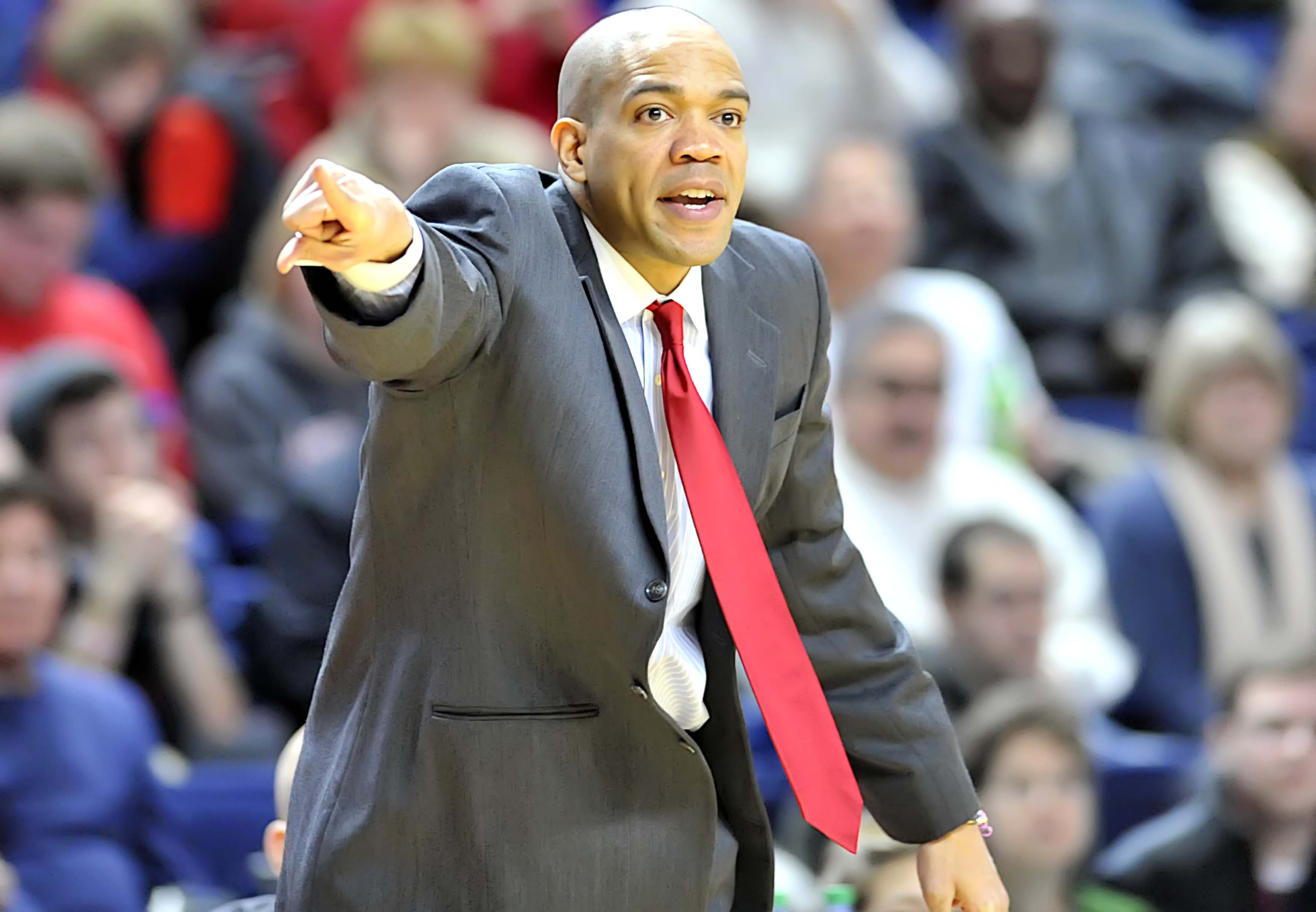
Sydney Johnson

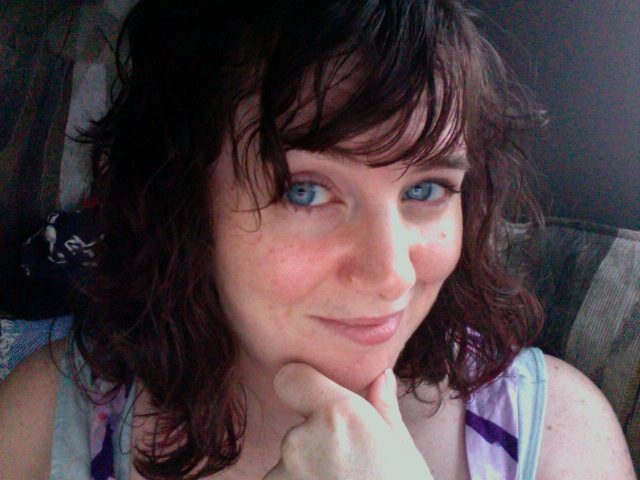
Andrea Phillips

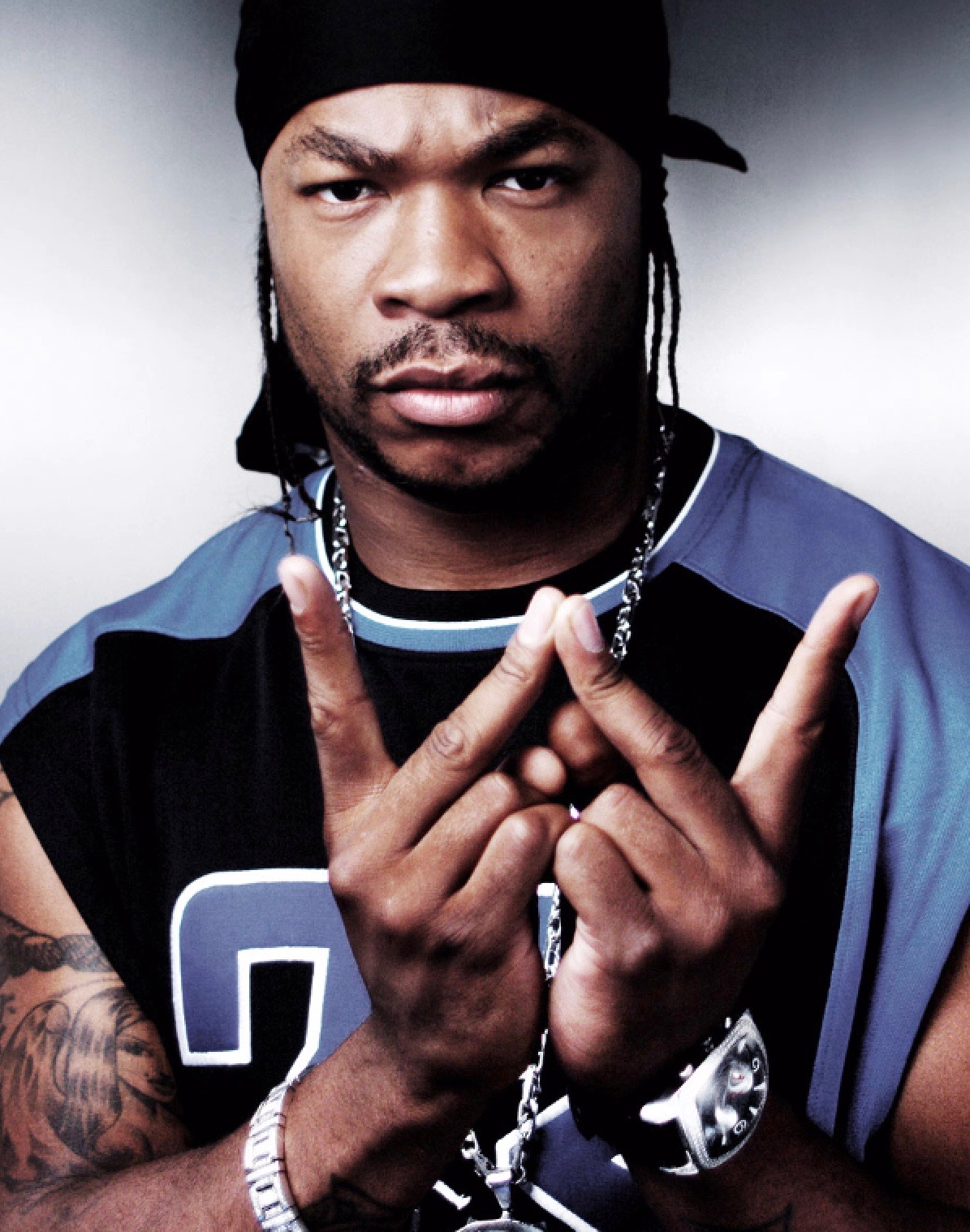
Xzibit

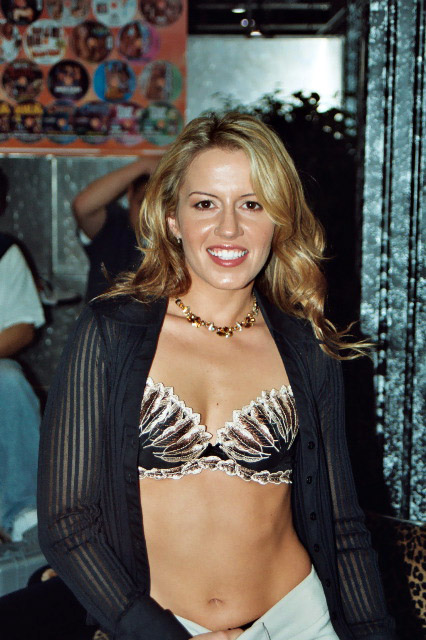
Inari Vachs

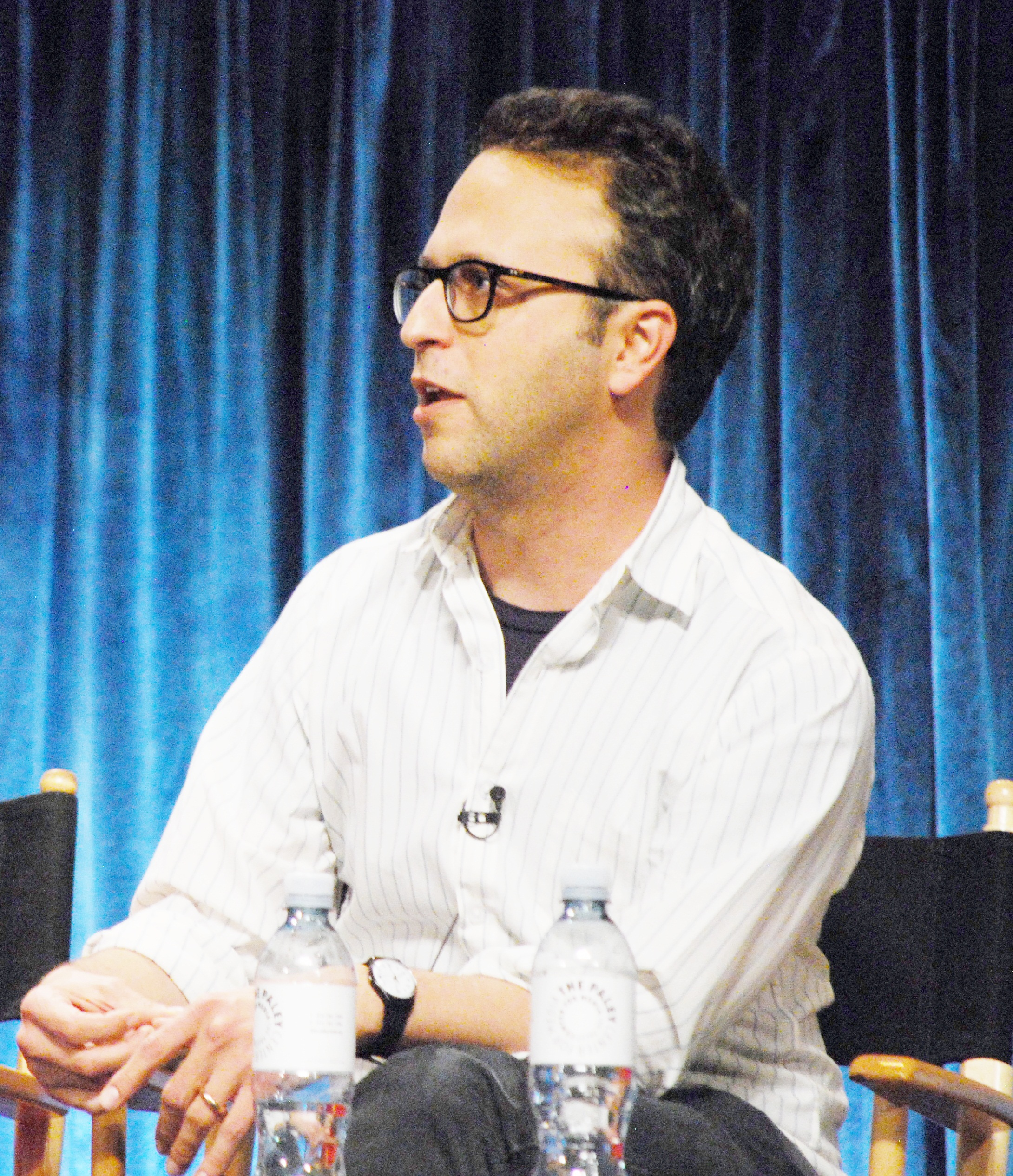
Jake Kasdan

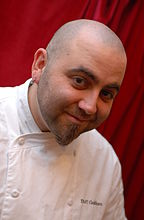
Duff Goldman

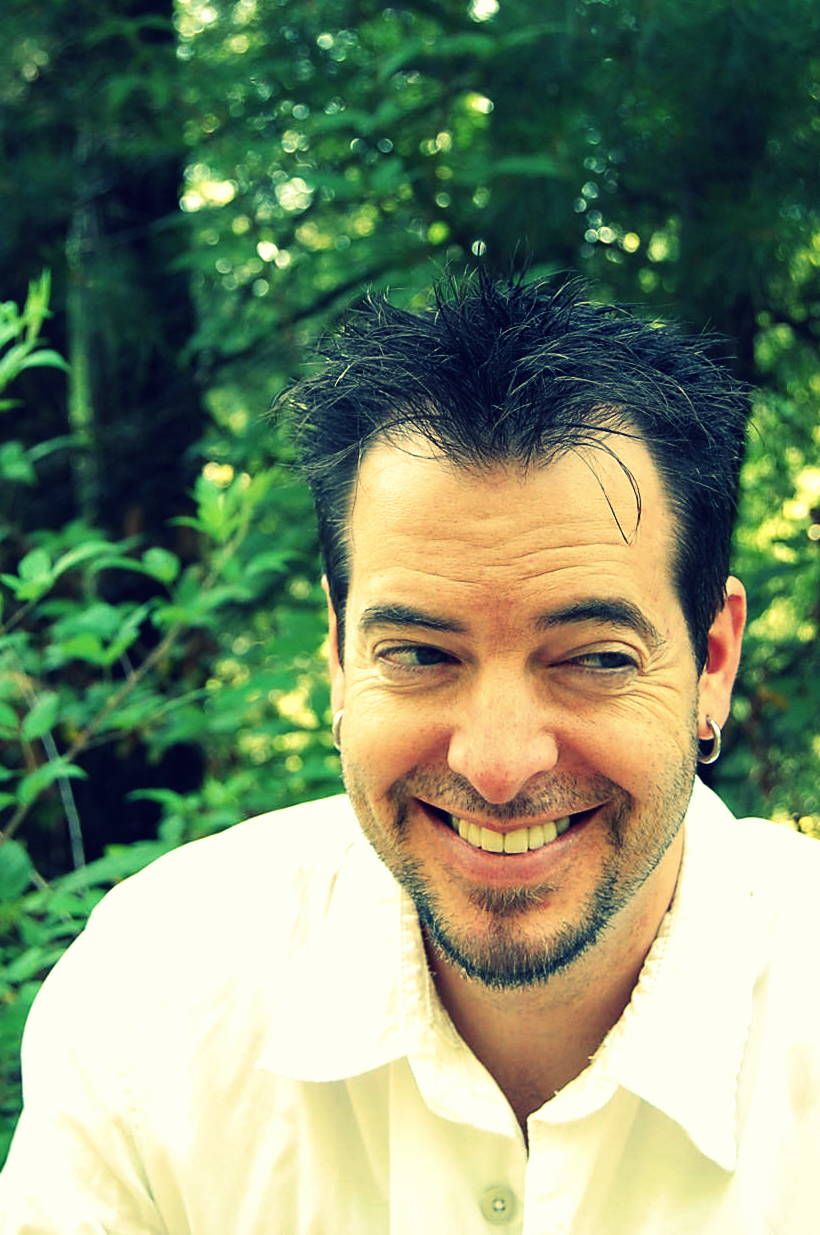
Daniel Way

== Deaths ==
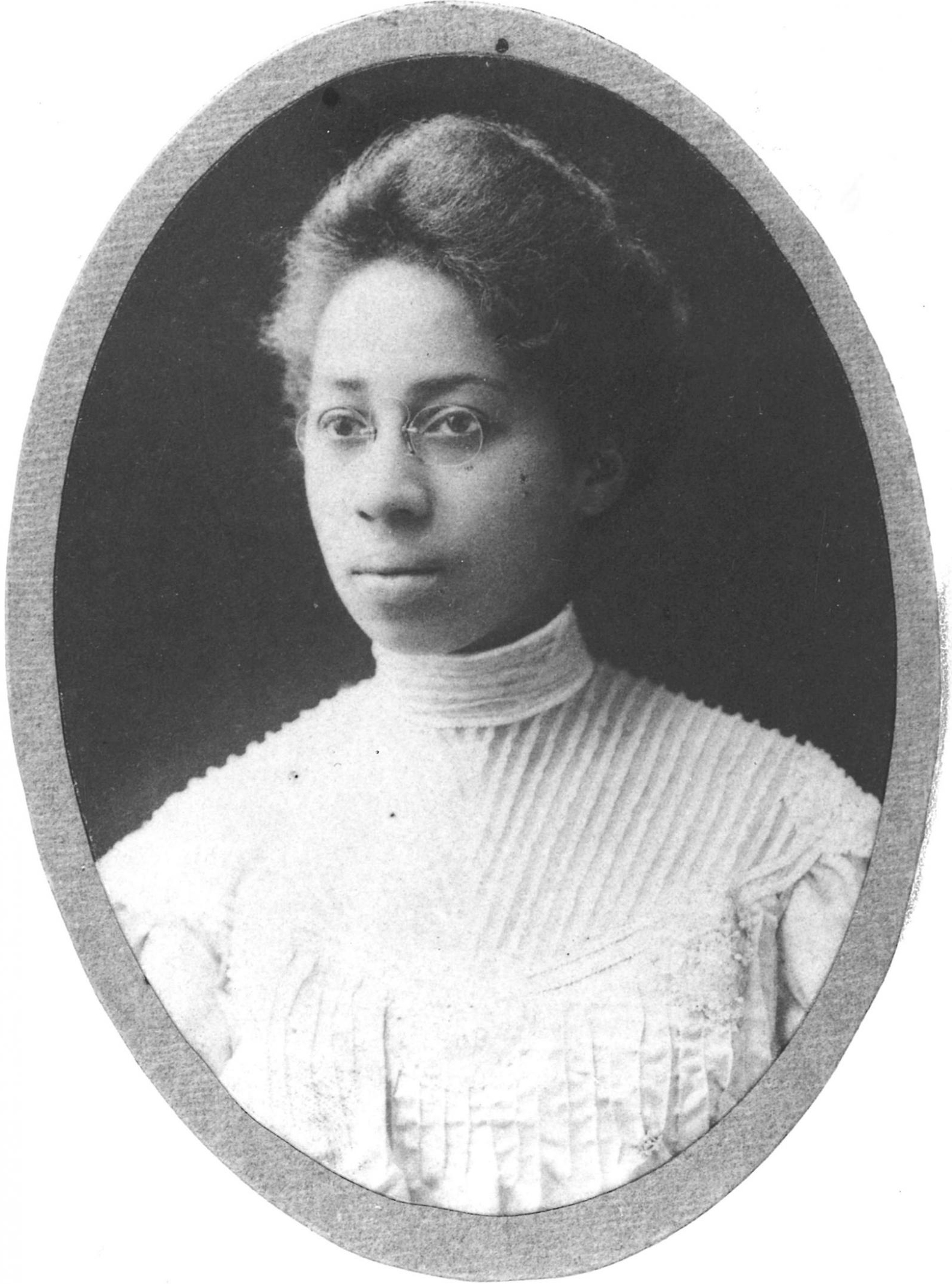
Myrtle Craig Mowbray, first African-American female graduate of MSU

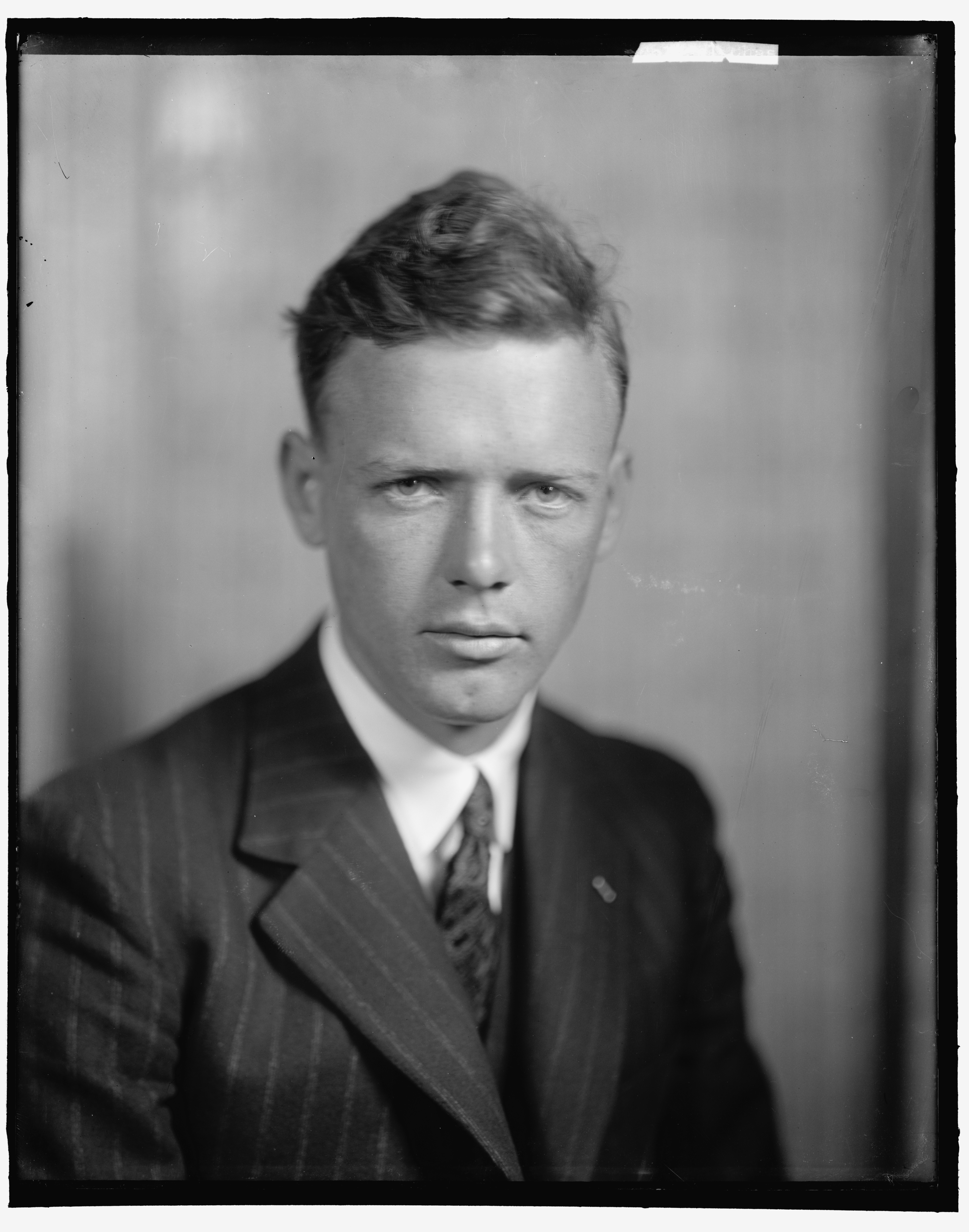
Detroit native Charles Lindbergh

- January 6 - Rev. William Foley, former athletic director at the University of Detroit, in Clarkston at age 96
- January 7 - Sam "Singing Sam" Bolgona, tenor and restaurant operator who for 45 years entertained patrons by singing Italian opera
- January 8 - Kreigh Collins, creator of the comic strips "Kevin the Bold" and "Up Anchor", in Grand Rapids at age 66
- January 12 - John Elias, co-founder of the Elias Brothers Big Boy restaurants, the largest restaurant chain in Michigan, at age 54
- January 14 - Wilbur M. Cunningham, American football player and coach, attorney, historian and author, in Benton Harbor at age 87
- January 16 - Roy Bargy, composer and pianist, in Vista, CA, at age 79
- January 17 - Arthur Radebaugh, futurist, illustrator, airbrush artist, and industrial designer, in Grand Rapids at age 67
- February 14 - Frank "Bullet" Miller, baseball pitcher, in Allegan at age 87
- February 15 - Maurice Sugar, pioneer labor lawyer, general counsel to UAW (1937-1948), at his home on Black Lake at age 81
- February 17 - Ralph W. Gerard, neurophysiologist and behavioral scientist, at age 73
- March 9 - Felix Schlag, sculptor and designer of the U.S. five cent coin in use from 1938 to 2004), in Owosso at age 82
- March 16 - Daniel Frank Gerber, who built baby food manufacturer Gerber Products Co. into a Fortune 500 company, at Gerber Memorial Hospital in Fremont, Michigan, at age 73
- March 22 - Sam Donahue, swing musician, at age 56
- March 31 - Dirk Gringhuis, artist and illustrator, at age 55
- April 3 - Marston Bates, biologist and leading expert on mosquitoes, malaria, and yellow fever, in Ann Arbor at age 67
- April 4 - Leland I. Doan, former president of Dow Chemical Co., in Midland at age 79
- May 7 - Hobart Hurd Willard, analytical chemist and inorganic chemist, in Ann Arbor at age 92
- May 16 - William Hayes, burlesque actor, in Detroit at age 81
- May 24 - Clyde Cowan, physicist and co-discoverer of the neutrino, in Bethesda, MD, at age 54
- June 30 - Tony Fontane, gospel singer, in California at age 48
- July 10 – Stephen John Roth, U.S. District Court Judge who ordered cross-district busing in metropolitan Detroit, in Flint at age 66
- July 24 - Carl E. Guthe, academic, anthropologist, and dean, at age 81
- July 27 - Blues musician Lightnin' Slim in Detroit
- July 28 – Don McCafferty, head coach of the Detroit Lions, in Pontiac at age 53
- June 30 - Gene Gazlay, director of the Michigan Department of Natural Resources, from a heart attack at Groesbeck Golf Course in Lansing, at age 50
- August 19 - Augie Bergamo, baseball player, in Grosse Pointe at age 56
- August 26 – Charles Lindbergh, aviator and Detroit native, in Hawaii at age 72
- September 15 - John Challis, builder of harpsichords and clavichords, at age 67
- September 29 - Van Patrick, sportscast who did play-by-play for Detroit Tigers and Detroit Lions, in South Bend, IN, at age 58
- September 29 - Herbert C. Holdridge, U.S. Army brigadier general, in Toledo
- October 5 - Robert G. Robinson, the first aviator to receive the Medal of Honor, for his service in World War I, in St. Ignace at age 80
- October 13 - Otto Binder, comic book author (including Captain Marvel), in Chestertown, NY, at age 63
- October 18 - Tate Houston, jazz saxophonist, at age 49
- October 21 - Donald Goines, novelist (including the Kenyatta series), in Detroit at age 37
- October 27 - Jay Datus, artist known primarily for his mural painting in Arizona
- November 2 - Nelson "Jack" Edwards, UAW vice president and civil rights leader, in Detroit at age 57
- November 15 - Nathaniel B. Wales, inventor credited with inventing the Kelvinator refrigerator and early patents on washers, vacuum cleaners, and a proximity detonator for bombs
- November 15 - Myrtle Craig Mowbray, first African American woman to graduate from Michigan Agricultural College
- November 23 - Jerry Benjamin, baseball outfielder (3x Negro leagues All-Star), in Detroit at age 65
- December 19 - Russell D. Oliver, American football player, in South Bend, IN
- December 23 - John Hiemenga, first president of Calvin College
- December 25 - Frederick L. Conklin, American football player, doctor, and Navy officer, in San Diego, CA, at age 86
- December 31 - Former Lieutenant Governor George W. Welsh

=== Gallery of 1974 deaths ===
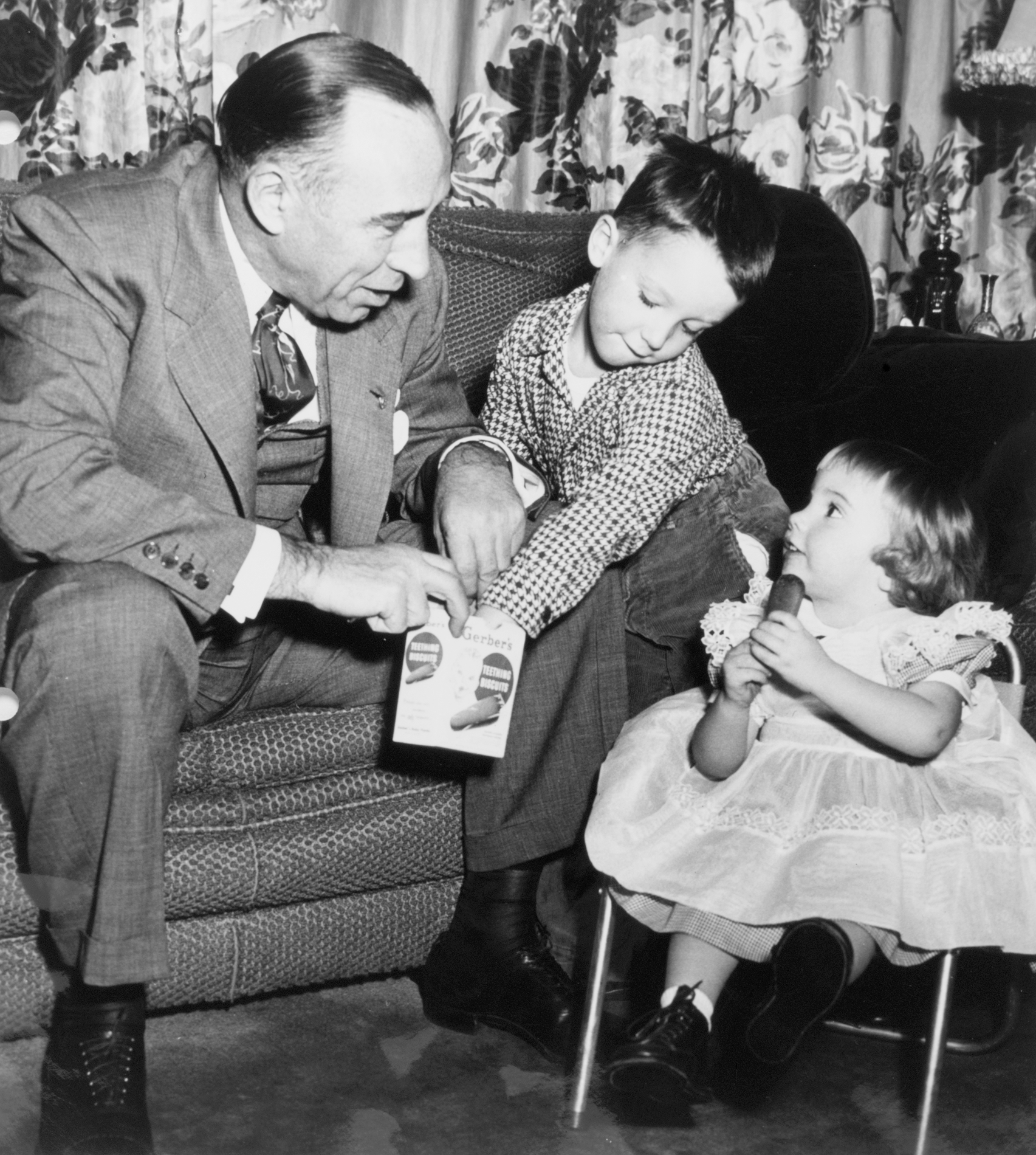
Daniel Frank Gerber

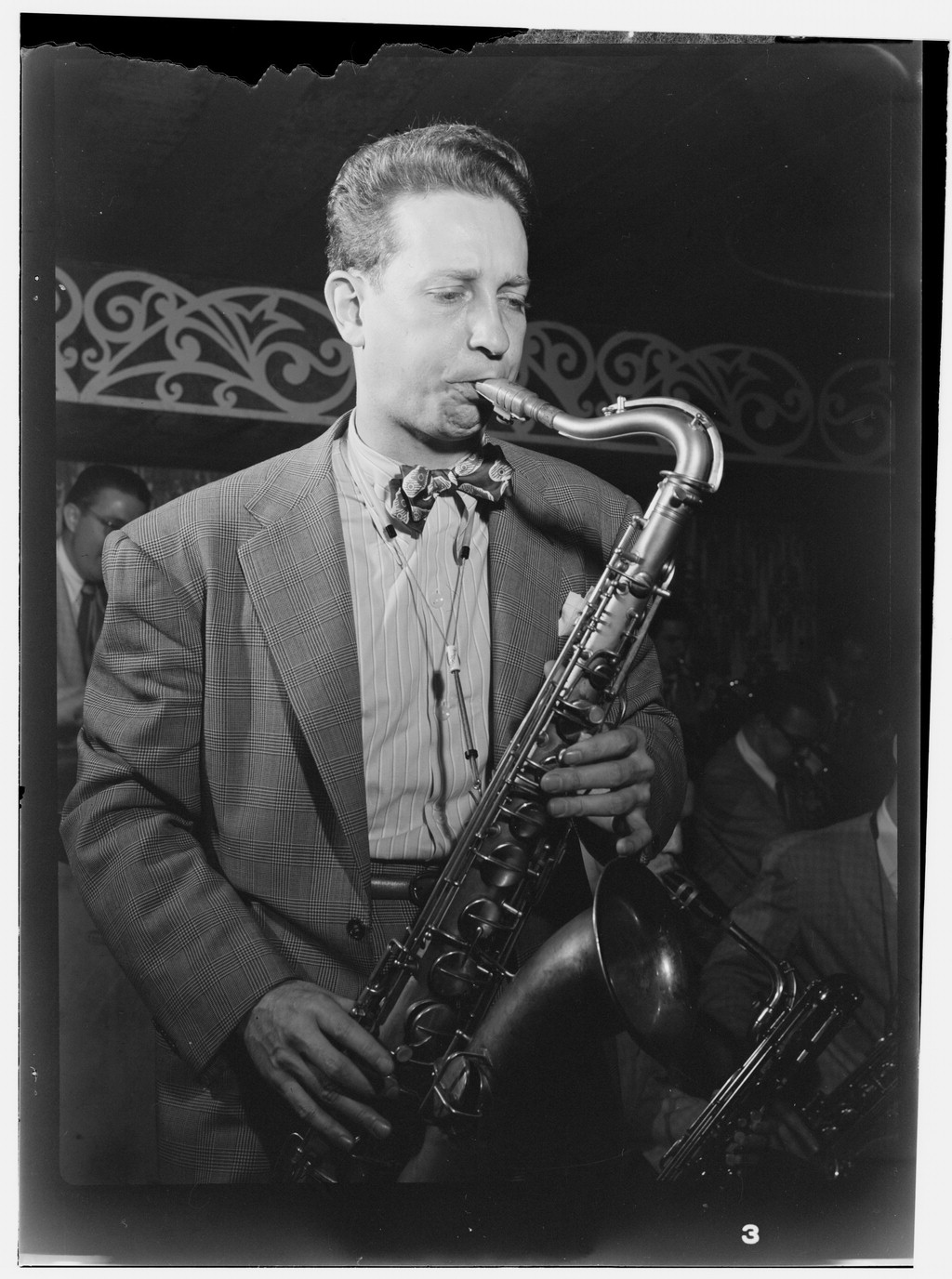
Sam Donahue

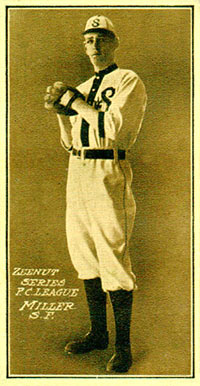
Frank "Bullet" Miller

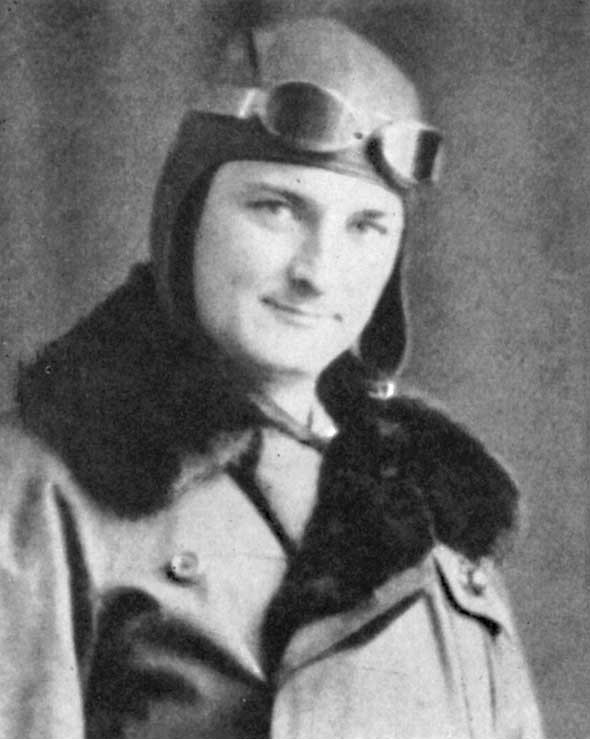
Robert G. Robinson

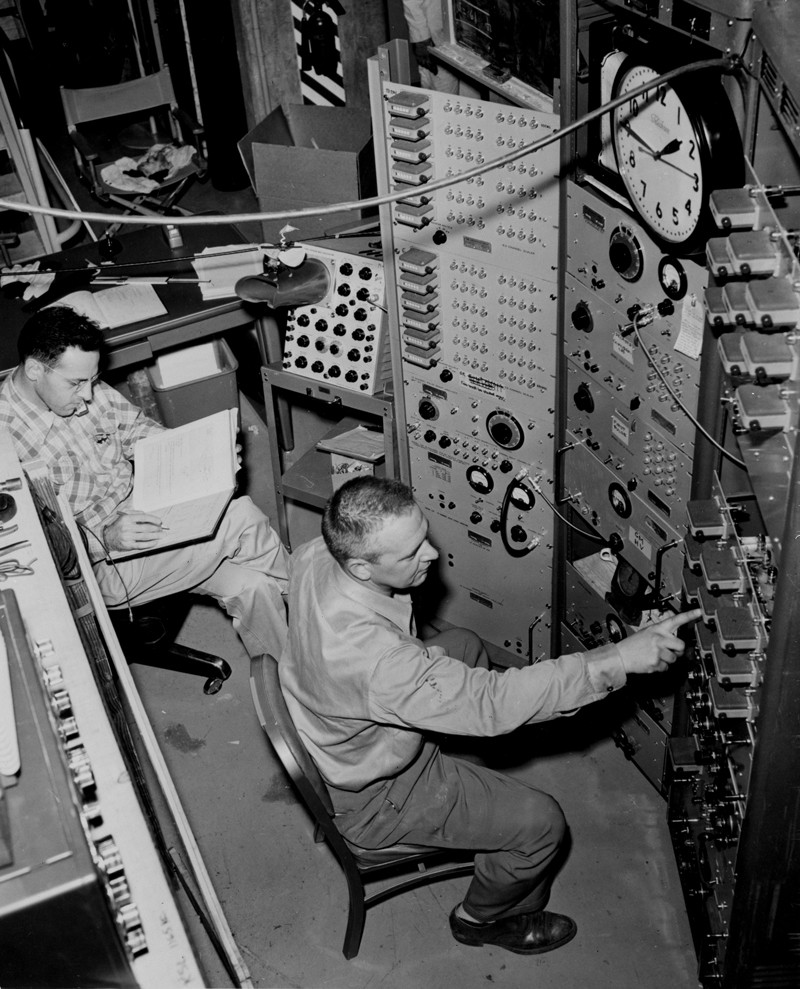
Clyde Cowan

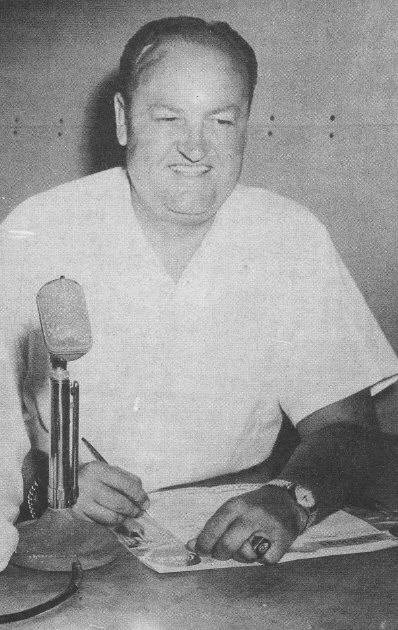
Van Patrick

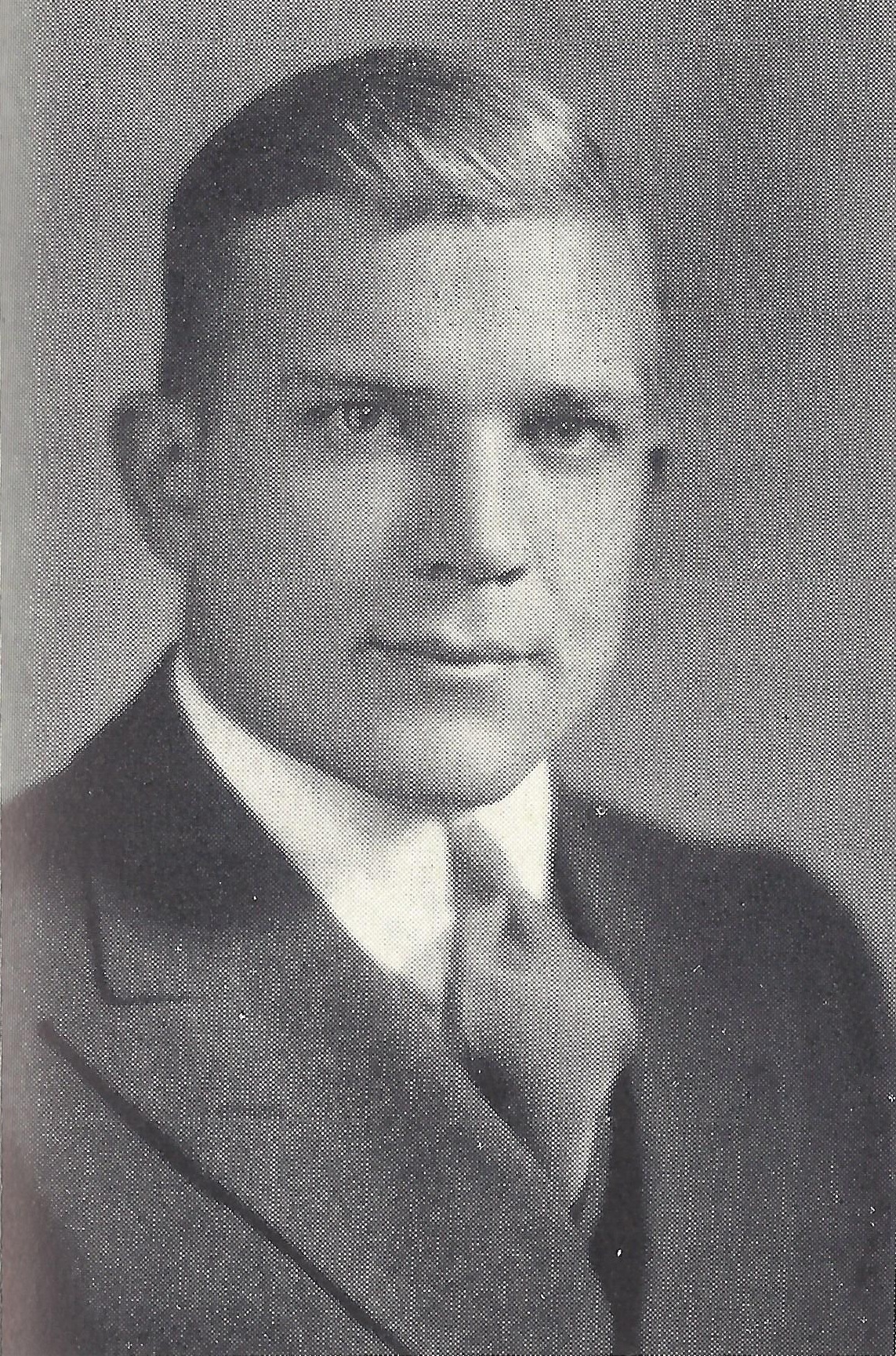
Russell D. Oliver

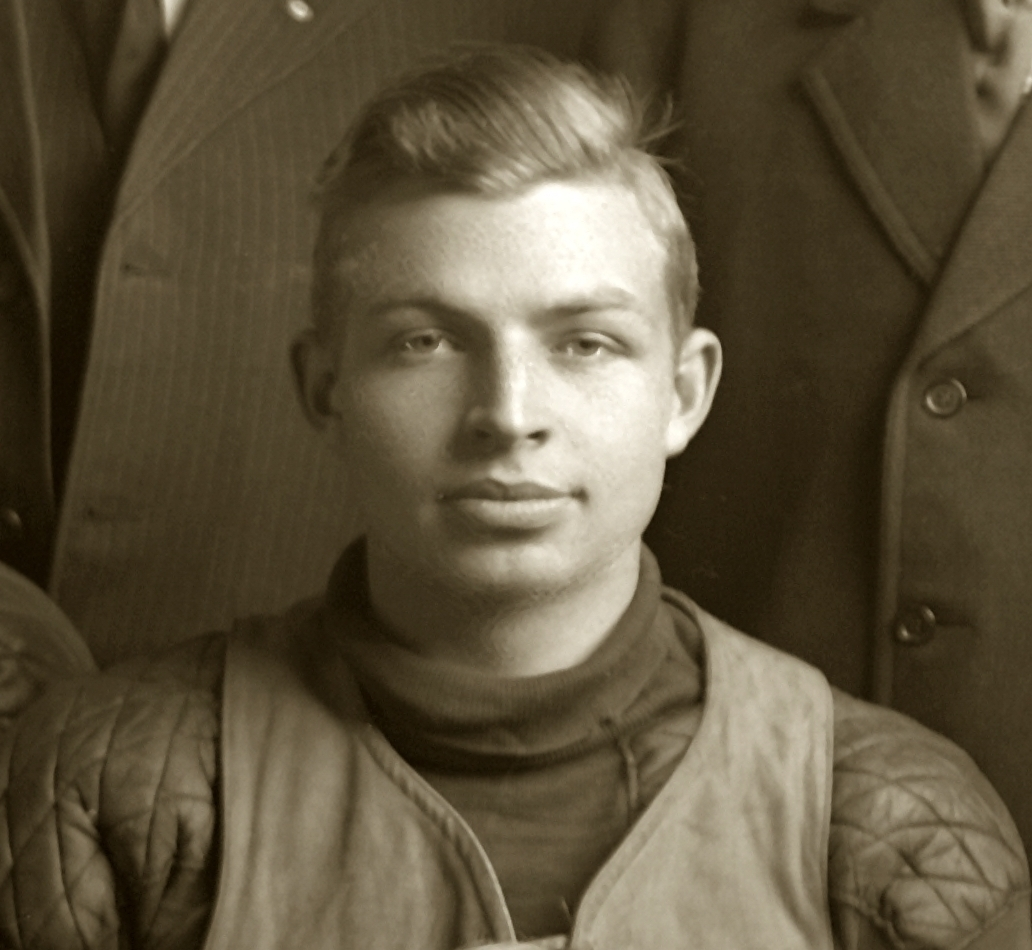
Frederick L. Conklin

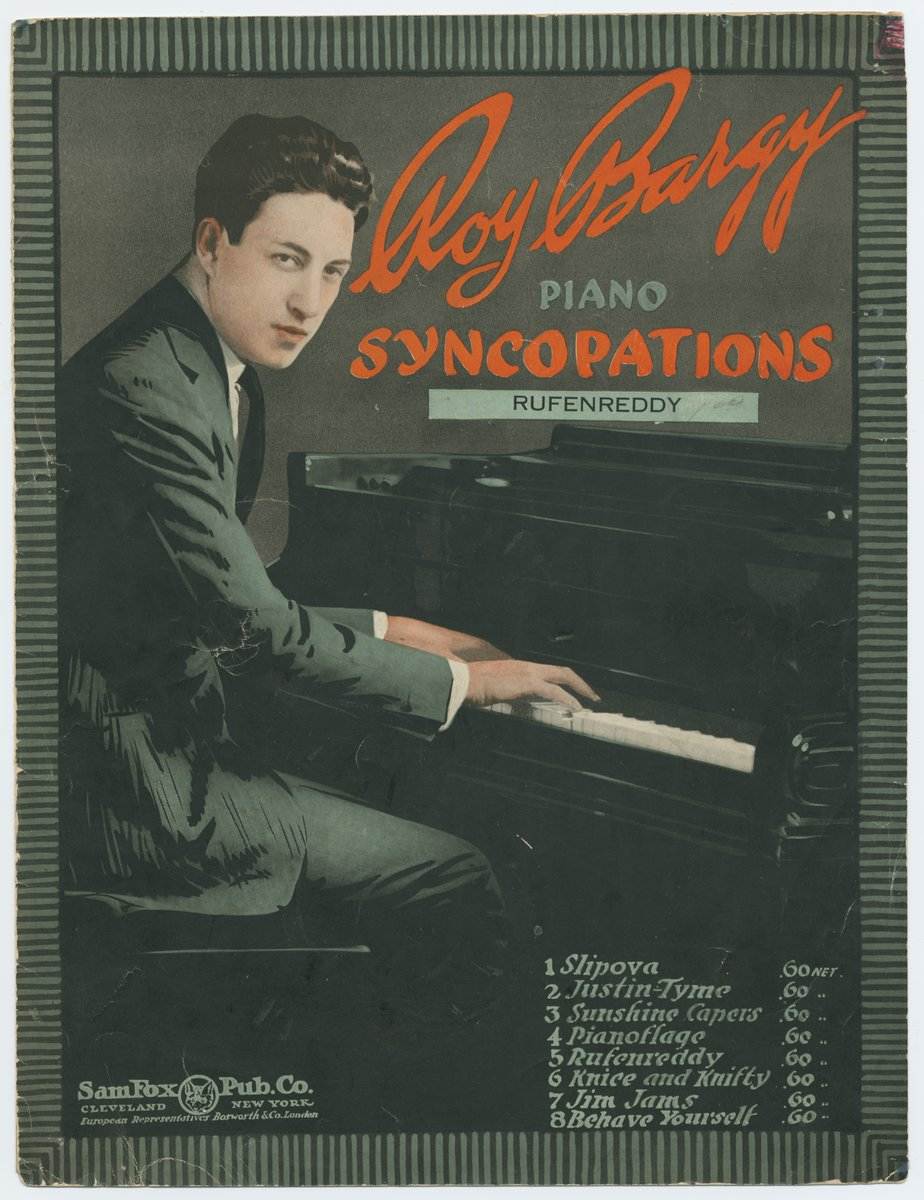
Roy Bargy

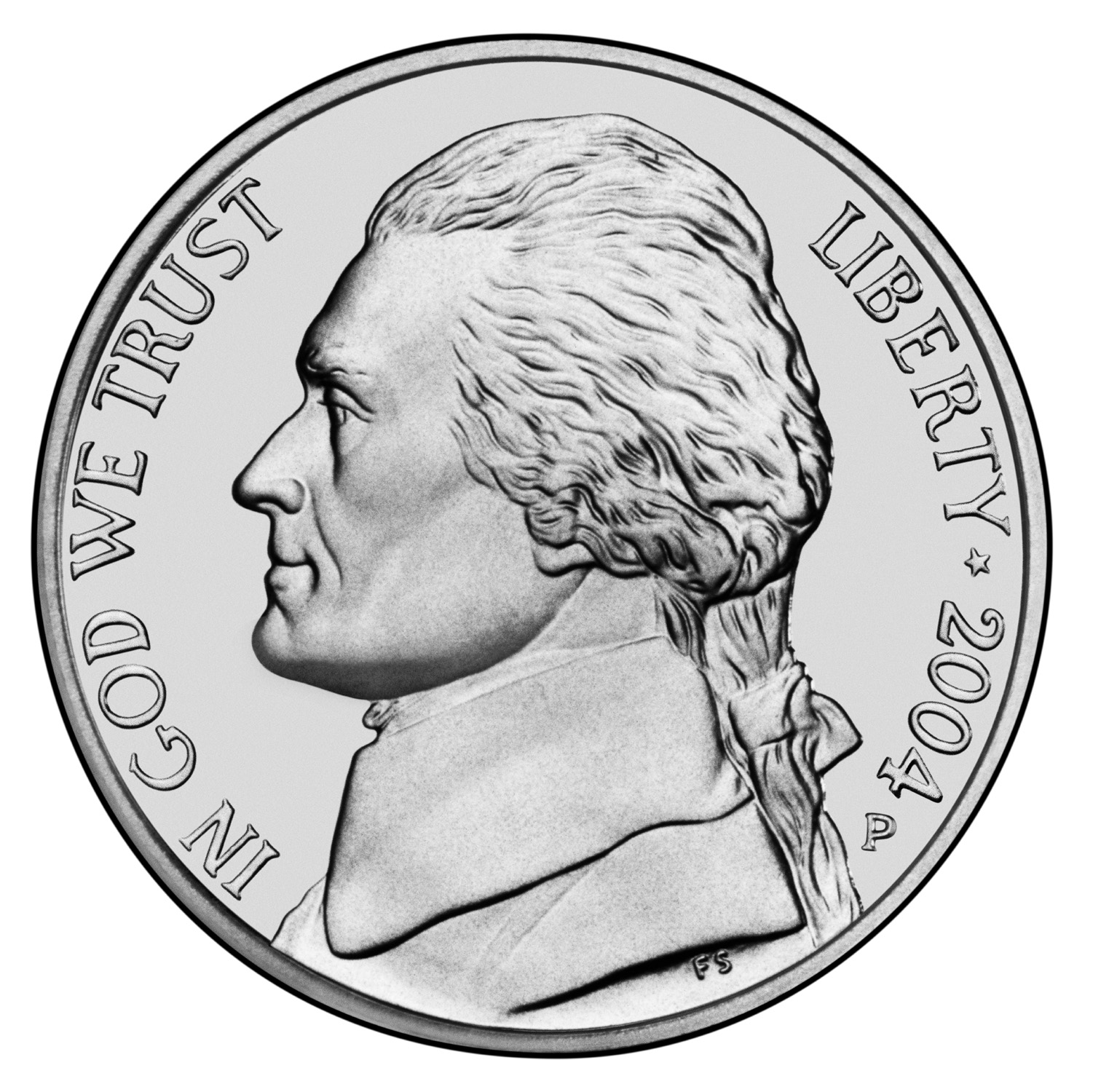
Nickel designed by Felix Schlag
