= 1973–74 NCAA Division I men's basketball season =

Men's collegiate basketball season

- Preseason AP No. 1: UCLA Bruins
- NCAA Tournament: 1974
- Tournament dates: March 9 – 25, 1974
- National Championship: Greensboro Coliseum; Greensboro, North Carolina
- NCAA Champions: NC State Wolfpack
- Helms National Champions: NC State Wolfpack
- Other champions: Purdue Boilermakers (NIT)
- Player of the Year (Naismith, Wooden): Bill Walton, UCLA Bruins (Naismith)
- Player of the Year (Helms): David Thompson, NC State Wolfpack; Bill Walton, UCLA Bruins

The 1973–74 NCAA Division I men's basketball season began in November 1973, progressed through the regular season and conference tournaments, and concluded with the 1974 NCAA Men's Division I Basketball Tournament Championship Game on March 25, 1974, at the Greensboro Coliseum in Greensboro, North Carolina.

The North Carolina State Wolfpack won its first NCAA national championship with a 76–64 victory over the Marquette Warriors.

== Rule changes ==
Holding or grabbing an opposing player away from the ball became fouls, as did illegal screens.

== Season headlines ==
- Prior to the beginning of the season, NCAA Division I replaced the NCAA University Division as the subdivision of the NCAA made up of colleges and universities competing at the highest level of college sports. In addition, NCAA Division II and NCAA Division III replaced the NCAA College Division for colleges and universities competing at a lower level, with Division II consisting of schools awarding limited athletic scholarships and Division III consisting of schools offering no athletic scholarships.
- On August 5, 1973, the NCAA handed down a two-year "death penalty" (i.e., ban on competing) to the University of Southwestern Louisiana (now the University of Louisiana at Lafayette; athletically branded "Louisiana" since the 1999–2000 season) after discovering over 100 rules violations, the most egregious of which were payments to players and falsified high school transcripts. All other Ragin' Cajun teams were placed on four years' probation and banned from competing for national championships during that period. The NCAA also proposed expelling the university from the organization, but that penalty was reduced to forfeiture of voting rights at the annual convention for three years. Additionally, the Ragin' Cajuns' participation in the 1972 and 1973 University Division tournaments was scrubbed from the record books, and the university was required to return all tournament revenue. Southwestern Louisiana became the first university to have a season cancelled by the NCAA since Kentucky in the 1952–53 season.
- In 1973, the first public draw for tickets to the NCAA tournament's Final Four games took place. The tickets were for the 1974 Final Four.
- In the Pacific 8 Conference, UCLA won its eighth of what would ultimately be 13 consecutive conference titles.
- To compete with the National Invitation Tournament, the NCAA created the Collegiate Commissioners Association Tournament as a new postseason tournament which debuted in 1974. Renamed the National Commissioners Invitational Tournament the following season, it lasted only two years.

== Season outlook ==
=== Pre-season polls ===
The top 20 from the AP Poll and UPI Coaches Poll during the pre-season.

Associated Press
Ranking	Team
1	UCLA
2	NC State
3	Indiana
4	Maryland
5	North Carolina
6	Providence
7	Marquette
8	Notre Dame
9	Louisville
10	Kentucky
11	San Francisco
12	Long Beach State
13	Kansas
14	Houston
15	Arizona
16	Penn
17	Jacksonville
18	Alabama
19	UNLV
20	Memphis State

UPI Coaches
Ranking	Team
1	UCLA
2	NC State
3	Indiana
4	North Carolina
5	Maryland
6	Marquette
7	Notre Dame
8	Providence
9	Memphis State
10	Louisville
11	Alabama
12	Long Beach State
13	South Carolina
14	Kansas State
15	Cincinnati
16	New Mexico
17 (tie)	Penn
17 (tie)	Arizona
19	USC
20	Vanderbilt

== Conference membership changes ==
School	Former conference	New conference
Abilene Christian Wildcats	Southland Conference	Lone Star Conference (NAIA)
Buffalo Bulls	non-Division I	Division I independent
Eastern Michigan Eagles	non-Division I	Division I independent
Georgia State Panthers	non-Division I	Division I independent
Houston Baptist Huskies	non-Division I	Division I independent
Memphis State Tigers	Missouri Valley Conference	Division I independent
Mercer Bears	non-Division I	Division I independent
Milwaukee Panthers	non-Division I	Division I independent
Northeast Louisiana Indians	non-Division I	Division I independent
South Florida Bulls	non-Division I	Division I independent
Trinity Tigers	University Division independent	non-Division I
VCU Rams	non-Division I	Division I independent

== Regular season ==
=== Conferences ===
==== Conference winners and tournaments ====
Conference	Regular season winner	Conference player of the year	Conference tournament	Tournament venue (City)	Tournament winner
Atlantic Coast Conference	NC State	David Thompson, NC State	1974 ACC men's basketball tournament	Greensboro Coliseum (Greensboro, North Carolina)	NC State
Big Eight Conference	Kansas	Lon Kruger, Kansas State	No Tournament		
Big Sky Conference	Idaho State & Montana	None selected	No Tournament		
Big Ten Conference	Indiana & Michigan	None selected	No Tournament		
Ivy League	Penn	None selected	No Tournament		
Mid-American Conference	Ohio	Walter Luckett, Ohio	No Tournament		
Middle Atlantic Conference	La Salle & Saint Joseph's (East); Rider (West)	Bill Taylor, La Salle, & Earl Brown, Lafayette	No Tournament		
Missouri Valley Conference	Louisville	Junior Bridgeman, Louisville	No Tournament		
Ohio Valley Conference	Austin Peay & Morehead State	Fly Williams, Austin Peay	No Tournament		
Pacific 8 Conference	UCLA	None selected	No Tournament		
Pacific Coast Athletic Association	Long Beach State	Leonard Gray, Long Beach State	No Tournament		
Southeastern Conference	Alabama & Vanderbilt	Jan van Breda Kolff, Vanderbilt	No Tournament		
Southern Conference	Furman	Clyde Mayes, Furman	1974 Southern Conference men's basketball tournament	Richmond Coliseum (Richmond, Virginia) (Semifinals and Finals)	Furman
Southland Conference	Arkansas State	Steve Brooks, Arkansas State	No Tournament		
Southwest Conference	Texas	Larry Robinson, Texas	No Tournament		
West Coast Athletic Conference	San Francisco	Frank Oleynick, Seattle	No Tournament		
Western Athletic Conference	New Mexico	None selected	No Tournament		
Yankee Conference	Massachusetts	None selected	No Tournament		

==== Conference standings ====
1973–74 ACC men's basketball standings
	Conf.				Overall
Team	W		L	PCT	W		L	PCT
No. 1 NC State †	12	–	0	1.000	30	–	1	.968
No. 4 Maryland	9	–	3	.750	23	–	5	.821
No. 12 North Carolina	9	–	3	.750	22	–	6	.786
Virginia	4	–	8	.333	11	–	16	.407
Clemson	3	–	9	.250	14	–	12	.538
Wake Forest	3	–	9	.250	13	–	13	.500
Duke	2	–	10	.167	10	–	16	.385
† 1974 ACC tournament winner Rankings from AP Poll

1973–74 Big Eight Conference men's basketball standings
	Conf.				Overall
Team	W		L	PCT	W		L	PCT
No. 7 Kansas	13	–	1	.929	23	–	7	.767
Kansas State	11	–	3	.786	19	–	8	.704
Oklahoma	9	–	5	.643	18	–	8	.692
Nebraska	7	–	7	.500	14	–	12	.538
Iowa State	6	–	8	.429	15	–	11	.577
Colorado	4	–	10	.286	9	–	17	.346
Missouri	3	–	11	.214	12	–	14	.462
Oklahoma State	3	–	11	.214	9	–	17	.346
Rankings from AP Poll

1973–74 Big Sky men's basketball standings
	Conf.				Overall
Team	W		L	PCT	W		L	PCT
Idaho State †	11	–	3	.786	20	–	8	.714
Montana	11	–	3	.786	19	–	8	.704
Weber State	8	–	6	.571	14	–	12	.538
Gonzaga	7	–	7	.500	13	–	13	.500
Boise State	6	–	8	.429	12	–	14	.462
Idaho	5	–	9	.357	12	–	14	.462
Montana State	5	–	9	.357	11	–	15	.423
Northern Arizona	3	–	11	.214	3	–	18	.143
† One-game playoff winner

1973–74 Big Ten Conference men's basketball standings
	Conf.				Overall
Team	W		L	PCT	W		L	PCT
No. 9 Indiana	12	–	2	.857	23	–	5	.821
No. 6 Michigan	12	–	2	.857	22	–	5	.815
No. 11 Purdue	10	–	4	.714	21	–	9	.700
Wisconsin	8	–	6	.571	16	–	8	.667
Michigan State	8	–	6	.571	13	–	11	.542
Minnesota	6	–	8	.429	12	–	12	.500
Iowa	5	–	9	.357	8	–	16	.333
Ohio State	4	–	10	.286	9	–	15	.375
Northwestern	3	–	11	.214	9	–	15	.375
Illinois	2	–	12	.143	5	–	18	.217
Rankings from AP Poll

1973–74 Ivy League men's basketball standings
	Conf.				Overall
Team	W		L	PCT	W		L	PCT
Pennsylvania	13	–	1	.929	21	–	6	.778
Brown	11	–	3	.786	17	–	9	.654
Princeton	11	–	3	.786	16	–	10	.615
Harvard	9	–	5	.643	11	–	13	.458
Yale	5	–	9	.357	8	–	16	.333
Columbia	4	–	10	.286	5	–	20	.200
Dartmouth	2	–	12	.143	4	–	22	.154
Cornell	1	–	13	.071	3	–	23	.115
Rankings from AP Poll

1973–74 Mid-American Conference men's basketball standings
	Conf.				Overall
Team	W		L	PCT	W		L	PCT
Ohio	9	–	3	.750	16	–	11	.593
Toledo	8	–	4	.667	19	–	9	.679
Bowling Green State	7	–	5	.583	15	–	11	.577
Central Michigan	6	–	6	.500	14	–	12	.538
Miami (Ohio)	6	–	6	.500	13	–	13	.500
Western Michigan	5	–	7	.417	13	–	13	.500
Kent State	1	–	11	.083	9	–	17	.346
Rankings from AP Poll

1973–74 MAC men's basketball standings
	Conf.				Overall
Team	W		L	PCT	W		L	PCT
University–Eastern
Saint Joseph's †	5	–	1	.833	19	–	10	.655
La Salle	5	–	1	.833	18	–	10	.643
American	4	–	2	.667	16	–	10	.615
Temple	4	–	2	.667	16	–	9	.640
Drexel	2	–	4	.333	15	–	9	.625
Hofstra	1	–	5	.167	8	–	16	.333
West Chester	0	–	6	.000	11	–	15	.423
University–Western
Rider	8	–	2	.800	13	–	13	.500
Lafayette	7	–	3	.700	17	–	9	.654
Delaware	7	–	3	.700	15	–	11	.577
Gettysburg	4	–	6	.400	15	–	10	.600
Bucknell	2	–	8	.200	8	–	16	.333
Lehigh	2	–	8	.200	3	–	21	.125
† 1974 MAC men's basketball tournament winner Rankings from AP Poll

1973–74 Missouri Valley Conference men's basketball standings
	Conf.				Overall
Team	W		L	PCT	W		L	PCT
Louisville	11	–	1	.917	21	–	7	.750
Bradley	9	–	3	.750	20	–	8	.714
Tulsa	7	–	6	.538	18	–	8	.692
New Mexico State	7	–	6	.538	14	–	11	.560
Wichita State	6	–	7	.462	11	–	15	.423
West Texas State	5	–	8	.385	11	–	15	.423
North Texas State	4	–	8	.333	13	–	13	.500
Saint Louis	4	–	8	.333	9	–	16	.360
Drake	3	–	9	.250	13	–	13	.500
Rankings from AP Poll

1973–74 Ohio Valley Conference men's basketball standings
	Conf.				Overall
Team	W		L	PCT	W		L	PCT
Morehead State	10	–	4	.714	17	–	9	.654
Austin Peay State	10	–	4	.714	17	–	10	.630
Middle Tennessee	9	–	5	.643	18	–	8	.692
Western Kentucky	8	–	6	.571	15	–	10	.600
Murray State	6	–	8	.429	12	–	13	.480
Eastern Kentucky	6	–	8	.429	8	–	15	.348
Tennessee Tech	4	–	10	.286	7	–	18	.280
East Tennessee State	3	–	11	.214	8	–	18	.308
Rankings from AP Poll

1973–74 Pacific-8 Conference men's basketball standings
	Conf.				Overall
Team	W		L	PCT	W		L	PCT
No. 2 UCLA	12	–	2	.857	26	–	4	.867
USC	11	–	3	.786	24	–	5	.828
Oregon	9	–	5	.643	15	–	11	.577
Washington	7	–	7	.500	16	–	10	.615
Oregon State	6	–	8	.429	13	–	13	.500
Stanford	5	–	9	.357	11	–	14	.440
California	3	–	11	.214	9	–	17	.346
Washington State	3	–	11	.214	8	–	21	.276
Rankings from AP Poll

1973–74 Pacific Coast Athletic Association men's basketball standings
	Conf.				Overall
Team	W		L	PCT	W		L	PCT
No. 10 Long Beach State	12	–	0	1.000	24	–	2	.923
Cal State Los Angeles	8	–	4	.667	17	–	10	.630
UC Santa Barbara	7	–	5	.583	16	–	10	.615
Fresno State	5	–	7	.417	16	–	9	.640
Pacific	4	–	8	.333	14	–	12	.538
San Diego State	4	–	8	.333	7	–	19	.269
San Jose State	2	–	10	.167	11	–	15	.423
Rankings from AP Poll

1973–74 Southeastern Conference men's basketball standings
	Conf.				Overall
Team	W		L	PCT	W		L	PCT
No. 14 Alabama	15	–	3	.833	22	–	4	.846
No. 13 Vanderbilt	15	–	3	.833	23	–	5	.821
Tennessee	12	–	6	.667	17	–	9	.654
Ole Miss	9	–	9	.500	15	–	10	.600
Florida	9	–	9	.500	15	–	11	.577
Kentucky	9	–	9	.500	13	–	13	.500
Mississippi State	8	–	10	.444	16	–	10	.615
LSU	6	–	12	.333	12	–	14	.462
Auburn	5	–	13	.278	10	–	16	.385
Georgia	2	–	16	.111	6	–	20	.231
Rankings from AP Poll

1973–74 Southern Conference men's basketball standings
	Conf.				Overall
Team	W		L	PCT	W		L	PCT
Furman †	11	–	1	.917	22	–	9	.710
Richmond	10	–	4	.714	16	–	12	.571
Davidson	7	–	3	.700	18	–	9	.667
East Carolina	8	–	6	.571	13	–	12	.520
William & Mary	5	–	6	.455	9	–	18	.333
The Citadel	4	–	9	.308	10	–	14	.417
VMI	3	–	9	.250	6	–	18	.250
Appalachian State	1	–	11	.083	5	–	20	.200
† Southern Conference Tournament winner Rankings from AP Poll

1973–74 Southland Conference men's basketball standings
	Conf.				Overall
Team	W		L	PCT	W		L	PCT
Arkansas State†	4	–	0	1.000	17	–	8	.680
Texas-Arlington	2	–	2	.500	7	–	18	.280
Lamar	0	–	4	.000	6	–	19	.240
McNeese State	0	–	0	–	20	–	5	.800
Louisiana Tech	0	–	0	–	8	–	13	.381
Southwestern Louisiana*		–		–	0	–	0	–
† Regular-season championship winner * – Served first season of NCAA two-season ban on competing. Rankings from AP Poll

1973–74 Southwest Conference men's basketball standings
	Conf.				Overall
Team	W		L	PCT	W		L	PCT
Texas	11	–	3	.786	12	–	15	.444
Texas Tech	10	–	4	.714	17	–	9	.654
SMU	10	–	4	.714	15	–	12	.556
Texas A&M	7	–	7	.500	15	–	11	.577
Arkansas	6	–	8	.429	10	–	16	.385
Baylor	5	–	9	.357	12	–	13	.480
Rice	5	–	9	.357	11	–	17	.393
TCU	2	–	12	.143	8	–	17	.320
Rankings from AP Poll

1973–74 West Coast Athletic Conference men's basketball standings
	Conf.				Overall
Team	W		L	PCT	W		L	PCT
San Francisco	12	–	2	.857	19	–	9	.679
Seattle	11	–	3	.786	15	–	11	.577
UNLV	10	–	4	.714	20	–	6	.769
Loyola Marymount	6	–	8	.429	13	–	14	.481
Saint Mary's	5	–	9	.357	15	–	13	.536
Nevada	4	–	10	.286	11	–	15	.423
Pepperdine	4	–	10	.286	8	–	18	.308
Santa Clara	4	–	10	.286	8	–	19	.296
Rankings from AP Poll

1973–74 WAC men's basketball standings
	Conf.				Overall
Team	W		L	PCT	W		L	PCT
New Mexico	10	–	4	.714	22	–	7	.759
No. 15 Utah	9	–	5	.643	22	–	8	.733
Arizona	9	–	5	.643	19	–	7	.731
Arizona State	9	–	5	.643	18	–	9	.667
UTEP	8	–	6	.571	18	–	7	.720
BYU	6	–	8	.429	11	–	15	.423
Colorado State	5	–	9	.357	12	–	14	.462
Wyoming	0	–	14	.000	4	–	22	.154
Rankings from AP Poll

1973–74 Yankee Conference men's basketball standings
	Conf.				Overall
Team	W		L	PCT	W		L	PCT
Massachusetts	11	–	1	.917	21	–	5	.808
Connecticut	9	–	3	.750	19	–	8	.704
New Hampshire	8	–	4	.667	16	–	9	.640
Rhode Island	6	–	5	.545	11	–	14	.440
Vermont	3	–	9	.250	9	–	17	.346
Boston University	2	–	9	.182	9	–	16	.360
Maine	2	–	10	.167	14	–	10	.583

=== Division I independents ===
A total of 81 college teams played as Division I independents. Among them, Notre Dame (26–3) had the best winning percentage (.897) and Providence (28–4) finished with the most wins.

1973–74 NCAA Division I men's basketball independents standings
	Conf.				Overall
Team	W		L	PCT	W		L	PCT
No. 5 Notre Dame		–		–	26	–	3	.897
No. 8 Providence		–		–	28	–	4	.875
No. 16 Pittsburgh		–		–	25	–	4	.862
UNC Charlotte		–		–	22	–	4	.846
Centenary		–		–	21	–	4	.840
Marquette		–		–	26	–	5	.839
No. 19 South Carolina		–		–	22	–	5	.815
No. 18 Oral Roberts		–		–	23	–	6	.793
South Alabama		–		–	22	–	6	.786
Creighton		–		–	23	–	7	.767
St. John's		–		–	20	–	7	.741
Georgia Southern		–		–	19	–	7	.731
Southern Illinois		–		–	19	–	7	.731
Syracuse		–		–	19	–	7	.731
VCU		–		–	17	–	7	.708
Cincinnati		–		–	19	–	8	.704
Boston College		–		–	21	–	9	.700
Florida State		–		–	18	–	8	.692
Rutgers		–		–	18	–	8	.692
No. 20 Dayton		–		–	20	–	9	.690
Hawaii		–		–	19	–	9	.679
Jacksonville		–		–	20	–	10	.667
Manhattan		–		–	18	–	9	.667
Mercer		–		–	16	–	8	.667
Detroit		–		–	17	–	9	.654
Fairfield		–		–	17	–	9	.654
Houston		–		–	17	–	9	.654
Illinois State		–		–	17	–	9	.654
Marshall		–		–	17	–	9	.654
St. Bonaventure		–		–	17	–	9	.654
Stetson		–		–	17	–	9	.654
DePaul		–		–	16	–	9	.640
Memphis State		–		–	19	–	11	.633
Northeast Louisiana		–		–	16	–	10	.615
Utah State		–		–	16	–	10	.615
Colgate		–		–	15	–	10	.600
Portland State		–		–	16	–	11	.593
Seton Hall		–		–	16	–	11	.593
Pan American		–		–	13	–	9	.591
George Washington		–		–	15	–	11	.577
Portland		–		–	15	–	11	.577
Saint Francis (PA)		–		–	15	–	11	.577
Ball State		–		–	14	–	12	.538
Butler		–		–	14	–	12	.538
Canisius		–		–	14	–	12	.538
Milwaukee		–		–	14	–	12	.538
Penn State		–		–	14	–	12	.538
Northeastern		–		–	12	–	11	.522
Long Island		–		–	13	–	12	.520
Duquesne		–		–	12	–	12	.500
Georgetown		–		–	13	–	13	.500
Oklahoma City		–		–	13	–	13	.500
Virginia Tech		–		–	13	–	13	.500
Indiana State		–		–	12	–	14	.462
Loyola Chicago		–		–	12	–	14	.462
Niagara		–		–	12	–	14	.462
Tulane		–		–	12	–	14	.462
Air Force		–		–	11	–	13	.458
Iona		–		–	11	–	13	.458
St. Francis (NY)		–		–	11	–	13	.458
Fairleigh Dickinson		–		–	11	–	14	.440
Hardin-Simmons		–		–	11	–	14	.440
South Florida		–		–	11	–	14	.440
Denver		–		–	11	–	15	.423
Southern Mississippi		–		–	11	–	15	.423
Navy		–		–	9	–	13	.409
West Virginia		–		–	10	–	15	.400
Fordham		–		–	8	–	17	.320
Northern Illinois		–		–	8	–	17	.320
Eastern Michigan		–		–	8	–	18	.308
Holy Cross		–		–	8	–	18	.308
Saint Peter's		–		–	8	–	18	.308
Xavier		–		–	8	–	18	.308
Villanova		–		–	7	–	19	.269
Army		–		–	6	–	18	.250
Houston Baptist		–		–	6	–	19	.240
Cleveland State		–		–	6	–	20	.231
Samford		–		–	6	–	20	.231
Buffalo		–		–	5	–	20	.200
Georgia Tech		–		–	5	–	21	.192
Georgia State		–		–	1	–	25	.038
Rankings from AP Poll

=== Informal championships ===
Conference	Regular season winner	Most Valuable Player
Philadelphia Big 5	Penn	Ron Haigler, Penn

Penn finished with a 4–0 record in head-to-head competition among the Philadelphia Big 5.

== Post-season tournaments ==
=== NCAA tournament ===
==== Final Four ====
National semifinals
E	NC State	80
W	UCLA	77
ME	Marquette	64
MW	Kansas	51

National finals
E	NC State	76
ME	Marquette	64
Third place
W	UCLA	78
MW	Kansas	61

=== National Invitation Tournament ===
==== Semifinals & finals ====
Semifinals
Jacksonville	64
Purdue	78
Utah	117
Boston College	93

Finals
Purdue	87
Utah	81
Third place
Jacksonville	77
Boston College	87

=== Collegiate Commissioners Association Tournament ===
The Collegiate Commissioners Association Tournament debuted this season as a new postseason tournament created by the NCAA to compete with the NIT. It was renamed the National Commissioners Invitational Tournament the following year.

==== Semifinals & final ====
Semifinals
Indiana	73
Toledo	72
Bradley	73
USC	76

Final
Indiana	85
USC	60

== Awards ==
=== Consensus All-American teams ===
Consensus First Team
Player	Position	Class	Team
Marvin Barnes	C	Senior	Providence
John Shumate	F	Junior	Notre Dame
David Thompson	G/F	Junior	North Carolina State
Bill Walton	C	Senior	UCLA
Keith Wilkes	G/F	Senior	UCLA

Consensus Second Team
Player	Position	Class	Team
Len Elmore	C	Junior	Maryland
Larry Fogle	G	Sophomore	Canisius
Bobby Jones	F	Senior	North Carolina
Billy Knight	G/F	Senior	Pittsburgh
Campy Russell	F	Junior	Michigan

=== Major player of the year awards ===
- Naismith Award: Bill Walton, UCLA
- Helms Player of the Year: David Thompson, NC State & Bill Walton, UCLA
- Associated Press Player of the Year: David Thompson, NC State
- UPI Player of the Year: Bill Walton, UCLA
- Oscar Robertson Trophy (USBWA): Bill Walton, UCLA
- Adolph Rupp Trophy: Bill Walton, UCLA
- Sporting News Player of the Year: Bill Walton, UCLA

=== Major coach of the year awards ===
- Associated Press Coach of the Year: Norm Sloan, NC State
- Henry Iba Award (USBWA): Norm Sloan, NC State
- NABC Coach of the Year: Al McGuire, Marquette
- UPI Coach of the Year: Digger Phelps, Notre Dame
- Sporting News Coach of the Year: Digger Phelps, Notre Dame

=== Other major awards ===
- Frances Pomeroy Naismith Award (Best player under 6'0): Mike Robinson, Michigan State
- Robert V. Geasey Trophy (Top player in Philadelphia Big 5): Ron Haigler, Penn
- NIT/Haggerty Award (Top player in New York City metro area): Bill Campion, Manhattan

== Coaching changes ==
A number of teams changed coaches during the season and after it ended.

Team	Former Coach	Interim Coach	New Coach	Reason
Arkansas	Lanny Van Eman		Eddie Sutton	
Boston University	Ron Mitchell		Roy Sigler	
Canisius	John Morrison		Johnny McCarthy	
The Citadel	George Hill		Les Robinson	
Cornell	Tony Coma	Tom Allen	Ben Bluitt	
Creighton	Eddie Sutton		Tom Apke	Sutton left to coach Arkansas.
Dartmouth	Tom O'Connor		Marcus Jackson	O'Connor left to coach Loyola.
Davidson	Terry Holland		Robert Brickels	Holland left to coach Virginia.
Drake	Howard Stacey		Bob Ortegel	
Duke	Neill McGeachy		Bill Foster	
Duquesne	Red Manning		John Cinicola	Cinicola was an assistant under Manning 1960-74.
East Carolina	Tom Quinn		Dave Patton	
George Washington	Carl Slone		Bob Tallent	Slone left to coach Richmond.
Georgia Southern	J. E. Rowe		Larry Chapman	
Idaho	Wayne D. Anderson		Jim Jarvis	
Illinois	Harv Schmidt		Gene Bartow	
Iowa	Dick Schultz		Lute Olson	
Iowa State	Maury John		Ken Trickey	John coached the first five games of the 1973-74 season, but sat out the rest of the season after his cancer diagnosis. Assistant coach Gus Guydon finished the remaining 21 games. John resigned before the start of the 1974-75 season and passed away October 15, 1974.
Kent State	Frank Truitt		Rex Hughes	
Long Beach State	Lute Olson		Dwight Jones	Olson left to coach Iowa.
Louisiana Tech	Scotty Robertson		Emmett Hendricks	Robertson left to coach in the NBA for the New Orleans Jazz.
Loyola	Nap Doherty		Tom O'Connor	
Memphis State	Gene Bartow		Wayne Yates	Bartow left to coach Illinois. Yates was an assistant under Bartow.
Mercer	Joe Dan Gold		Bill Bibb	
Montana State	Hank Anderson		Rich Juarez	Anderson left to be the athletic director of Northern Arizona.
Morehead State	Bill Harrell		Jack Schalow	
Murray State	Cal Luther		Fred Overton	Luther stayed with Murray State to be the athletic director. Overton was an assistant under Luther from 1971-74.
Northern Arizona	Herb Gregg		John Birkett	
Ohio	Jim Snyder		Dale Bandy	
Oral Roberts	Ken Trickey		Jerry Hale	Trickey left to coach Iowa State.
Rice	Don Knodel		Bob Polk	
Richmond	Lewis Mills		Carl Slone	
Saint Joseph's	Jack McKinney		Harry Booth	
Saint Louis	Bob Polk		Randy Albrecht	
Saint Peter's	Bernie Ockene		Dick McDonald	
San Diego State	Dick Davis		Tim Vezie	
South Florida	Don Williams		Bill Gibson	
Utah	Bill Foster		Jerry Pimm	Foster left to coach Duke.
Virginia	Bill Gibson		Terry Holland	Gibson left to coach South Florida.
Weber State	Gene Visscher		Neil McCarthy	
West Virginia	Sonny Moran		Joedy Gardner	Moran left to be an athletic director for Morehead State.
