= List of Cornell Big Red men's basketball head coaches =

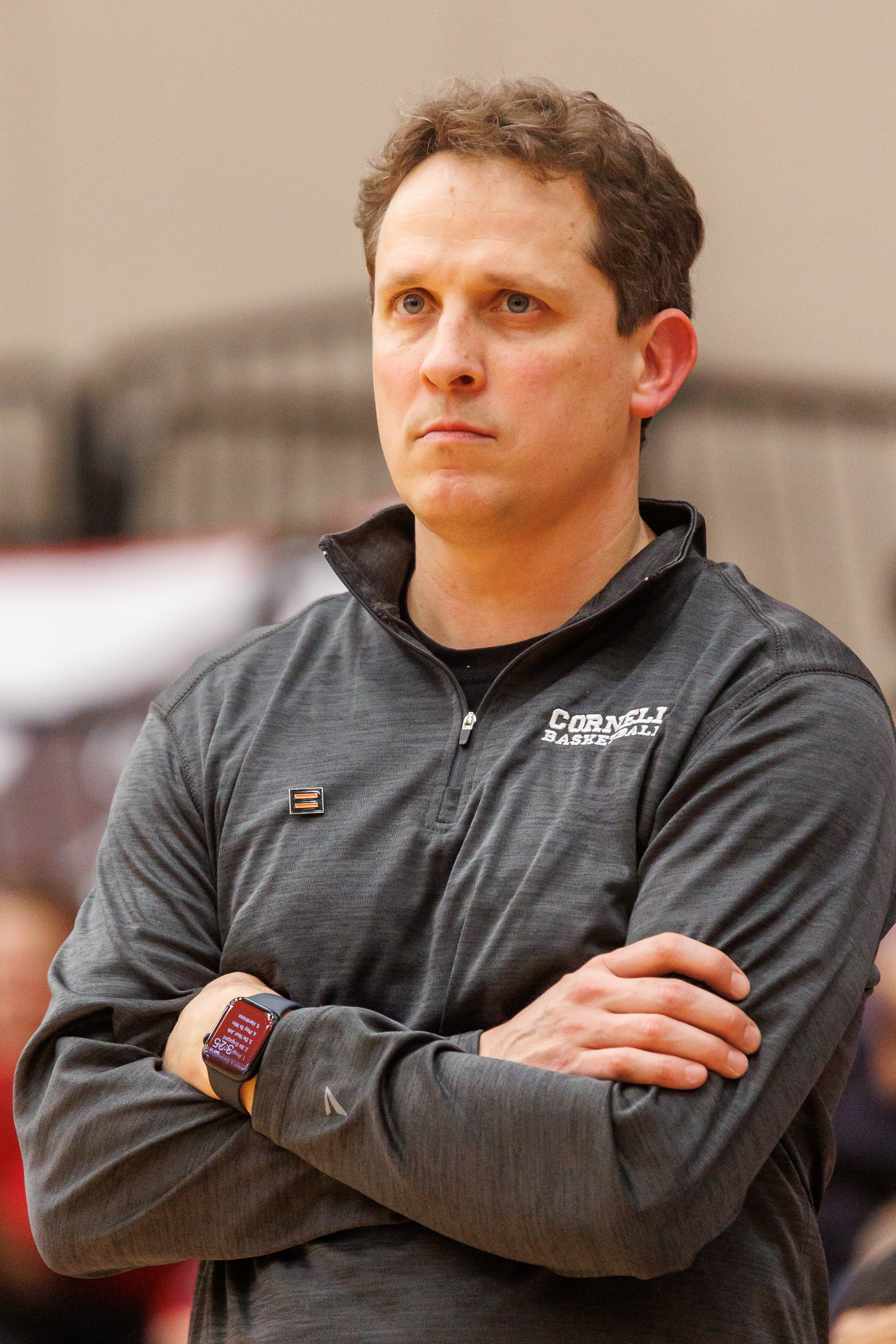
Brian Earl, head coach from 2016 to 2024

The following is a list of Cornell Big Red men's basketball head coaches. There have been 22 head coaches of the Big Red in their 124-season history.

Brian Earl was hired as the Big Red's head coach in April 2016, replacing Bill Courtney, whose contract was not renewed after the 2015–16 season.

Cornell's current head coach is Jon Jaques.

No.	Tenure	Coach	Years	Record	Pct.
–	1898–1907	No coach	9	30–73–2	.295
1	1907–1909	Walter Haggerty	2	18–18	.500
2	1909–1910	David Coogan	1	7–6	.538
3	1910–1912	Paul Sternberg	2	13–13	.500
4	1912–1919	Albert Sharpe	7	78–32	.709
5	1919–1936	Howard Ortner	17	159–157	.503
6	1936–1938	Bo Rowland	2	14–21	.400
7	1938–1942	Blair Gullion	4	48–43	.527
8	1942–1946	Speed Wilson	4	40–36	.526
9	1946–1959	Royner Greene	13	168–145	.537
10	1959–1968	Sam MacNeil	9	139–79	.638
11	1968–1972	Jerry Lace	4	29–69	.296
12	1972–1974 (Note: Coma resigned on February 7, 1974 amidst an investigation into NCAA violations. Allen was named interim coach for the remainder of the season.)	Tony Coma	2	7–36	.163
13	1974*	Tom Allen	1	0–9	.000
14	1974–1980	Ben Bluitt	6	46–107	.301
15	1980–1986	Tom Miller	6	71–85	.455
16	1986–1991	Mike Dement	5	67–67	.500
17	1991–1993	Jan van Breda Kolff	2	23–29	.442
18	1993–1996	Al Walker	3	27–51	.346
19	1996–2000	Scott Thompson	4	45–60	.429
20	2000–2010	Steve Donahue	10	146–138	.514
21	2010–2016	Bill Courtney	6	60–113	.347
22	2016–present (Note: Cornell's 2020–21 season was cancelled due to the COVID-19 pandemic.)	Brian Earl	6	74–85	.465
Totals		22 coaches	124 seasons	1,309–1,482–2	.469
Records updated through end of 2022–23 season * - Denotes interim head coach. Source
