= 1974 National Invitation Tournament =

Annual NCAA college basketball competition

- Season: 1973–74
- Teams: 16
- Finals site: Madison Square Garden, New York City
- Champions: Purdue Boilermakers (1st title)
- Runner-up: Utah Utes (2nd title game)
- Semifinalists: Boston College Eagles (2nd semifinal); Jacksonville Dolphins (2nd semifinal)
- Winning coach: Fred Schaus (1st title)
- MVP: Mike Sojourner (Utah)

The 1974 National Invitation Tournament was the 1974 edition of the annual NCAA college basketball competition.

== Selected teams ==
Below is a list of the 16 teams selected for the tournament.

- Boston College
- Cincinnati
- Connecticut
- Fairfield
- Hawaii
- Jacksonville
- Manhattan
- Maryland Eastern Shore
- Massachusetts
- Memphis
- North Carolina
- Purdue
- Rutgers
- St. John's
- Seton Hall
- Utah

== Bracket ==
Below is the tournament bracket.

First Round
Maryland Eastern Shore	84
Manhattan	81
Jacksonville	73
Massachusetts	69
Hawaii	66
Fairfield	65
Purdue	82
North Carolina	71
Memphis	73
Seton Hall	72
Utah	102
Rutgers	89
Connecticut	82
St. John's	70
Boston College	63
Cincinnati	62

Quarterfinals
Maryland Eastern Shore	83
Jacksonville	85
Hawaii	72
Purdue	85
Memphis	78
Utah	92
Connecticut	75
Boston College	76

Semifinals
Jacksonville	63
Purdue	78
Utah	117
Boston College	93

Finals
Purdue	87
Utah	81

Third place game
Jacksonville	77
Boston College	87

== See also ==
- 1974 NCAA Division I Basketball Tournament
- 1974 NCAA Division II Basketball Tournament
- 1974 NAIA Division I men's basketball tournament
- 1974 National Women's Invitational Tournament
