= List of Kentucky Wildcats men's basketball seasons =

This is a complete list of Kentucky Wildcats men's basketball teams seasons, from their first season in 1903 to present.

== Season-by-season results ==
The following is a list of Kentucky Wildcats men's basketball seasons, with records and notable accomplishments.

Record table
Season	Coach	Overall	Conference	Standing	Postseason
WWH Mustaine (1902–1903)
1902–03	WWH Mustaine	1–2	—	—	—
WWH Mustaine:		1–2	–		
Unnamed (1903–1909)
1903–04	Unnamed	1–4	—	—	—
1904–05	Unnamed	1–4	—	—	—
1905–06	Unnamed	5–9	—	—	—
1906–07	Unnamed	3–6	—	—	—
1907–08	Unnamed	5–6	—	—	—
1908–09	Unnamed	5–4	—	—	—
Unnamed:		20–33	–		
Edwin Sweetland (1909–1910)
1909–10	Edwin Sweetland	4–8	—	—	—
Edwin Sweetland:		4–8	–		
Harold Iddings (Southern Intercollegiate Athletic Association) (1910–1911)
1910–11	Harold Iddings	5–6	—	—	—
Harold Iddings:		5–6	–		
Edwin Sweetland (Southern Intercollegiate Athletic Association) (1911–1912)
1911–12	Edwin Sweetland	9–0	—	—	—
Edwin Sweetland:		9–0 (13–8)	–		
John J. Tigert (Southern Intercollegiate Athletic Association) (1912–1913)
1912–13	Edwin Sweetland	5–3	—	—	—
John J. Tigert:		5–3	–		
Alpha Brumage (Southern Intercollegiate Athletic Association) (1913–1915)
1913–14	Alpha Brumage	12–2	—	—	—
1914–15	Alpha Brumage	7–5	—	—	—
Alpha Brumage:		19–7	–		
James Park (Southern Intercollegiate Athletic Association) (1915–1916)
1915–16	James Park	8–6	—	—	—
James Park:		8–6	–		
William P. Tuttle (Southern Intercollegiate Athletic Association) (1916–1917)
1916–17	William P. Tuttle	4–6	—	—	—
William P. Tuttle:		4–6	–		
Stanley A. Boles (Southern Intercollegiate Athletic Association) (1917–1918)
1917–18	Stanley A. Boles	9–2–1	—	—	—
Stanley A. Boles:		9–2–1	–		
Andrew Gill (Southern Intercollegiate Athletic Association) (1918–1919)
1918–19	Andrew Gill	6–8	—	—	—
Andrew Gill:		6–8	–		
George Buchheit (Southern Intercollegiate Athletic Association) (1919–1921)
1919–20	George Buchheit	5–7	—	—	—
1920–21	George Buchheit	13–1	—	—	—
George Buchheit (Southern Conference) (1921–1924)
1921–22	George Buchheit	10–6	3–1	3rd	—
1922–23	George Buchheit	3–10	0–5	18th	—
1923–24	George Buchheit	13–3	6–2	5th	—
George Buchheit:		44–27	9–8		
Clarence Applegran (Southern Conference) (1924–1925)
1924–25	Clarence Applegran	13–8	6–2	3rd	—
Clarence Applegran:		13–8	6–2		
Ray Eklund (Southern Conference) (1925–1926)
1925–26	Ray Eklund	15–3	8–0	1st	—
Ray Eklund:		15–3	8–0		
Basil Hayden (Southern Conference) (1926–1927)
1926–27	Basil Hayden	3–13	1–6	18th	—
Basil Hayden:		3–13	1–6		
John Mauer (Southern Conference) (1927–1929)
1927–28	John Mauer	12–6	8–1	3rd	—
1928–29	John Mauer	12–5	7–4	6th	—
1929–30	John Mauer	16–3	9–1	3rd	—
John Mauer:		40–14	24–6		
Adolph Rupp (Southern Conference) (1930–1932)
1930–31	Adolph Rupp	15–3	8–2	4th	—
1931–32	Adolph Rupp	15–2	9–1	1st	—
Adolph Rupp (Southeastern Conference) (1932–1972)
1932–33	Adolph Rupp	21–3	8–0	1st	Helms National Champion
1933–34	Adolph Rupp	16–1	11–0	1st	
1934–35	Adolph Rupp	19–2	11–0	1st	
1935–36	Adolph Rupp	15–6	6–2	2nd	
1936–37	Adolph Rupp	17–5	5–3	1st	
1937–38	Adolph Rupp	13–5	6–0	2nd	
1938–39	Adolph Rupp	16–4	5–2	1st	
1939–40	Adolph Rupp	15–6	4–4	1st	
1940–41	Adolph Rupp	17–8	8–1	2nd	
1941–42	Adolph Rupp	19–6	6–2	1st	NCAA Final Four
1942–43	Adolph Rupp	17–6	8–1	2nd	
1943–44	Adolph Rupp	19–2	–	1st	NIT Third Place
1944–45	Adolph Rupp	22–4	5–0	1st	NCAA Elite Eight
1945–46	Adolph Rupp	28–2	6–0	1st	NIT champion
1946–47	Adolph Rupp	34–3	11–0	1st	NIT Runner–up
1947–48	Adolph Rupp	36–3	9–0	1st	NCAA champion
1948–49	Adolph Rupp	32–2	13–0	1st	NCAA champion
1949–50	Adolph Rupp	25–5	11–2	1st	NIT first round
1950–51	Adolph Rupp	32–2	14–0	1st	NCAA champion
1951–52	Adolph Rupp	29–3	14–0	1st	NCAA Elite Eight
1952–53	No season	^{[Note A]}	^{[Note A]}	^{[Note A]}	Ineligible
1953–54	Adolph Rupp	25–0	14–0	T–1st	Helms National Champion^{[Note B]}
1954–55	Adolph Rupp	23–3	12–2	1st	NCAA Sweet Sixteen
1955–56	Adolph Rupp	20–6	12–2	2nd	NCAA Elite Eight
1956–57	Adolph Rupp	23–5	12–2	1st	NCAA University Division Elite Eight
1957–58	Adolph Rupp	23–6	12–2	1st	NCAA University Division champion
1958–59	Adolph Rupp	24–3	12–2	2nd	NCAA University Division Sweet Sixteen
1959–60	Adolph Rupp	18–7	10–4	3rd	
1960–61	Adolph Rupp	19–9	11–4	2nd	NCAA University Division Elite Eight
1961–62	Adolph Rupp	23–3	13–1	1st	NCAA University Division Elite Eight
1962–63	Adolph Rupp	16–9	8–6	5th	
1963–64	Adolph Rupp	21–6	11–3	1st	NCAA University Division Sweet Sixteen
1964–65	Adolph Rupp	15–10	10–6	5th	
1965–66	Adolph Rupp	27–2	15–1	1st	NCAA University Division Runner–up
1966–67	Adolph Rupp	13–13	8–10	5th	
1967–68	Adolph Rupp	22–5	15–3	1st	NCAA University Division Elite Eight
1968–69	Adolph Rupp	23–5	16–2	1st	NCAA University Division Sweet Sixteen
1969–70	Adolph Rupp	26–2	17–1	1st	NCAA University Division Elite Eight
1970–71	Adolph Rupp	22–6	16–2	1st	NCAA University Division Sweet Sixteen
1971–72	Adolph Rupp	21–7	14–4	1st	NCAA University Division Elite Eight
Adolph Rupp:		876–190 (.822)	399–75		
Joe B. Hall (Southeastern Conference) (1972–1985)
1972–73	Joe B. Hall	20–8	14–4	1st	NCAA University Division Elite Eight
1973–74	Joe B. Hall	13–13	9–9	4th	
1974–75	Joe B. Hall	26–5	15–3	1st	NCAA Division I Runner–up
1975–76	Joe B. Hall	20–10	11–7	4th	NIT champion
1976–77	Joe B. Hall	26–4	16–2	1st	NCAA Division I Elite Eight
1977–78	Joe B. Hall	30–2	16–2	1st	NCAA Division I champion
1978–79	Joe B. Hall	19–12	10–8	6th	NIT first round
1979–80	Joe B. Hall	29–6	15–3	1st	NCAA Division I Sweet Sixteen
1980–81	Joe B. Hall	22–6	15–3	2nd	NCAA Division I second round
1981–82	Joe B. Hall	22–8	13–5	1st	NCAA Division I second round
1982–83	Joe B. Hall	23–8	13–5	1st	NCAA Division I Elite Eight
1983–84	Joe B. Hall	29–5	14–4	1st	NCAA Division I Final Four
1984–85	Joe B. Hall	18–13	11–7	4th	NCAA Division I Sweet Sixteen
Joe B. Hall:		297–100 (.748)	172–62		
Eddie Sutton (Southeastern Conference) (1985–1989)
1985–86	Eddie Sutton	32–4	17–1	1st	NCAA Division I Elite Eight
1986–87	Eddie Sutton	18–11	10–8	4th	NCAA Division I first round
1987–88	Eddie Sutton	25–5^{[Note C]}	13–5^{[Note C]}	1st^{[Note C]}	NCAA Division I Sweet Sixteen
1988–89	Eddie Sutton	13–19	8–10	6th	
Eddie Sutton:		88–39 (.693)	48–24		
Rick Pitino (Southeastern Conference) (1989–1997)
1989–90	Rick Pitino	14–14^{[Note D]}	10–8	T–4th	Ineligible
1990–91	Rick Pitino	22–6^{[Note D]}	14–4^{[Note E]}	1st^{[Note E]}	Ineligible
1991–92	Rick Pitino	29–7	12–4	1st (East)	NCAA Division I Elite Eight
1992–93	Rick Pitino	30–4	13–3	2nd (East)	NCAA Division I Final Four
1993–94	Rick Pitino	27–7	12–4	T–1st (East)	NCAA Division I second round
1994–95	Rick Pitino	28–5	14–2	1st (East)	NCAA Division I Elite Eight
1995–96	Rick Pitino	34–2	16–0	1st (East)	NCAA Division I champion
1996–97	Rick Pitino	35–5	13–3	2nd (East)	NCAA Division I Runner–up
Rick Pitino:		219–50 (.814)	104–28		
Tubby Smith (Southeastern Conference) (1997–2007)
1997–98	Tubby Smith	35–4	14–2	1st (East)	NCAA Division I champion
1998–99	Tubby Smith	28–9	11–5	2nd (East)	NCAA Division I Elite Eight
1999–00	Tubby Smith	23–10	12–4	T–1st (East)	NCAA Division I second round
2000–01	Tubby Smith	24–10	12–4	T–1st (East)	NCAA Division I Sweet Sixteen
2001–02	Tubby Smith	22–10	10–6	T–1st (East)	NCAA Division I Sweet Sixteen
2002–03	Tubby Smith	32–4	16–0	1st (East)	NCAA Division I Elite Eight
2003–04	Tubby Smith	27–5	13–3	1st (East)	NCAA Division I second round
2004–05	Tubby Smith	28–6	14–2	1st (East)	NCAA Division I Elite Eight
2005–06	Tubby Smith	22–13	9–7	3rd (East)	NCAA Division I second round
2006–07	Tubby Smith	22–12	9–7	4th (East)	NCAA Division I second round
Tubby Smith:		263–83 (.760)	120–40		
Billy Gillispie (Southeastern Conference) (2007–2009)
2007–08	Billy Gillispie	18–13	12–4	2nd (East)	NCAA Division I first round
2008–09	Billy Gillispie	22–14	8–8	4th (East)	NIT Quarterfinal
Billy Gillispie:		40–27 (.597)	20–12		
John Calipari (Southeastern Conference) (2009–2024)
2009–10	John Calipari	35–3	14–2	1st (East)	NCAA Division I Elite Eight
2010–11	John Calipari	29–9	10–6	2nd (East)	NCAA Division I Final Four
2011–12	John Calipari	38–2	16–0	1st	NCAA Division I champion
2012–13	John Calipari	21–12	12–6	2nd	NIT first round
2013–14	John Calipari	29–11	12–6	2nd	NCAA Division I Runner–up
2014–15	John Calipari	38–1	18–0	1st	NCAA Division I Final Four
2015–16	John Calipari	27–9	13–5	T–1st	NCAA Division I second round
2016–17	John Calipari	32–6	16–2	1st	NCAA Division I Elite Eight
2017–18	John Calipari	26–11	10–8	4th	NCAA Division I Sweet Sixteen
2018–19	John Calipari	30–7	15–3	T–2nd	NCAA Division I Elite Eight
2019–20	John Calipari	25–6	15–3	1st	No postseason held
2020–21	John Calipari	9–16	8–9	8th	
2021–22	John Calipari	26–8	14–4	3rd	NCAA Division I first round
2022–23	John Calipari	22–12	12–6	3rd	NCAA Division I second round
2023–24	John Calipari	23–10	13–5	T-2nd	NCAA Division I first round
John Calipari:		410–123 (.769)	198–65		
Mark Pope (Southeastern Conference) (2024–present)
2024–25	Mark Pope	24–12	10–8	7th	NCAA Division I Sweet Sixteen
2025–26	Mark Pope	22–14	10–8	T–7th	NCAA Division I second round
Mark Pope:		46–26 (.639)	20–16		
Total:		2,444–784–1 (.757)			
National champion Postseason invitational champion Conference regular season champion Conference regular season and conference tournament champion Division regular season champion Division regular season and conference tournament champion Conference tournament champion

=== Notes ===
^A. Due to several Kentucky players found to be involved in a point-shaving scandal, the NCAA banned the school from the 1953 NCAA tournament and asked its member institutions to boycott playing the Wildcats. Thus, Kentucky's 1952–53 season was cancelled.
^B. After defeating LSU in a one-game playoff to win the 1954 SEC championship, three Kentucky players were ruled ineligible for the postseason because they had graduated in 1953 (when UK was banned from competing). As a result, Kentucky declined an invitation to the NCAA Tournament in protest.
^C. Two victories (and one loss) from the NCAA tournament were vacated in the 1987–88 season as part of NCAA sanctions. Kentucky was also stripped of SEC regular season and SEC tournament championships.
^D. Kentucky was banned from the 1989–90 and 1990–91 NCAA and SEC tournaments due to sanctions from the Eddie Sutton era.
^E. Kentucky finished first in the SEC standings in 1990–91 season. However, due to probation and their tournament ban, they were ineligible for the regular-season championship. (The title was awarded to LSU and Mississippi State instead.)
