= 1973–74 Yale Bulldogs men's basketball team =

American college basketball season

1973–74 Yale Bulldogs men's basketball
- Conference: Ivy League
- Record: 8–16 (5–9 Ivy)
- Head coach: Joe Vancisin (17th season)
- Home arena: John J. Lee Amphitheater

The 1973–74 Yale Bulldogs men's basketball team represented Yale University during the 1973–74 men's college basketball season. The Bulldogs, led by 17th year head coach Joe Vancisin, played their home games at John J. Lee Amphitheater of the Payne Whitney Gymnasium and were members of the Ivy League. They finished the season 8–16, 5–9 in Ivy League play to finish in fifth place.

== Schedule ==
Date time, TV	Rank^{#}	Opponent^{#}	Result	Record	Site city, state
December 1*		Connecticut	L 80–102	0–1	Hugh S. Greer Field House; Storrs, CT
December 5*		Fordham	L 82–92 ^{OT}	0–2	Payne Whitney Gymnasium; New Haven, CT
December 8*		Holy Cross	W 102–92	1–2	Payne Whitney Gymnasium; New Haven, CT
December 12		Brown	L 56–63	1–3 (0–1)	Payne Whitney Gymnasium; New Haven, CT
December 21*		at Michigan	L 88–101	1–4 (0–1)	
December 22*		vs. Fordham	L 72–88	1–5 (0–1)	
December 27*		vs. Old Dominion	L 82–110	1–6 (0–1)	
December 28*		vs. Georgia Tech	W 101–95	2–6 (0–1)	
December 29*		at Duke	L 80–105	2–7 (0–1)	Cameron Indoor Stadium; Durham, NC
January 4		at Columbia	W 59–54	3–7 (1–1)	University Heights Gymnasium; Broadway, NY
January 5		at Cornell	W 89–86	4–7 (2–1)	Barton Hall; Ithaca, NY
January 9		at Brown	L 70–102	4–8 (2–2)	Providence Civic Center; Providence, RI
January 19		at Harvard	L 53–59	4–9 (2–3)	Malkin Athletic Center; Cambridge, Massachusetts
January 22*		Amherst	W 88–64	5–9 (3–3)	Payne Whitney Gymnasium; New Haven, CT
January 26*		at Boston College	L 72–88	5–10 (3–3)	Roberts Center; Chestnut Hill, Massachusetts
February 1		at Dartmouth	W 73–63	6–10 (4–3)	Alumni Gymnasium; Hanover, NH
February 8		Penn	L 56–80	6–11 (4–4)	Payne Whitney Gymnasium; New Haven, CT
February 9		Princeton	L 58–70	6–12 (4–5)	Payne Whitney Gymnasium; New Haven, CT
February 15		Cornell	W 107–72	7–12 (5–5)	Payne Whitney Gymnasium; New Haven, CT
February 16		Columbia	L 65–69	7–13 (5–6)	Payne Whitney Gymnasium; New Haven, CT
February 22		at Princeton	L 60–78	7–14 (5–7)	Jadwin Gymnasium; Princeton, NJ
February 23		at Penn	L 79–90	7–15 (5–8)	The Palestra; Philadelphia, Pennsylvania
March 1		Harvard	L 65–87	7–16 (5–9)	Payne Whitney Gymnasium; New Haven, CT
March 2		Dartmouth	W 82–58	8–16 (6–9)	Payne Whitney Gymnasium; New Haven, CT
*Non-conference game. ^{#}Rankings from AP Poll. (#) Tournament seedings in parentheses.
