= 1973–74 Duke Blue Devils men's basketball team =

American college basketball season

1973–74 Duke Blue Devils men's basketball
- Conference: Atlantic Coast Conference
- Record: 10–16 (2–10 ACC)
- Head coach: Neill McGeachy
- Home arena: Cameron Indoor Stadium; Durham, North Carolina

1973–74 ACC men's basketball standings
	Conf.				Overall
Team	W		L	PCT	W		L	PCT
No. 1 NC State †	12	–	0	1.000	30	–	1	.968
No. 4 Maryland	9	–	3	.750	23	–	5	.821
No. 12 North Carolina	9	–	3	.750	22	–	6	.786
Virginia	4	–	8	.333	11	–	16	.407
Clemson	3	–	9	.250	14	–	12	.538
Wake Forest	3	–	9	.250	13	–	13	.500
Duke	2	–	10	.167	10	–	16	.385
† 1974 ACC tournament winner Rankings from AP Poll

The 1973–74 Duke Blue Devils men's basketball team represented Duke University in the 1973–74 NCAA Division I men's basketball season. The head coach was Neill McGeachy and the team finished the season with an overall record of 10–16 and did not qualify for the NCAA tournament.

== Schedule ==
Date time, TV	Rank^{#}	Opponent^{#}	Result	Record	Site city, state
December 1, 1973*		East Carolina	W 82–69	1–0	Cameron Indoor Stadium; Durham, N.C.
December 3, 1973*		at William & Mary	W 93–79	2–0	
December 8, 1973		at Virginia	L 82–104	2–1	
December 10, 1973*		Appalachian State	W 83–53	3–1	Cameron Indoor Stadium; Durham, N.C.
December 26, 1973*		vs. Western Kentucky; Gator Bowl Classic	W 75–69	4–1	Jacksonville Coliseum; Jacksonville, Fla.
December 27, 1973*		vs. Florida; Gator Bowl Classic	L 60–77	4–2	Jacksonville Coliseum; Jacksonville, Fla.
December 29, 1973*		Yale	W 105–80	5–2	Cameron Indoor Stadium; Durham, N.C.
January 4, 1974		vs. Wake Forest; Big Four Tournament	L 61–64	5–3	Greensboro Coliseum; Greensboro, N.C.
January 5, 1974		vs. No. 4 North Carolina; Big Four Tournament	L 75–84	5–4	Greensboro Coliseum; Greensboro, N.C.
January 12, 1974*		at Pittsburgh	L 46–62	5–5	
January 16, 1974		Clemson	W 63–50	6–5	Cameron Indoor Stadium; Durham, N.C.
January 19, 1974		No. 5 North Carolina	L 71–73	6–6	Cameron Indoor Stadium; Durham, N.C.
January 23, 1974		Wake Forest	L 71–90	6–7	Cameron Indoor Stadium; Durham, N.C.
January 26, 1974*		at Princeton	W 73–65	7–7	
January 30, 1974*		Davidson	W 89–72	8–7	Cameron Indoor Stadium; Durham, N.C.
February 2, 1974		at No. 6 Maryland	L 83–104	8–8	
February 4, 1974		NC State	L 78–92	8–9	Cameron Indoor Stadium; Durham, N.C.
February 6, 1974		at Wake Forest	L 67–74	8–10	
February 9, 1974*		at No. 3 Notre Dame	L 68–87	8–11	
February 13, 1974		Virginia	W 88–78	9–11	Cameron Indoor Stadium; Durham, N.C.
February 16, 1974		Georgia Tech	W 70–60	10–11	Cameron Indoor Stadium; Durham, N.C.
February 20, 1974		at NC State	L 87–113	10–12	
February 23, 1974		No. 5 Maryland	L 61–64	10–13	Cameron Indoor Stadium; Durham, N.C.
February 27, 1974		at Clemson	L 68–74	10–14	
March 2, 1974		at No. 4 North Carolina	L 92–96 ^{OT}	10–15	
March 7, 1974		vs. No. 4 Maryland; ACC tournament	L 66–85	10–16	Greensboro Coliseum; Greensboro, N.C.
*Non-conference game. ^{#}Rankings from AP Poll. (#) Tournament seedings in parentheses. Source: Duke media guide
