= 1974 ACC men's basketball tournament =

- Classification: Division I
- Season: 1973–74
- Teams: 7
- Site: Greensboro Coliseum; Greensboro, North Carolina
- Champions: NC State (8th title)
- Winning coach: Norm Sloan (3rd title)
- MVP: Tommy Burleson (NC State)

1973–74 ACC men's basketball standings
	Conf.				Overall
Team	W		L	PCT	W		L	PCT
No. 1 NC State †	12	–	0	1.000	30	–	1	.968
No. 4 Maryland	9	–	3	.750	23	–	5	.821
No. 12 North Carolina	9	–	3	.750	22	–	6	.786
Virginia	4	–	8	.333	11	–	16	.407
Clemson	3	–	9	.250	14	–	12	.538
Wake Forest	3	–	9	.250	13	–	13	.500
Duke	2	–	10	.167	10	–	16	.385
† 1974 ACC tournament winner Rankings from AP Poll

The 1974 Atlantic Coast Conference men's basketball tournament was held in Greensboro, North Carolina, at the Greensboro Coliseum from March 7–9. NC State defeated Maryland in overtime, 103–100, to win the championship. Tommy Burleson of NC State was named the tournament MVP.

The final has been described by the players involved as the most exciting ACC game they ever played. The game was instrumental in forcing the expansion of the NCAA Division I men's basketball tournament to 32 teams, thus allowing more than one bid from a conference. Bill Free of the Baltimore Sun newspaper regards this seasons Maryland team as the greatest team that did not participate in the NCAA tournament, citing their 6 NBA draft picks.

Many considered it the all-time greatest college basketball game until Duke pulled off a last-second overtime finish in the 1992 NCAA Division I East Regional final for a 104–103 win over Kentucky. "I know they call the Duke–Kentucky game the greatest now," said Burleson in 1999 at a 25-year commemoration of the 1974 game, "but we're still the greatest ACC game ever."

NC State won the 1974 NCAA tournament, dethroning Bill Walton and seven-time defending national champion UCLA in the semifinals in another classic, before defeating Marquette in the final.

== Bracket ==
Quarterfinals; March 7
4	Virginia	68
5	Clemson	63
2	#4 Maryland	85
7	Duke	66
3	#6 North Carolina	76
6	Wake Forest	62

Semifinals; March 8
1	#1 NC State	87
4	Virginia	66
2	#4 Maryland	105
3	#6 North Carolina	85

Championship Game; March 9
1	#1 NC State	103^{OT}
2	#4 Maryland	100
