= 1973–74 NC State Wolfpack men's basketball team =

American college basketball season

1973–74 North Carolina State Wolfpack men's basketball
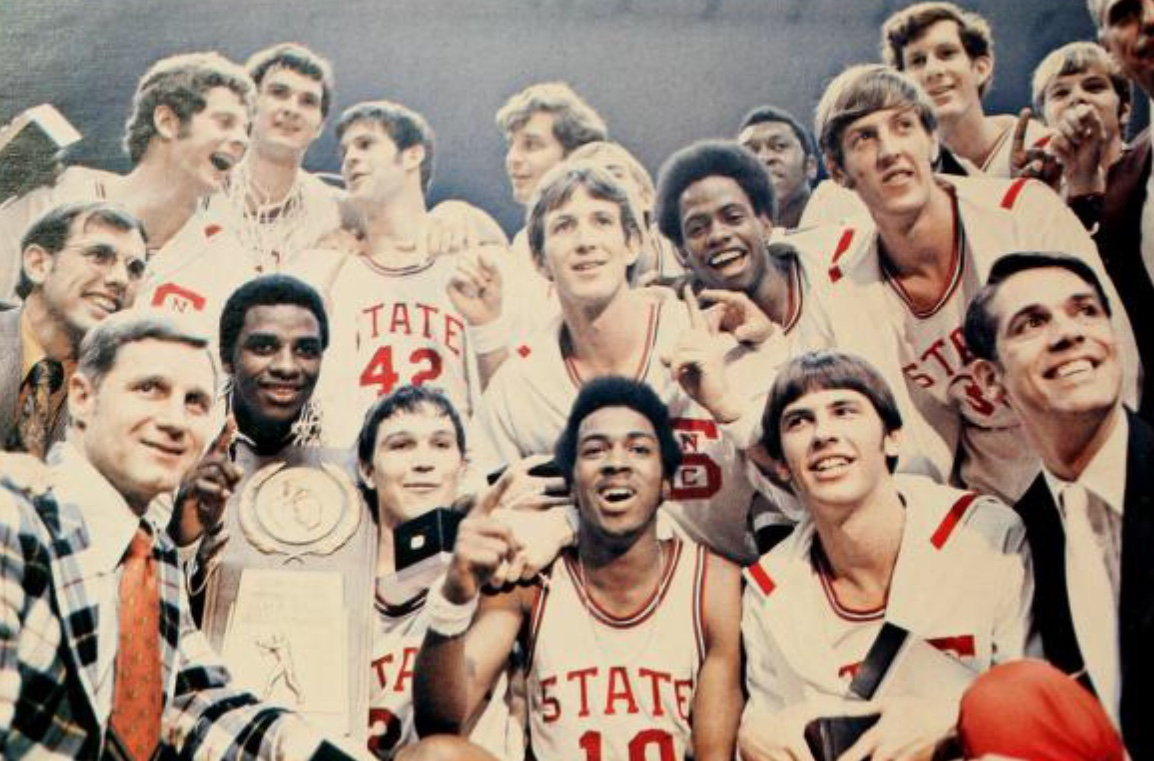

NCAA tournament National Champions NCAA Division I regular season champions ACC tournament champions ACC regular season champions

National Championship Game, W 76–64 vs. Marquette
- Conference: Atlantic Coast Conference

Ranking
- Coaches: No. 1
- AP: No. 1
- Record: 30–1 (12–0 ACC)
- Head coach: Norm Sloan (8th season)
- Assistant coaches: Ed Biedenbach; Sam Esposito; Art Musselman
- Captain: Game captains
- Home arena: Reynolds Coliseum

1973–74 ACC men's basketball standings
	Conf.				Overall
Team	W		L	PCT	W		L	PCT
No. 1 NC State †	12	–	0	1.000	30	–	1	.968
No. 4 Maryland	9	–	3	.750	23	–	5	.821
No. 12 North Carolina	9	–	3	.750	22	–	6	.786
Virginia	4	–	8	.333	11	–	16	.407
Clemson	3	–	9	.250	14	–	12	.538
Wake Forest	3	–	9	.250	13	–	13	.500
Duke	2	–	10	.167	10	–	16	.385
† 1974 ACC tournament winner Rankings from AP Poll

The 1973–74 North Carolina State Wolfpack men's basketball team represented North Carolina State University during the 1973-74 NCAA Division I men's basketball season. The Wolfpack played their home games at Reynolds Coliseum in Raleigh, North Carolina, and competed as a member of the Atlantic Coast Conference. While losing only one game throughout the season, the team finished undefeated in the ACC conference play, and went on to win the 1974 ACC men's basketball title. The Wolfpack then won the NCAA tournament, finishing the season as the national champions.

== Season summary ==
NC State had several highly rated players, including star high-jumping forward David Thompson, 7-foot-4 center Tom Burleson, point guard Monte Towe, and several complementary players, including guard Moe Rivers and forward Phil Spence. The Wolfpack began the season ranked #2 in the nation, behind John Wooden's UCLA. On December 15, 1973, the two top-ranked teams met in St. Louis, with UCLA beating NC State by 84–66 after trailing by one at halftime. It would be the only loss for the Wolfpack that season. NC State later met and defeated the Bruins 80–77 in two overtimes in the NCAA tournament semi-final game, ending UCLA's streak of seven straight national championships. Two nights later, NC State won its first NCAA championship by beating Marquette, 76–64.

== Roster ==
1973–74 NC State Wolfpack men's basketball team
Players
Coaches

Pos.	#	Name	Height	Weight	Year	Hometown
C	24	Tommy Burleson	7 ft 4 in (2.24 m)	235 lb (107 kg)	Sr	Newland, North Carolina
C	50	Mike Buurma	6 ft 10 in (2.08 m)	220 lb (100 kg)	Fr	Willard, Ohio
G	32	Bruce Dayhuff	6 ft 2 in (1.88 m)	175 lb (79 kg)	Fr	Walkerton, Indiana
F	14	Greg Hawkins	6 ft 5 in (1.96 m)	185 lb (84 kg)	Sr	Huntington, West Virginia
G	22	Dwight Johnson	6 ft 0 in (1.83 m)	160 lb (73 kg)	So	Raleigh, North Carolina
G	34	Craig Kuszmaul	6 ft 5 in (1.96 m)	181 lb (82 kg)	Jr	Warren, Ohio
C	35	Bill Lake	6 ft 11 in (2.11 m)	190 lb (86 kg)	Fr	Carmel, Indiana
G	40	Mark Moeller	6 ft 3 in (1.91 m)	175 lb (79 kg)	Jr	Canfield, Ohio
F	52	Steve Nuce	6 ft 8 in (2.03 m)	210 lb (95 kg)	Sr	Rockville, Maryland
G	10	Moe Rivers	6 ft 1 in (1.85 m)	165 lb (75 kg)	Jr	Brooklyn, New York
F	30	Phil Spence	6 ft 8 in (2.03 m)	215 lb (98 kg)	So	Raleigh, North Carolina
F	42	Tim Stoddard	6 ft 7 in (2.01 m)	225 lb (102 kg)	Jr	East Chicago, Indiana
F	44	David Thompson	6 ft 4 in (1.93 m)	195 lb (88 kg)	Jr	Shelby, North Carolina
G	25	Monte Towe	5 ft 7 in (1.7 m)	145 lb (66 kg)	Jr	Converse, Indiana

Head coach

- Norm Sloan (NC State)

Assistant coach(es)

- Art Musselman (The Citadel)
- Sam Esposito (Indiana)
- Eddie Biedenbach (NC State)

Legend

- (C) Team captain
- (S) Suspended
- (I) Ineligible
- (W) Walk-on
- Injured
- Current redshirt

== Schedule ==
Date time, TV	Rank^{#}	Opponent^{#}	Result	Record	Site city, state
Regular Season
December 5*	No. 2	East Carolina	W 79–47	1–0	Reynolds Coliseum; Raleigh, NC
December 7*	No. 2	Vermont	W 97–42	2–0	Reynolds Coliseum; Raleigh, NC
December 15*; ABC	No. 2	vs. No. 1 UCLA	L 66–84	2–1	St. Louis Arena; St. Louis, MO
December 18*	No. 5	Georgia	W 94–60	3–1	Reynolds Coliseum; Raleigh, NC
December 28*	No. 5	vs. Villanova; Sugar Bowl Tournament	W 97–82	4–1	Municipal Auditorium; New Orleans, LA
December 29*	No. 5	vs. No. 18 Memphis State; Sugar Bowl Tournament	W 98–83	5–1	Municipal Auditorium; New Orleans, LA
January 4*	No. 5	No. 4 North Carolina; Big Four Tournament	W 78–77	6–1	Greensboro Coliseum; Greensboro, NC
January 5*	No. 5	vs. Wake Forest; Big Four Tournament	W 91–73	7–1	Greensboro Coliseum; Greensboro, NC
January 12	No. 4	Clemson	W 96–68	8–1 (1–0)	Reynolds Coliseum; Raleigh, NC
January 13	No. 4	No. 3 Maryland	W 80–74	9–1 (2–0)	Reynolds Coliseum; Raleigh, NC
January 17	No. 3	at Virginia	W 90–70	10–1 (3–0)	University Hall; Charlottesville, VA
January 19*	No. 3	UNC Charlotte	W 104–72	11–1	Reynolds Coliseum; Raleigh, NC
January 22	No. 3	at No. 4 North Carolina	W 83–80	12–1 (4–0)	Carmichael Auditorium; Chapel Hill, NC
January 26*	No. 3	at Purdue	W 86–81	13–1	Mackey Arena; West Lafayette, IN
January 30	No. 2	at No. 6 Maryland	W 86–80	14–1 (5–0)	Cole Field House; College Park, MD
February 2	No. 2	Virginia	W 105–93	15–1 (6–0)	Reynolds Coliseum; Raleigh, NC
February 4	No. 2	at Duke	W 92–78	16–1 (7–0)	Cameron Indoor Stadium; Durham, NC
February 8*	No. 2	vs. Georgia Tech; North-South Doubleheader	W 98–54	17–1	Charlotte Coliseum; Charlotte, NC
February 9*	No. 2	vs. Furman; North-South Doubleheader	W 111–91	18–1	Charlotte Coliseum; Charlotte, NC
February 13*	No. 2	Davidson	W 105–78	19–1	Reynolds Coliseum; Raleigh, NC
February 16	No. 2	Wake Forest	W 111–96	20–1 (8–0)	Reynolds Coliseum; Raleigh, NC
February 20	No. 1	Duke	W 113–87	21–1 (9–0)	Reynolds Coliseum; Raleigh, NC
February 23	No. 1	at Clemson	W 80–75	22–1 (10–0)	Littlejohn Coliseum; Clemson, SC
February 26	No. 1	No. 4 North Carolina	W 83–72	23–1 (11–0)	Reynolds Coliseum; Raleigh, NC
March 2	No. 1	at Wake Forest	W 72–63	24–1 (12–0)	Winston-Salem War Memorial Coliseum; Winston-Salem, NC
ACC tournament
March 8*	No. 1	vs. Virginia; ACC tournament	W 87–66	25–1	Greensboro Coliseum; Greensboro, NC
March 9*	No. 1	vs. No. 4 Maryland; ACC tournament	W 103–100 ^{OT}	26–1	Greensboro Coliseum; Greensboro, NC
NCAA tournament
March 14*	No. 1	vs. No. 5 Providence; NCAA tournament • Regional semifinals	W 92–78	27–1	Reynolds Coliseum; Raleigh, NC
March 16*	No. 1	vs. No. 13 Pittsburgh; NCAA tournament • Regional Final	W 100–72	28–1	Reynolds Coliseum; Raleigh, NC
March 23*	No. 1	vs. No. 2 UCLA; NCAA tournament • National semifinals	W 80–77 ^{2OT}	29–1	Greensboro Coliseum; Greensboro, NC
March 25*	No. 1	vs. No. 3 Marquette; NCAA tournament • National Championship	W 76–64	30–1	Greensboro Coliseum; Greensboro, NC
*Non-conference game. ^{#}Rankings from AP Poll. (#) Tournament seedings in parentheses. E=East.

== Rankings ==
Ranking movements Legend: ██ Increase in ranking ██ Decrease in ranking
	Week																	
Poll	Pre	1	2	3	4	5	6	7	8	9	10	11	12	13	14	15	16	Final
AP	2	2	2	5	5	5	4	3	3	2	2	2	1	1	1	1	1	1
Coaches	Not released		2	6	5	5	4	3	3	2	2	2	1	1	1	1	Not released	

== ACC tournament ==
The 1974 Atlantic Coast Conference men's basketball tournament was held in Greensboro, North Carolina, at the Greensboro Coliseum from March 7 to 9. NC State defeated Maryland 103–100 in overtime to claim the championship.

The final featured two of the top teams in the country. It has been regarded by many to be the greatest ACC game in history — and one of the greatest college games ever. The game was instrumental in forcing the expansion of the NCAA Men's Division I Basketball Championship to 32 teams, allowing more than one bid from a conference.

== NCAA tournament ==
1974 NCAA tournament championship Game Box Score
Player	Min	FG	FT	REB	AST	PF	PTS
D. Thompson	40	7–12	7–8	7	2	3	21
M. Towe	37	5–10	6–7	3	2	1	16
T. Burleson	36	6–9	2–6	11	0	4	14
M. Rivers	40	4–9	6–9	2	5	2	14
T. Stoddard	25	3–4	2–2	7	2	5	8
P. Spence	19	1–2	1–2	3	3	2	3
M. Moeller	3	0–0	0–0	0	0	0	0
Totals	200	26–46	24–34	34	14	17	76

- East
  - North Carolina State 92, Providence 78
  - North Carolina State 100, Pittsburgh 72
- Final Four
  - North Carolina State 80, UCLA 77
  - North Carolina State 76, Marquette 64

== Awards and honors ==
- Tommy Burleson, ACC tournament MVP.
- David Thompson, NCAA Men's MOP Award

== Team players drafted into the NBA ==
Round	Pick	Player	NBA club
1	3	Tommy Burleson	Seattle SuperSonics
