= 1973–74 Idaho State Bengals men's basketball team =

American college basketball season

1973–74 Idaho State Bengals men's basketball
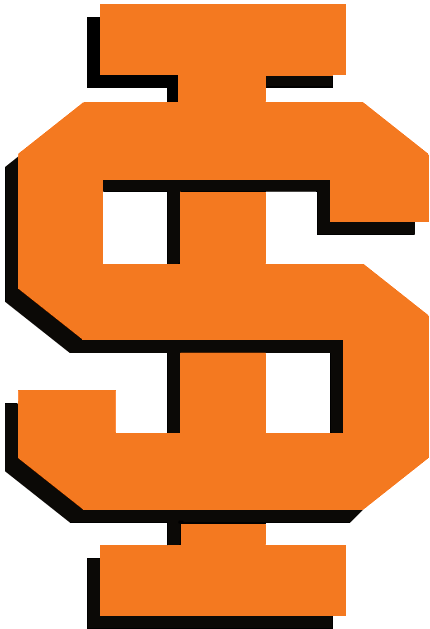

Big Sky Champions

NCAA tournament, First round
- Conference: Big Sky Conference
- Record: 20–8 (11–3 Big Sky)
- Head coach: Jim Killingsworth (3rd season)
- Home arena: ISU Minidome

1973–74 Big Sky men's basketball standings
	Conf.				Overall
Team	W		L	PCT	W		L	PCT
Idaho State †	11	–	3	.786	20	–	8	.714
Montana	11	–	3	.786	19	–	8	.704
Weber State	8	–	6	.571	14	–	12	.538
Gonzaga	7	–	7	.500	13	–	13	.500
Boise State	6	–	8	.429	12	–	14	.462
Idaho	5	–	9	.357	12	–	14	.462
Montana State	5	–	9	.357	11	–	15	.423
Northern Arizona	3	–	11	.214	3	–	18	.143
† One-game playoff winner

The 1973–74 Idaho State Bengals men's basketball team represented Idaho State University during the 1973–74 NCAA Division I men's basketball season.

The Bengals were led by third-year head coach Jim Killingsworth and played their home games on campus at the ISU Minidome in Pocatello. They finished the regular season at 19–7 overall, with a 11–3 record in the Big Sky Conference, as did the Montana Grizzlies, and the teams split their season series.

With two years until the conference tournament was introduced, the Big Sky title was decided with an unscheduled one-game playoff at Missoula on Tuesday night. A coin flip eleven days earlier determined the host. Before a record crowd at Dahlberg Arena, the visiting Bengals won 60–57 and advanced to the 25-team NCAA tournament, their first appearance in fourteen years.

ISU hosted the first round (subregional) of the West regional, and met #17 New Mexico (20–6) in the nightcap on Saturday night. The visiting Lobos, WAC champions, won by eight to end the Bengals' season at 20–8.

Senior forward Jim Anderson was named to the all-conference team; senior center Dan Spindler and junior guard Kevin Hoyt were honorable mention.

Idaho State returned to the NCAA tournament three years later and advanced to the Elite Eight, which remains the best-ever showing for a Big Sky team.

== Postseason results ==
Date time, TV	Rank^{#}	Opponent^{#}	Result	Record	Site (attendance) city, state
Big Sky Playoff
Tue, March 5		at Montana; Playoff	W 60–57	20–7	Dahlberg Arena (8,343); Missoula, Montana
NCAA tournament
Sat, March 9*; 9:10 pm		vs. No. 17 New Mexico; First round	L 65–73	20–8	ISU Minidome (9,000); Pocatello, Idaho
*Non-conference game. ^{#}Rankings from AP Poll. (#) Tournament seedings in parentheses. All times are in Mountain time.
