= Phil Spence =

American basketball player and coach (1954–2026)

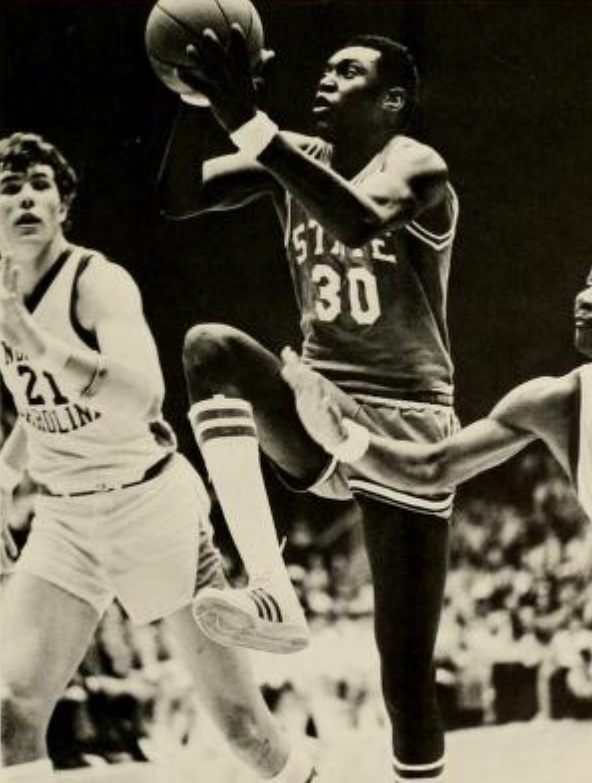
- Spence from the 1974 Agromeck

Personal information
- Born: March 13, 1954 Raleigh, North Carolina, U.S.
- Died: September 21, 2026 (aged 72)
- Listed height: 6 ft 8 in (2.03 m)
- Listed weight: 215 lb (98 kg)

Career information
- High school: Broughton (Raleigh, North Carolina)
- College: Vincennes (1972–1973); NC State (1973–1976)
- NBA draft: 1976: 6th round, 92nd overall pick
- Drafted by: Milwaukee Bucks
- Position: Forward

Career history

Coaching
- 1979–1989: Cary HS
- 1989–1999: East Wake HS
- 2000–2004: North Carolina Central

Career highlights
- As player: NCAA champion (1974); NJCAA All-American (1973); As coach: CIAA Coach of the Year (2003)
- Stats at Basketball Reference

Phil Spence (March 13, 1954 – September 21, 2026) was an American basketball player and coach. He was a key contributor on the 1974 North Carolina State Wolfpack national championship team.

== Early life ==
Spence was born in Raleigh, North Carolina, on March 13, 1954. He attended Broughton High School in Raleigh where he starred on the basketball team. As a junior center, he led Broughton to the state 4-A tournament in 1971. His senior year, Spence was Wake County Player of the Year. He was also a Converse All-American. He graduated from Broughton in 1972.

He was recruited by junior college Vincennes University as a forward. His freshman year, he was selected a National Junior College Athletic Association All-American for 1972–1973. However, he transferred to North Carolina State University his sophomore year, graduating with a B.S. in vocational industrial education in 1976.

== Career ==
=== Basketball ===
Spence transferred to North Carolina State University (NC State) in time to become a key reserve on a team that was the Atlantic Coast Conference (ACC) regular-season champion, the ACC tournament champion, and the 1974 NCAA Division I Men's Basketball Championship team. As a sophomore, Spence was the first player off the bench and averaged 6.0 points and 6.3 rebounds a game as the Wolfpack went 30-1 and broke UCLA's string of seven straight titles.

He used to call himself and the team's other Black players "The Jive Five." NC State's first Black basketball player to have a full scholarship was selected in 1969, so this "group of tall Black students at NC State was new" in 1973 when just 3% of students were Black. The Jive Five included Dwight Johnson, Moe Rivers, Phil Spence, and David Thompson.

Spence started the next two seasons at NC State, his junior and senior years. As a junior, he led the team with 281 rebounds and was third in scoring with 368 points, averaging 13.1 points and 10.0 rebounds a game. He was the top rebounder in sixteen of the team's 28 games in the 1974–1975 season, and high scorer for three games.

In his senior year, he was the team's second-leading scorer and rebounder with 438 points, averaging 14.6 points and 9.1 rebounds per game. He was the top rebounder in ten of thirty games and was the high scorer twice. That year, NC State did not win the ACC Tournament to gain entry to the NCAA championship; however, they did play in the National Invitational Tournament, winning two games and losing the third by one point.

Throughout is college career, Spence's field goal average was 54.2% and his free throw average was 74.3%.

The 6 foot 8 inches tall and 215-pound Spence was selected in the 6th round of the 1976 NBA draft by the Milwaukee Bucks (6th pick, 92nd pick overall), however, he did not make the final roster.

=== Coaching ===
Following the end of his basketball career, Spence turned to coaching. He spent a year teaching and volunteering as an assistant varsity boys' basketball coach under his former head coach Ed McLean at Broughton High School starting in 1977. He then coached basketball at Cary High School from 1979 to 1989, serving as the junior varsity coach for four years and as head varsity coach for six years.

Spence was the head coach at East Wake High School in Raleigh from 1989 to 1999. He led East Wake to three consecutive state playoff appearances and won the Tri-6 Conference championship four times. He was selected the Wake County Coach of the Year and the Tri-6 Conference Coach of the Year in both 1991 and 1992.

After leaving East Wake, Spence worked with behavior emotional disadvantaged youth in grades 6 through 12 as the career development coordinator at Longview School in Raleigh.

On July 14, 2000, Spence was named head coach of North Carolina Central University (NCCU), replacing Greg Jackson. Spence coached four seasons at NCCU through the 2003–04 season, He was the 2003 Central Intercollegiate Athletic Association (CIAA) Men's Basketball Coach of the Year. The team was 16-13 his final season, with a four-year record of 49–64.

In March 2004, NCCU announced that they were not renewing Spence's contract. NCCU athletics director William Hayes said, "We appreciate the service and dedication that Phil has given to the men's basketball program at NCCU during the past four seasons. At this time, however, we feel we need to head in a new direction."

== Personal life and death ==
Spence was married to Paula. They had two daughters, Porche and Pauletta.

In December 2001, Spence had a mild stroke and was hospitalized. After his stroke, he changed his diet, lost weight, and tried to reduce his stress levels. Spence also used his platform of the 2002 Central Intercollegiate Athletic Association Men's Basketball tournament to talk to others about reducing the risk of stroke and to offer health screenings. He said, "I think everything happens for a reason."

On Sunday mornings, Spence and his former North Carolina State teammates shared their version of church via text. David Thompson, called "Deacon David," starts the service videos of gospel songs. Spence texts "an informal worship service" and Tommy Burleson or "Pastor Tommy" sends a devotional. Dwight Johnson also participated until his death in 2019.

Spence died on September 21, 2026, at the age of 72.

== Awards and honors ==
- NC State Athletic Hall of Fame as part of the 1974 Men's Basketball Team, 2016
- Central Intercollegiate Athletic Association Men's Basketball Coach of the Year, 2003
- A.M. Witherspoon Award for Academic Excellence, North Carolina State University, 1996
- Wake County Coach of the Year, 1991 and 1992
- Tri-6 Conference Coach of the Year, 1991 and 1992
- Collegiate Collection North Carolina State's Finest Trading Cards #46, #47, and #48, 1989
- North Carolina State Playing Cards, eight of hearts, 1973-1974
- National Junior College Athletic Association All American, 1973
- Wake County Player of the Year, 1972
- Converse All-American, 1972
