= 1973–74 Idaho Vandals men's basketball team =

American college basketball season

1973–74 Idaho Vandals men's basketball
- Conference: Big Sky Conference
- Record: 12–14 (5–9 Big Sky)
- Head coach: Wayne Anderson (8th season)
- Assistant coach: Dale James
- Home arena: Memorial Gymnasium

1973–74 Big Sky men's basketball standings
	Conf.				Overall
Team	W		L	PCT	W		L	PCT
Idaho State †	11	–	3	.786	20	–	8	.714
Montana	11	–	3	.786	19	–	8	.704
Weber State	8	–	6	.571	14	–	12	.538
Gonzaga	7	–	7	.500	13	–	13	.500
Boise State	6	–	8	.429	12	–	14	.462
Idaho	5	–	9	.357	12	–	14	.462
Montana State	5	–	9	.357	11	–	15	.423
Northern Arizona	3	–	11	.214	3	–	18	.143
† One-game playoff winner

The 1973–74 Idaho Vandals men's basketball team represented the University of Idaho during the 1973–74 NCAA Division I men's basketball season. Members of the Big Sky Conference, the Vandals were led by eighth-year head coach Wayne Anderson and played their home games on campus at the Memorial Gymnasium in Moscow, Idaho. They were 12–14 overall and 5–9 in conference play.

No Vandals were named to the all-conference team; senior forward Steve Ton, senior guard Tyrone Fitzpatrick, and sophomore guard Steve Weist were honorable mention.

Anderson resigned shortly after the season, ending seventeen years in coaching at his alma mater. He returned to Moscow in 1982 and resumed duties as assistant athletic director, and retired in 1994.
