= Death penalty (NCAA) =

College sports sanction that prevents a school from fielding a team in a given sport

The death penalty is the popular term for the National Collegiate Athletic Association (NCAA)'s power to ban a school from competing in a sport for at least one year. This colloquial term compares it with capital punishment since it is the harshest penalty that an NCAA member school can receive, but in fact its effect is only temporary.

It has been implemented only five times:

1. The University of Kentucky basketball program for the 1952–53 season.
2. The basketball program at the University of Southwestern Louisiana (now the University of Louisiana at Lafayette, and athletically branded as "Louisiana") for the 1973–74 and 1974–75 seasons.
3. The Southern Methodist University football program for the 1987 season.
4. The Division II men's soccer program at Morehouse College for the 2004 and 2005 seasons.
5. The Division III men's tennis program at MacMurray College for the 2005–06 and 2006–07 seasons.

Besides those that received this so-called "death penalty" from the NCAA, some schools voluntarily dropped sports programs for extended periods of time due to high-profile scandals. The most notable examples were in 1951, when Long Island University (LIU) shut down all of its athletic programs for six years following the involvement of its men's basketball team in a point shaving scandal, and in the 1980s, when two other Division I men's basketball programs shut down after revelations of major NCAA violations – the University of San Francisco from 1982 to 1985 and Tulane University from 1985 to 1989. The next self-imposed "death penalty" by a Division I school took place in 2015, when Western Kentucky University (WKU) shut down its men's and women's swimming and diving teams due to a hazing scandal.

== Current criteria ==
The NCAA has always had the power to ban an institution from competing in a particular sport. However, in 1985, in response to rampant violations at several schools, the NCAA Council passed the "repeat violator" rule. The rule stipulates that if a second major violation occurs at any institution within five years of being on probation in the same sport or another sport, that institution can be barred from competing in the sport involved in the second violation for either one or two seasons. In cases of particularly egregious misconduct, a school can also be stripped of its right to vote at NCAA conventions for four years. The severity of the penalty led the media to dub it "the death penalty," and the nickname has persisted. However, if the NCAA finds a school has engaged in a "pattern of willful violations," it can look back to when the violations first occurred, even if they are outside the five-year window. It also still has the power to ban a school from competing in a sport without any preliminaries in cases of particularly egregious violations. However, the "repeat violator" rule gave the Infractions Committees of the various NCAA divisions specific instances where they must either bar a school from competing or explain why they chose not to do so.

== Division I programs ==
=== University of Kentucky basketball, 1952 ===
On October 20, 1951, former Kentucky players Alex Groza, Ralph Beard, and Dale Barnstable were arrested for taking bribes from gamblers to shave points during the National Invitation Tournament game against the Loyola Ramblers in the 1948–49 season. This game occurred during the same year that Kentucky won their second straight NCAA title under Adolph Rupp. The arrests were linked to a wider investigation of point shaving in college basketball that initially involved the City College of New York (CCNY) but soon spread to several other major basketball powers of the day. Rupp and the university were criticized by the presiding judge, Saul Streit, for creating an atmosphere for the violations to occur and for "failing in his duty to observe the amateur rules, to build character, and to protect the morals and health of his charges". Senior center Bill Spivey, a freshman on the 1948 unit, was charged with perjury due to discrepancies between his testimony and former teammates who claimed he was involved in the scheme as well. While he was acquitted, he was barred from ever playing for the Wildcats again. NBA president Maurice Podoloff banned all players involved in the scandal from ever playing in the NBA. Spivey eventually sued the NBA in 1960, but accepted a $10,000 settlement when it became apparent that he would be too old to be a viable prospect by the time he would have gone to trial.

Following the point shaving scandal, the NCAA and Southeastern Conference opened an investigation into the Kentucky program. School officials hoped that barring Spivey from ever suiting up again would work in their favor. It was to no avail. In August 1952, the SEC barred Kentucky from conference play for the 1952–53 season. In October, in its first-ever formal enforcement action, the NCAA found that 10 Kentucky basketball players received impermissible financial aid. It also found that Rupp and his staff knew the players were ineligible and allowed them to play anyway. As punishment, the NCAA barred Kentucky's entire athletic program from postseason play for the 1952–53 academic year, and directed its basketball-playing members to boycott the Wildcats during the 1952–53 season. The latter penalty was invoked through provisions in the NCAA Constitution that required members to compete against only those schools that were compliant with NCAA rules. This effectively canceled the Wildcats' 1952–53 season and is thus reckoned as the first "death penalty."

=== University of Southwestern Louisiana basketball, 1973 ===
Southwestern Louisiana was found guilty of more than 125 violations in August 1973. Most of them involved small cash payments to players, letting players borrow coaches' and boosters' cars, letting players use university credit cards to buy gas, clothes, and other items. However, the most severe violations involved massive academic fraud. In the most egregious case, an assistant coach altered a recruit's high school transcript and forged the principal's signature. Several boosters arranged for surrogates to take college entrance exams for prospective recruits. The NCAA responded by scrubbing the Ragin' Cajuns' 1972 and 1973 NCAA Tournament appearances from the books and canceling the 1973–74 and 1974–75 seasons. To date, this is the only multi-season cancellation ever handed down to a Division I member. The NCAA Council found the violations to be so egregious that it recommended throwing Southwestern Louisiana out of the NCAA altogether, but the convention opted to strip the school of voting privileges until 1977.

=== Southern Methodist University football, 1987 ===
The SMU case was the first modern "death penalty" – that is, the first one utilized under the "repeat violator" rule. It is the only modern death penalty handed down to a Division I school.

SMU football had already been placed on three years' probation in 1985 for recruiting violations. At the time, it had been on probation seven times (including five times since 1974), more than any other school in Division I-A.

However, in 1986, SMU faced allegations by two whistleblowing players, Sean Stopperich and David Stanley, that players were still being paid. An investigation found that 21 players received approximately $61,000 in cash payments, with the assistance of athletic department staff members, from a slush fund provided by a booster. Payments ranged from $50 to $725 per month, and started only a month after SMU went on its original probation (though it later emerged that a slush fund had been maintained in one form or another since the mid-1970s). Also, SMU officials lied to NCAA officials about when the payments stopped.

While the school had assured the NCAA that players were no longer being paid, the school's board of governors, led by chairman Bill Clements, decided that the school had to honor previous commitments made to the players. Under a secret plan adopted by the board, the school would phase out the slush fund once all players that were still being paid had graduated.

As a result:

- The 1987 season was canceled; only conditioning drills (without pads) were permitted until the spring of 1988.
- All home games in 1988 were canceled. The NCAA allowed SMU to play their seven regularly scheduled away games so that other institutions would not be financially affected and so that SMU could avoid uninsurable default liabilities to those schools if its failure to uphold the contractual obligation to appear for competition was not beyond the school's control. The university ultimately chose to cancel the away games and accept the uninsured "failure to appear" liability.
- SMU's existing ban from bowl games and live television was extended to 1989, and the team's existing probation was extended to 1990, resulting in essentially two full years of lost appearance, broadcast media, and advertising sponsorship income.
- SMU lost 55 new scholarship positions over 4 years.
- The team was allowed to hire only five full-time assistant coaches instead of the typical nine.
- No off-campus recruiting was permitted until August 1988 and no paid visits could be made to campus by potential recruits until the start of the 1988–89 school year.

The infractions committee cited the need to "eliminate a program that was built on a legacy of wrongdoing, deceit and rule violations" as a factor in what is still the harshest penalty ever meted out to any major collegiate program. It also cited SMU's history of violations and the "great competitive advantage" the Mustangs had gained as a result of cheating. However, it praised SMU for cooperating fully with the investigation, as well as its stated intent to run a clean program. Had SMU not fully cooperated, it would have had its football program shut down until 1989 and would have lost its right to vote at NCAA conventions until 1990.

All recruits and players were allowed to transfer without losing eligibility, and most did. On April 11, 1987, SMU announced its football team would stay inactive for 1988 as well, citing the near-certainty that it would not have enough experienced players left to field a competitive team. Their concerns proved valid, as new coach Forrest Gregg was left with a severely undersized and underweight roster composed mostly of freshmen.

Before the "death penalty" was imposed, SMU was a successful program in college football, with a Heisman Trophy winner (Doak Walker in 1949), one national championship (from the Dickinson System in 1935) and 10 Southwest Conference (SWC) titles. The Mustangs compiled a 52–19–1 (.729) record from 1980 until 1986, including an undefeated season in 1982 led by the Pony Express backfield of future Pro Football Hall of Fame member Eric Dickerson and Craig James. The only blemish on that team's record was a tie against Arkansas, which denied the Mustangs a shot at the national championship despite being the only undefeated team in the nation.

Afterwards, players were reluctant to attend a school with a history of such major recruiting violations. In addition, the loss of 55 scholarships meant that it would be 1992 before the Mustangs were able to field a team with a full complement of scholarship players; it would be another year before it fielded a team consisting entirely of players unaffected by the scandal. Over the past 33 seasons, since resuming play in 1989, SMU has played a total of 381 regular season games, with an overall record of 136–242–3 (.361), including a record of 6–52–1 (.110) against top-25 ranked opponents. The Mustangs possess a record of 2–92 (.021) on the road against teams that went on to finish their seasons with a winning record. SMU played 62 games in which they scored 7 points or fewer, while playing only 16 games in which they surrendered 7 points or fewer, only two of which were against teams that would win more than 6 games during that season. SMU's record against teams that had a winning record for the year was 22–155–1 (.126).

The death penalty decimated the Southwest Conference's reputation and finances, contributing to the collapse of the entire conference in 1996 (which led to a major conference realignment). The collapse of the SWC was likely the nail in the coffin for the SMU program; this also negatively affected three of the Mustangs' SWC rivals, Houston, Rice and TCU, all of whom also failed to find a home in a major conference (TCU joined the Big 12 in 2012 and Houston did so in 2023). The Mustangs were in three mid-major football conferences until 2024 — the Western Athletic Conference, Conference USA, and the American Athletic Conference. SMU regained power conference status in 2024 when it joined the Atlantic Coast Conference.

Additionally, according to Yahoo Sports writer Dan Wetzel, school officials significantly increased admissions standards for all incoming athletes, effectively taking the Mustangs out of contention for the kinds of players they attracted in the 1980s.

==== Long Term ====
SMU did not have a winning season again until 1997, and its first subsequent bowl appearance occurred in 2009, 22 years after the penalty. A 2012 analysis using Abadie and Gardeazabal's synthetic control technique suggests that the long recovery was primarily driven by the institutional and economic challenges caused by the sanctions. The loss of institutional support, difficulties in recruiting, diminished fan interest, and the long-term reputational damage contributed to a sustained decline in the program's performance and stability.

The financial and cultural scars left by the death penalty not only affected their athletic program but the entire SMU community as a whole. The SMU scandal affected alumni support, student recruitment, and the university's public image. College sports scandal experts suggest that effects led NCAA officials to exercise extreme caution in applying the death penalty to other major programs, as the consequences extend far beyond the sanctioned sport and can ruin an athletic program for decades.

== Public perception ==
=== Media coverage ===
The NCAA death penalty has been the subject of significant media attention. Following its application to Southern Methodist University (SMU) in 1987, the penalty, which canceled SMU's 1987 football season and prohibited it from playing in 1988, was met with widespread media coverage and public debate.The media's portrayal of the event played a crucial role in shaping public perception of the NCAA's enforcement policies.

Public reaction to the death penalty was mixed. Some viewed it as a necessary measure to uphold the integrity of college sports, while others criticized it as excessively punitive. The lasting impact of the sanction on SMU's football program further fueled discussions about the fairness and effectiveness of such extreme penalties.

Media outlets covered the scandal leading to the death penalty, focusing on the severity of the violations and the implications for college athletics.

== Other Division I schools with serious infractions ==
The NCAA has reportedly considered imposing the sanction at least five times on other Division I schools—against Kansas basketball in 1988, Kentucky basketball in 1989, Alabama football in 2002, Penn State football in 2012, and the entire Texas Southern athletic program in 2012.

=== Kansas basketball, 1988 ===
Shortly after Kansas won a national title in 1988, the Jayhawks were found guilty of numerous NCAA violations. The NCAA had opened an investigation in 1986 after receiving a confidential tip. The most serious violations occurred in the summer of 1986, when potential Memphis State transfer Vincent Askew (who ultimately never transferred) was given cash by then-Kansas head coach Larry Brown (and three other individuals whom the NCAA considered to be boosters) for plane tickets, clothes, his grandmother's electric bill, and a no-show job. One of the three boosters, former Kansas player Mike Marshall, admitted to Sports Illustrated, but not to NCAA investigators, that he had provided small loans to several Kansas players, including Danny Manning, the centerpiece of the 1988 championship team.

When issuing its findings, the NCAA indicated that it had nearly given Kansas a death penalty; the Jayhawks basketball program was eligible for the penalty because Kansas football had been found guilty of major violations in 1983. At the time, David Berst, then NCAA enforcement director, said when asked whether the Jayhawks were eligible for the death penalty, "Kansas was on the bubble, so to speak." Brown left Kansas immediately after the championship season to become head coach of the NBA's San Antonio Spurs. The penalties ultimately issued included three years' probation and a postseason ban for the 1988–89 season, marking the first time an NCAA champion had been barred from defending its title. The committee decided against imposing a death penalty because Askew was the only athlete who was proven to have received extra benefits, and because Brown was no longer employed at Kansas.

=== Kentucky basketball, 1989 ===
In 1989, Kentucky basketball was found guilty of rampant violations of recruiting and eligibility rules. The Wildcats were facing the possibility of a death penalty after being sanctioned in 1988 for failing to cooperate with an earlier investigation. In its final report, the NCAA said that Kentucky's violations were egregious enough to warrant a death penalty. However, the NCAA said it decided against imposing a death penalty after school president David Roselle took swift action to bring the basketball program under control once the violations came to light—including forcing the resignations of head coach Eddie Sutton and athletic director Cliff Hagan, who had been a basketball star under Adolph Rupp. In its final report, the infractions committee stated:

Because of the nature of the violations found in this case, the committee seriously considered whether the regular-season schedule for the men's basketball program should be curtailed in whole or in part for one or two seasons of competition. In the judgment of the committee, the nature of the violations found would justify such a penalty. However, this case also was evaluated in the light of the university's actions to bring itself into compliance. While breakdowns occurred in the institutional control exercised over the men's basketball program within the athletics department and in the men's basketball program itself, the university's president acted forcefully to uncover all relevant information bearing on these matters and to set a proper direction for the future of the university's athletics program. The committee has credited these actions, and so the penalties, although severe, do not include any limitation on regular-season competition.

=== Alabama football, 2002 ===
Prior to 2002, Alabama football had been investigated by the NCAA three times. In 1995, the program was placed on probation for three years (later reduced to 2), required to give up 26 scholarships over a 3-year period (later reduced to 17 scholarships), and forced to forfeit 8 victories from the 1993 season after the NCAA discovered that defensive back Antonio Langham had signed with an agent after the 1992 season but remained at Alabama. Another player was charged with receiving impermissible benefits from boosters, and the school was also charged with lack of institutional control. The 1995 penalties represented the first time Alabama had ever been placed on probation. In February 1999, the NCAA investigated claims of a slush fund created by former assistant basketball coach Tyrone Beaman; ultimately the allegation was not proven, but the NCAA warned the university that severe sanctions would result if further violations occurred. May 1999 brought allegations against then-head coach Mike DuBose of improper conduct with a former secretary; DuBose initially denied the claim, only to later admit that it was true. The university paid $360,000 to settle.

In January 2001, an article in The Commercial Appeal newspaper in Memphis, Tennessee, reported that a high school head coach was paid $200,000 to direct highly prized recruit Albert Means to Alabama. The article followed online chat room comments alleging similar activities. The NCAA issued a notice to Alabama in February that it was investigating the program for violations. By August, a federal grand jury in Memphis was investigating and issued indictments against a high school coach and assistant coach for trying to "sell" a prized recruit to the highest bidder. In September, the NCAA issued a notice to Alabama confirming 11 major violations including multiple instances of recruits and assistant coaches receiving cash, vehicles and loans from boosters already known to have provided impermissible benefits, and lack of institutional control (among other charges). The university attempted to avoid NCAA sanctions by self-imposing penalties of 15 scholarships over 3 years and temporary disassociation with three boosters referenced in the allegations; however, it did not self-impose a postseason bowl ban. The NCAA ruled that the self-imposed sanctions were not harsh enough and that "these violations are some of the worst, most serious that have ever occurred", and, in February 2002, issued the following penalties:

- A ban from postseason bowl games for 2 years
- A loss of 21 scholarships over 3 years
- The requirement of the program and university to permanently disassociate from the boosters in question (or face more penalties)
- 5 years of probation

In referencing the possibility of receiving the death penalty, then-chairman of the NCAA Infractions Committee, Thomas Yeager, stated:

They were absolutely staring down the barrel of a gun, ... God forbid there's ever another appearance — ever. Should there be one — particularly within the five-year period — I don't know what's left.

=== Penn State football, 2012 ===
In 2012, Penn State was disciplined with some of the harshest sanctions that have been imposed on an NCAA member school since the SMU case—including a four-year bowl ban for the football team—for school officials' failure to report former defensive coordinator Jerry Sandusky's numerous instances of molesting children. Hours after the sanctions were announced, school president Rodney Erickson said that had Penn State not agreed to a sweeping consent decree implementing the sanctions, it would have faced a multi-year suspension of the football program without any preliminaries. Erickson subsequently told ESPN's John Barr that Penn State was facing as long as a four-year ban from play. Erickson also told ESPN's Don Van Natta that he had been prompted to start negotiations after NCAA president Mark Emmert personally told him that a majority of the NCAA leadership wanted to shut the football program down for four years.

However, NCAA Executive Committee chairman and Oregon State president Ed Ray, whose committee was charged by Emmert with designing the sanctions, told ESPN's Adam Rittenberg that while there had been considerable discussion over whether to include a death penalty as one of the sanctions, "the overwhelming position of members of both the executive committee and the Division I board was against a suspension of play." Ray "categorically" denied that Penn State had been threatened with a death penalty had it not agreed to the sanctions, saying that including it as a backup in the event of such a denial was "never even a point of discussion within either the executive committee or the Division I board." Emmert himself told ESPN's Bob Ley that the death penalty was "unequivocally on the table" as a possible sanction. However, he said that the NCAA ultimately decided against imposing one due to Penn State's swift corrective action after the scandal broke in full—including the firing of head coach Joe Paterno and the forced resignation of president Graham Spanier—as well as its full cooperation with the NCAA. "Had Penn State not been as decisive as they were," Emmert said, "I don't know what the outcome would have been, but I suspect it would have been significantly worse." He also denied that the NCAA had threatened Penn State with a death penalty had it not signed the consent decree, saying that there had been "significant confusion" about those circumstances. He did, however, say that had Penn State not accepted the consent decree, the NCAA would have launched a full-blown infractions investigation that would have had "an unknown outcome." Earlier, Emmert told Yahoo! Sports' Pat Forde that if Penn State had not agreed to the sanctions, the board would have taken action on its own, "probably with harsher penalties."

The consent decree stated that the death penalty was primarily reserved for repeat violators that had neither cooperated with the NCAA nor taken any corrective measures. It not only noted Penn State's swift corrective action, but also pointed out that the school had never been the subject of a major infractions case before. Ultimately, Penn State's bowl ban and scholarship reductions were lifted when the school won an appeal. The NCAA announced it would restore the Nittany Lions' vacated wins, making Joe Paterno once again the FBS all-time wins leader with 409 victories.

=== Texas Southern athletics, 2012 ===
In October 2012, the NCAA found Texas Southern University guilty of massive violations in 13 sports over a seven-year period from 2005 to 2012. The most serious violations—including academic fraud, illicit benefits given to student athletes, lying on the part of coaches, and lying to the NCAA about self-imposed sanctions—occurred in the football and men's basketball programs. The NCAA deemed TSU a "double repeat violator"; the Tigers had either been on probation or had violations occurring for all but six years since 1992. The NCAA seriously considered a death penalty due to the egregiousness of the violations, as well as TSU's failure to reform itself over the previous two decades. However, according to Greg Sankey, chief operating officer of the SEC and a member of the infractions committee, it decided against doing so due to cooperation from President John Rudley and Athletic Director Charles McClelland, as well as the school's corrective measures—which included firing football coach Johnnie Cole and forcing the resignation of men's basketball coach Tony Harvey. Instead, the NCAA banned TSU's men's basketball team from the 2013 postseason and banned TSU's football team from the 2013 and 2014 postseason. Earlier, TSU had vacated every game that Tiger teams had won from 2006 to 2010, and vacated all victories in football and women's soccer for the 2010–11 season.

== NCAA schools outside of Division I ==
=== Morehouse College soccer, 2003 ===
In 2000, Morehouse's part-time soccer coach, Augustine Konneh (who had lobbied to get soccer elevated to varsity status two years earlier) signed two Nigerian-born players to play for the Maroon Tigers even though they had played professionally for the Atlanta Ruckus of the A-League two years earlier. They also played a few games for Morehouse before they actually enrolled at the school. Despite obvious red flags in their applications—the players would have been only grade-school age when they supposedly enrolled at the University of Liberia, and one of them did not provide a transcript of his collegiate coursework—Morehouse admitted them. Even though the school's athletic director received word that the two players might have been ineligible, they were allowed to continue playing in the following year as well. Although Konneh was replaced as coach in 2001, numerous other violations—including a player being allowed to compete without proper paperwork—led Morehouse to cancel its own 2003 season. In November 2003, the NCAA barred Morehouse from fielding a soccer team again until 2006—in effect, extending the self-imposed cancellation for two additional seasons—the first multi-year shutdown of an athletic program since the NCAA adopted its "repeat violator" rules. It also put Morehouse on five years' probation—the longest that can be imposed under the NCAA constitution, and tied for the longest probation ever. USA Today called it the harshest penalty ever handed down to a collegiate program. The Division II infractions committee came down particularly hard on Morehouse because of a lack of institutional control; for a time the athletic department did not know the soccer program even existed. While this was Morehouse's first major infraction as an NCAA member, the NCAA felt compelled to impose the death penalty because of what it called "a complete failure" to keep the program in compliance. Soccer at Morehouse has since reverted to intramural status; school officials had planned to discontinue varsity soccer for an indefinite period even before the NCAA acted.

=== MacMurray College tennis, 2004 ===
MacMurray's men's tennis team had its 2005–06 and 2006–07 seasons canceled after part-time coach Neal Hart and his father arranged to obtain $126,000 worth of grants for 10 players from foreign countries from 2000 to 2004. Division III schools are not allowed to offer scholarships. When athletic director Bob Gay learned about the violations in 2004, he forfeited the one match the team had played that year, canceled the rest of the 2004–05 season, and self-reported the matter to the NCAA. The Division III infractions committee said that while Hart's intentions were good, he had nonetheless committed blatant violations. The committee was also angered by Hart's statements at the hearing; he referred to several NCAA rules as "a joke" and described the grant program as a "scheme". Hart said years later that he opted not to deliver a written statement before the committee, and this led him to make poor choices of words. As with Morehouse two years earlier, while this was MacMurray's first major infractions case, the NCAA felt compelled to impose the "death penalty" because of the nature of the violations. In its final report, the NCAA cited the violation of basic Division III principles, the size of the grant fund, the "significant" competitive advantage gained through the grants (though MacMurray never won more than six matches in Hart's tenure) and what it described as Hart's "cavalier attitude" toward NCAA rules.

In addition to the two-year death penalty, MacMurray was also banned from postseason play in 2008 and 2009. In fact, the tennis program never returned, as the college itself closed down in the spring of 2020. Hart was also given a four-year show-cause penalty, but it was overturned on appeal.

== Self-imposed "death penalties" ==
=== Long Island University, 1951 ===
Long Island University (LIU), now the Brooklyn-based co-flagship campus of the multi-campus LIU system, had been one of the leading men's basketball programs in the 1930s and 1940s, including NIT titles in 1939 and 1941 and two unbeaten seasons under Hall of Fame coach Clair Bee. LIU's glory days came to an end with the discovery of a massive point shaving scandal. Initially, the scandal focused on another New York City school, the City College of New York (CCNY), which had won both the NCAA and NIT in 1950. Within months, over 30 players at seven schools were implicated, including LIU star Sherman White and five other LIU players.

Of the programs involved in the scandal, LIU was one of the most affected in the long term. The school immediately shut down its entire athletic program, and did not reinstate it until 1957. When LIU athletics returned, the school joined the recently created NCAA College Division, predecessor to today's NCAA Divisions II and III; it did not move to the University Division, the predecessor to today's Division I, until the 1968–69 season.

=== University of San Francisco men's basketball, 1982 ===
Until 1982, the University of San Francisco had one of the richest traditions and highest profile programs in Division I men's basketball, boasting three national championships (in 1949, the NIT won by the Dons was still considered the more prestigious tournament), fifteen of the first thirty West Coast Conference championships, and a sixty-game winning streak from 1954 to 1956, which netted consecutive NCAA championships in 1955 and 1956 behind all-time great Bill Russell. By the 1970s, John Wooden and his UCLA Bruins had caught and eclipsed San Francisco as the premier West Coast power; nevertheless, the Dons remained an elite program well into the early 1980s, perennially ranked in the top 20, and had captured six consecutive conference titles from 1977 to 1982.

However, San Francisco's success on the court came at a price. The NCAA placed the Dons on probation twice in the late 1970s for booster/alumni interference with the program and improprieties in recruiting by coaches. Each of those NCAA investigations eventually led to the dismissal of a San Francisco head coach, leading San Francisco Chronicle sportswriter Glenn Dickey to call the program "totally out of control". In light of these and other revelations, school president Rev. John Lo Schiavo, a lifelong basketball enthusiast and an all-city power forward in his youth, let it be known after the second NCAA case was resolved in 1980 that he would shut down the high-profile program if there was any further incident.

Despite Lo Schiavo's warning, the improprieties continued. An exclusive booster organization called the Dons Century Club committed hundreds of thousands of dollars to illegal recruitment of players, paying off family members, and covering travel expenses, while other alumni were also giving or "lending" players large sums of money, paying them for no-show jobs, providing lavish gifts, as well as picking up pricey restaurant and entertainment tabs. Basketball players also continued to receive special academic treatment; many were marginal students at best, and at least one incident occurred in which a player threatened another student, and the incident was swept under the rug by school officials. It had also become commonplace for "tutors" to take tests and write papers for players. The situation finally came to a head in December 1981, when All-American guard Quintin Dailey was found guilty of assaulting a female student. During the subsequent investigation, Dailey admitted taking a no-show job for $1,000 a month at a business owned by a prominent USF booster; another booster had paid him a total of $5,000 since 1980.

True to his word, on July 29, 1982, Lo Schiavo announced that he was shutting down the basketball program—the first time a Division I university had voluntarily shut down a major sport under such circumstances. Lo Schiavo said that the Dons program "was once a source of inspiration, respect and pride for this university and city", but that the recent scandals had resulted in USF being perceived as "hypocritical or naïve or inept or duplicitous, or perhaps some combination of all those", and "All the legitimate purposes of an athletic program in an educational institution are being distorted by the athletic program as it developed". Under those circumstances, Lo Schiavo felt that the only responsible course was to shut down the program. In a prepared statement, Lo Schiavo later said, "We hope that it one day may be possible to restore a men's intercollegiate basketball team. That possibility will depend upon whether those responsible for this university are convinced that the factors that destroyed the program are not going to beset it again."

His decision made international headlines, to the degree that while visiting San Francisco in 1983, Queen Elizabeth II pulled Lo Schiavo aside to ask when he would reinstate the basketball program. Drastic as it was, the move was widely applauded by several members of the coaching fraternity.

San Francisco reinstated men's basketball in 1985, and the overzealous Dons Century Club was replaced by the Green and Gold Club, a group of boosters under the direct control of the athletic department. Since their return, the Dons have never approached the prominence they enjoyed from the 1940s to the early 1980s, mainly because Lo Schiavo significantly increased admissions standards for all student-athletes.

In a 2011 interview, Lo Schiavo reiterated that he never questioned his decision, noting that all but one trustee voted in favor of shutting down the program in 1982 "because we had to make the point that we mean what we say and we intended to be good citizens".

=== Tulane University men's basketball, 1985 ===
In March 1985, five basketball players at Tulane University, most notably star John "Hot Rod" Williams, were alleged to have been involved in a point shaving scheme. According to New Orleans prosecutors, the ringleaders of the scheme used cocaine to gain the confidence of the players. While Williams was tried on charges related to the scheme, a mistrial was declared and the presiding judge dropped all charges.

In the meantime, Tulane enlisted a law firm from outside the New Orleans area to conduct an in-house investigation. During the probe, head coach Ned Fowler and two assistants admitted to paying players. On April 4, president Eamon Kelly announced that he would recommend the permanent disbanding of the basketball program in order to "demonstrate unambiguously this academic community's intolerance of the violations and actions we have uncovered." Soon afterward, Fowler and his staff handed in their resignations. By the end of the month, Tulane athletic director Hindman Wall resigned, and the school was expelled from the Metro Conference as a result. According to Sports Illustrated, the scandal, combined with reports of academic impropriety, enraged the faculty to the point that several members wanted to drop intercollegiate athletics altogether. They were only appeased when Kelly proposed to shut down the basketball program.

Kelly was praised for his decision to abolish the program; SI's Armen Keteyian wrote that given the egregiousness of the misconduct, nothing short of "the most drastic measure" was appropriate. At the time, Kelly vowed that men's basketball would never be reinstated; when asked if there was any chance it would return, he replied, "Permanent means permanent." However, he relented in 1988 when students who wanted a return of basketball convinced him that they were effectively being punished for something that happened before they came to Tulane. The program resumed play in the 1989–90 season, with Tulane returning to the Metro.

=== Western Kentucky University swimming and diving, 2015 ===
On April 14, 2015, Western Kentucky University suspended its men's and women's swimming and diving programs for five years as a result of a self-directed Title IX investigation into allegations of hazing.

The investigation began in January 2015, when former swimmer Colin Craig told police he had been assaulted and forced to drink alcohol, even though at the time he was too young to buy or drink alcohol. He also reported incidents of hazing at a house near campus. Subsequently, police and school officials revealed numerous incidents of drug use and sexually charged hazing dating back to at least 2012. The investigation also revealed that head coach Bruce Marchionda was aware of this behavior and did nothing to prevent it, even though it violated university policies on hazing, sexual harassment and sexual misconduct. One swimmer was also charged with possession of marijuana. School president Gary Ransdell said that the investigation revealed a "pervasive" "intolerable" environment in the swim program, and the only option was to shut it down for five years. The program's return after the suspension was placed in serious doubt when WKU officials canceled all funding for the swimming and diving program in 2018 as part of larger budget cuts to the athletic department. According to the Bowling Green Daily News, the program would likely not return in 2020 unless it received "significant" outside donations.

=== Fresno Pacific men's and women's tennis ===
Self-imposed "death penalties" have not been limited to Division I members. In May 2014, NCAA Division II member Fresno Pacific University shut down its men's and women's tennis programs for the 2014–15 school year after an internal investigation revealed multiple violations of NCAA rules. The NCAA required that Fresno Pacific spend an extra year of probationary NCAA membership before becoming a full Division II member, and the school later announced that both of the tennis teams would be canceled for 2015–16 as well. Tennis was reinstated in December 2017 for the women's team and July 2020 for the men's, allowing them to restart play in 2018–19 and 2021–22 respectively.

=== Notre Dame men's swimming and diving, 2024 ===
In August 2024, the University of Notre Dame suspended its men's swimming and diving team for at least the 2024–25 academic year following an external investigation that uncovered gambling and cultural violations. Team members were permitted to enter the NCAA transfer portal, though those who were implicated by the findings were subject to NCAA penalties.
