= 1973–74 Boise State Broncos men's basketball team =

American college basketball season

1973–74 Boise State Broncos men's basketball
- Conference: Big Sky Conference
- Record: 12–14 (6–8 Big Sky)
- Head coach: Bus Connor (1st season)
- Home arena: Bronco Gymnasium

1973–74 Big Sky men's basketball standings
| | Conf. | | | | Overall |
| Team | W | | L | PCT | W | | L | PCT |
|---|---|---|---|---|---|---|---|---|
| Idaho State † | 11 | – | 3 | .786 | 20 | – | 8 | .714 |
| Montana | 11 | – | 3 | .786 | 19 | – | 8 | .704 |
| Weber State | 8 | – | 6 | .571 | 14 | – | 12 | .538 |
| Gonzaga | 7 | – | 7 | .500 | 13 | – | 13 | .500 |
| Boise State | 6 | – | 8 | .429 | 12 | – | 14 | .462 |
| Idaho | 5 | – | 9 | .357 | 12 | – | 14 | .462 |
| Montana State | 5 | – | 9 | .357 | 11 | – | 15 | .423 |
| Northern Arizona | 3 | – | 11 | .214 | 3 | – | 18 | .143 |
† One-game playoff winner

The 1973–74 Boise State Broncos men's basketball team represented Boise State College during the 1973–74 NCAA Division I men's basketball season. The Broncos were led by head coach Bus Connor, in his first full season, and played their home games on campus at Bronco Gymnasium in Boise, Idaho.

They finished the regular season at 12–14 overall, with a 6–8 record in the Big Sky Conference, fifth in the standings.

Senior guard Clyde Dickey was named to the all-conference team; junior forward George Wilson was honorable mention.

There was no conference tournament yet; it debuted two years later, and Boise State won it.
