= Neill McGeachy =

American basketball coach and college athletics administrator (1942–2018)

Biographical details
- Born: April 20, 1942; Charlotte, North Carolina, U.S.
- Died: February 9, 2018 (aged 75); Winston-Salem, North Carolina, U.S.
- Education: Lenoir–Rhyne

Coaching career (HC unless noted)

Basketball
- 1971–1973: Duke (assistant)
- 1973–1974: Duke

Administrative career (AD unless noted)
- 2002–2016: Lenoir–Rhyne

Head coaching record
- Overall: 10–16

Neill Roderick McGeachy Jr. (April 20, 1942 – February 9, 2018) was an American basketball coach and college athletics administrator. Following the resignation of Bucky Waters, McGeachy was named the Duke Blue Devils men's basketball head coach in September 1973. He had previously served as the freshman team's coach in 1971–72 and as an assistant in 1972–73. McGeachy was fired after one season at the helm, compiling a record of 10–16.

McGeachy also served as an assistant coach for the Davidson Wildcats and the Wake Forest Demon Deacons. He later returned to his alma mater, Lenoir-Rhyne University, assuming the role of athletic director in 2002. He retired in 2016 after suffering a stroke in September 2015.

McGeachy died on February 9, 2018.

== Head coaching record ==
Record table
| Season | Team | Overall | Conference | Standing | Postseason |
|---|---|---|---|---|---|
Duke Blue Devils (Atlantic Coast Conference) (1973–1974)
| 1973–74 | Duke | 10–16 | 2–10 | 7th | |
| Duke: | | 10–16 | 2–10 | | |
| Total: | | 10–16 | | | |
