= Don Knodel =

American basketball player and coach (1931–2026)

Biographical details
- Born: September 5, 1931; Hamilton, Ohio, U.S.
- Died: October 30, 2026 (aged 95); Houston, Texas, U.S.

Playing career
- 1950–1953: Miami (OH)

Coaching career (HC unless noted)
- 1955–1956: Miami (OH) (assistant)
- 1961–1966: Vanderbilt (assistant)
- 1966–1974: Rice
- 1978–1980: Houston Angels

Head coaching record
- Overall: 77–126
- Tournaments: 0–1 (NCAA)

Accomplishments and honors

Championships
- SWC regular season (1970)

Donald Richard Knodel (September 5, 1931 – October 30, 2026) was an American basketball coach and college basketball player.

== Biography ==
Knodel was born on September 5, 1931. He was the head coach at Rice University from 1966 to 1974; in 1970, the Owls won the Southwest Conference title as the best team in the season, which as of 2024 ranks as the last conference championship in basketball for the program.

Knodel died in Houston on October 30, 2026. He was 95.

== Head coaching record ==
Record table
Season	Team	Overall	Conference	Standing	Postseason
Rice Owls (Southwest Conference) (1949–1959)
1966–67	Rice	7–17	4–10	T–7th	
1967–68	Rice	8–16	6–8	6th	
1968–69	Rice	10–14	6–8	T–4th	
1969–70	Rice	14–11	10–4	1st	NCAA University Division first round
1970–71	Rice	14–12	6–8	T–5th	
1971–72	Rice	6–20	1–13	8th	
1972–73	Rice	7–19	2–12	T–7th	
1973–74	Rice	11–17	5–9	T–6th	
Rice:		77–126 (.379)	40–72 (.357)		
Total:		77–126 (.379)			
National champion Postseason invitational champion Conference regular season champion Conference regular season and conference tournament champion Division regular season champion Division regular season and conference tournament champion Conference tournament champion
