= Roy Sigler =

American athlete and coach (1928–2023)

Biographical details
- Born: December 1, 1938; Middletown, Maryland, U.S.
- Died: March 9, 2023 (aged 84); Frederick, Maryland, U.S.

Coaching career (HC unless noted)

Soccer
- 1962: Linganore HS (MD)
- 1963–1964: Bates
- 1965: WPI (freshman)
- 1966–1973: Boston University

Basketball
- 1966–1970: Boston University (freshman)
- 1970–1974: Boston University (assistant)
- 1974–1978: Boston University

Golf
- 1964–1965: Bates
- 1967–1974: Boston University

Head coaching record
- Overall: 36–66 (college basketball)

Roy William Sigler Jr. (December 1, 1938 – March 9, 2023) was an American athlete and coach who was the head men's soccer, golf, and basketball coach at Boston University.

== Athletics ==
Sigler was born on December 1, 1938, in Middletown, Maryland. He was a multi-sport athlete at Middletown High School and graduated in 1957. He earned 16 letters in soccer, track, golf, and basketball at Frostburg State Teacher's College. He was named to the All-South soccer team from 1958 to 1961 and was an All-American selection in 1961. During his senior year, he was the Western Maryland amateur golf champion and city champion of Frederick, Maryland. As a member of the track team, he set the school records in the two miles and quarter mile.

== Coaching ==
Sigler graduated from Frostburg State in 1962 and took a job at Linganore High School in Frederick, Maryland. In addition to teaching geography and physical education, he was the school's soccer and basketball coach. In 1963, he moved to the college level as the varsity soccer and golf coach at Bates College. He left the school in 1965 and spent a year as the freshman wrestling and soccer coach at Worcester Polytechnic Institute. In 1966, he became the varsity soccer and golf and freshman basketball coach at Boston University. In 1970, he became an assistant varsity basketball coach. In 1974, he was promoted to head basketball coach and gave up his duties with the soccer and golf teams. He resigned in 1978 to "pursue other career opportunities".

== Later life ==
After leaving B.U., Sigler worked as a teacher in Frederick County, Maryland for two years before becoming a life insurance salesman. He later worked for Frederick Motor Company and was a greenskeeper at the Richland Golf Course. For 27 seasons, he was the color commentator for Mount St. Mary's Mountaineers men's basketball radio broadcasts. He died on March 9, 2023, at an assisted living facility in Frederick.
