= 1973–74 Gonzaga Bulldogs men's basketball team =

American college basketball season

1973–74 Gonzaga Bulldogs men's basketball
- Conference: Big Sky Conference
- Record: 13–13 (7–7 Big Sky)
- Head coach: Adrian Buoncristiani (2nd season)
- Assistant coach: Dan Fitzgerald
- Home arena: Kennedy Pavilion

1973–74 Big Sky men's basketball standings
	Conf.				Overall
Team	W		L	PCT	W		L	PCT
Idaho State †	11	–	3	.786	20	–	8	.714
Montana	11	–	3	.786	19	–	8	.704
Weber State	8	–	6	.571	14	–	12	.538
Gonzaga	7	–	7	.500	13	–	13	.500
Boise State	6	–	8	.429	12	–	14	.462
Idaho	5	–	9	.357	12	–	14	.462
Montana State	5	–	9	.357	11	–	15	.423
Northern Arizona	3	–	11	.214	3	–	18	.143
† One-game playoff winner

The 1973–74 Gonzaga Bulldogs men's basketball team represented Gonzaga University during the 1973–74 NCAA Division I basketball season. Members of the Big Sky Conference, the Bulldogs were led by second-year head coach Adrian Buoncristiani and played their home games on campus at Kennedy Pavilion in Spokane, Washington. They were 13–13 overall and 7–7 in conference play, in fourth place.

Senior center Stewart Morrill was selected to the all-conference team and junior guard Ken Tyler was on the second team.

== Schedule ==
Date time, TV	Rank^{#}	Opponent^{#}	Result	Record	Site city, state
Dec 1, 1973*		at Whitworth	W 73–39	1–0	
Dec 5, 1973*		at Loyola Marymount	W 86–72	2–0	
Dec 8, 1973*		at Nevada	W 75–61	3–0	
Dec 10, 1973*		Washington State	L 53–57	3–1	Spokane Coliseum
Dec 12, 1973*		at Seattle University	L 69–72	3–2	
Dec 14, 1973*		at Washington	L 53–75	3–3	
Dec 17, 1973*		at Lewis-Clark State	W 87–65	4–3	
Dec 22, 1973*		at San Jose State	W 70–68	5–3	
Dec 28, 1973*		at Carroll College	W 99–73	6–3	
Jan 4, 1974		at Weber State	W 66–58	7–3	
Jan 5, 1974		at Northern Arizona	W 72–57	8–3	
Jan 11, 1974		at Montana State	L 90–101	8–4	
Jan 12, 1974		at Montana	W 69–68	9–4	
Jan 17, 1974*		at Portland State	L 63–71	9–5	
Jan 19, 1974		at Idaho	W 72–60	10–5	
Jan 25, 1974*		at Portland	L 51–69	10–6	
Jan 26, 1974*		at Seattle Pacific	L 50–51	10–7	
Feb 1, 1974		at Montana State	W 75–66	11–7	
Feb 2, 1974		at Montana	L 54–89	11–8	
Feb 8, 1974		at Idaho State	L 64–67	11–9	
Feb 9, 1974		at Boise State	L 66–73	11–10	
Feb 15, 1974		at Idaho State	L 55–77	11–11	
Feb 16, 1974		at Boise State	W 77–63	12–11	
Feb 21, 1974		at Weber State	L 61–73	12–12	
Feb 23, 1974		at Northern Arizona	L 59–63	12–13	
Mar 1, 1974		at Idaho	W 72–70	13–13	
*Non-conference game. ^{#}Rankings from AP Poll. (#) Tournament seedings in parentheses.
