= 1973–74 North Carolina Tar Heels men's basketball team =

American college basketball season

1973–74 North Carolina Tar Heels men's basketball

NIT, First Round
- Conference: Atlantic Coast Conference

Ranking
- Coaches: No. 8
- AP: No. 12
- Record: 22–6 (9–3 ACC)
- Head coach: Dean Smith (13th season)
- Assistant coaches: Bill Guthridge (7th season); Eddie Fogler (3rd season)
- Captains: Darrell Elston; Bobby Jones
- Home arena: Carmichael Auditorium

1973–74 ACC men's basketball standings
	Conf.				Overall
Team	W		L	PCT	W		L	PCT
No. 1 NC State †	12	–	0	1.000	30	–	1	.968
No. 4 Maryland	9	–	3	.750	23	–	5	.821
No. 12 North Carolina	9	–	3	.750	22	–	6	.786
Virginia	4	–	8	.333	11	–	16	.407
Clemson	3	–	9	.250	14	–	12	.538
Wake Forest	3	–	9	.250	13	–	13	.500
Duke	2	–	10	.167	10	–	16	.385
† 1974 ACC tournament winner Rankings from AP Poll

The 1973–74 North Carolina Tar Heels men's basketball team represented the University of North Carolina at Chapel Hill during the 1973–74 men's college basketball season.

== Schedule ==
Date time, TV	Rank^{#}	Opponent^{#}	Result	Record	High points	High rebounds	High assists	Site (attendance) city, state
December 1, 1973*	No. 5	vs. No. 14 Houston	W 97–74	1–0	–	–	–	Greensboro, NC
December 5, 1973*	No. 5	California	W 74–70	2–0	–	–	–	Carmichael Auditorium; Chapel Hill, NC
December 8, 1973*	No. 5	Vermont	W 103–48	3–0	–	–	–	Carmichael Auditorium; Chapel Hill, NC
December 10, 1973*	No. 5	vs. No. 10 Kentucky	W 101–84	4–0	–	–	–	Greensboro, NC
December 15, 1973*	No. 5	East Tennessee State	W 81–63	5–0	–	–	–	Carmichael Auditorium; Chapel Hill, NC
December 20, 1973*	No. 4	vs. Virginia Tech	W 83–78	6–0	–	–	–	Charlotte, NC
December 28, 1973	No. 4	at St. Thomas (FL)	W 112–72	7–0	–	–	–	
January 4, 1974*	No. 4	vs. No. 5 NC State; Big Four Tournament	L 77–78	7–1	–	–	–	Greensboro, NC
January 5, 1974*	No. 4	vs. Duke; Big Four Tournament	W 84–75	8–1	–	–	–	Greensboro, NC
January 9, 1974	No. 5	at Clemson	W 102–90	8–1 (1–0)	–	–	–	Clemson, SC
January 12, 1974	No. 5	at Virginia	W 87–75	9–1 (2–0)	–	–	–	Charlottesville, VA
January 16, 1974	No. 5	Wake Forest	W 95–78	10–1 (3–0)	–	–	–	Carmichael Auditorium; Chapel Hill, NC
January 19, 1974	No. 5	at Duke	W 73–71	11–1 (4–0)	–	–	–	Cameron Indoor Stadium; Durham, NC
January 22, 1974	No. 5	No. 3 NC State	L 80–83	11–2 (4–1)	–	–	–	Carmichael Auditorium; Chapel Hill, NC
January 26, 1974	No. 4	No. 5 Maryland	W 82–73	12–2 (5–1)	–	–	–	Carmichael Auditorium; Chapel Hill, NC
January 30, 1974	No. 4	at Wake Forest	W 77–67	13–2 (6–1)	–	–	–	Winston-Salem, NC
February 2, 1974	No. 4	Clemson	W 61–60	14–2 (7–1)	–	–	–	Carmichael Auditorium; Chapel Hill, NC
February 8, 1974*	No. 4	vs. Furman; North-South Doubleheader	W 95–60	15–2	–	–	–	Charlotte, NC
February 9, 1974*	No. 4	vs. Georgia Tech; North-South Doubleheader	W 112–70	16–2	–	–	–	Charlotte, NC
February 13, 1974	No. 4	at No. 6 Maryland	L 80–91	16–3 (7–2)	–	–	–	College Park, MD
February 16, 1974*	No. 4	vs. Florida State	W 104–85	17–3	–	–	–	Greensboro, NC
February 20, 1974*	No. 6	Miami (OH)	W 83–69	18–3	–	–	–	Carmichael Auditorium; Chapel Hill, NC
February 23, 1974	No. 6	Virginia	W 94–61	19–3 (8–2)	–	–	–	Carmichael Auditorium; Chapel Hill, NC
February 26, 1974	No. 6	at No. 1 NC State	L 72–83	19–4 (8–3)	–	–	–	Raleigh, NC
March 2, 1974	No. 4	Duke	W 96–92 ^{OT}	20–4 (9–3)	–	–	–	Carmichael Auditorium; Chapel Hill, NC
March 7, 1974*	No. 6	vs. Wake Forest; ACC tournament	W 76–62	21–4	–	–	–	Greensboro, NC
March 8, 1974*	No. 6	vs. No. 4 Maryland; ACC Tournament	L 85–105	21–5	–	–	–	Greensboro, NC
March 16, 1974*	No. 8	vs. Purdue; NIT	L 71–82	21–6	–	–	–	Madison Square Garden; New York, NY
*Non-conference game. ^{#}Rankings from AP Poll. (#) Tournament seedings in parentheses.

== Personnel ==
1973–74 North Carolina Tar Heels men's basketball team
Players
Coaches

Pos.	#	Name	Height	Weight	Year	Hometown
F		Mickey Bell	6 ft 5 in (1.96 m)	—
F		Bruce Buckley	6 ft 9 in (2.06 m)	—	Fr
F		Bill Chambers	6 ft 6 in (1.98 m)	—	So
C		Geoff Crompton	6 ft 11 in (2.11 m)	—	Fr
F		Walter Davis	6 ft 6 in (1.98 m)	—	Fr
G		Darrell Elston (C)	6 ft 4 in (1.93 m)	—	Sr
G		Dave Hanners	6 ft 0 in (1.83 m)	—
G		Ray Harrison	6 ft 2 in (1.88 m)	—
G		Ray Hite	5 ft 10 in (1.78 m)	—	Sr
G		Brad Hoffman	5 ft 10 in (1.78 m)	—
F		Bobby Jones (C)	6 ft 9 in (2.06 m)	—	Sr
G		John Kuester	6 ft 2 in (1.88 m)	—	Fr
F		Mitch Kupchak	6 ft 9 in (2.06 m)	—	So
C		Tom LaGarde	6 ft 10 in (2.08 m)	—	Fr
F		John O'Donnell	6 ft 7 in (2.01 m)	—	Sr
		Tony Shaver	—	—
		James Smith	6 ft 6 in (1.98 m)	—	Fr
F		Ed Stahl	6 ft 10 in (2.08 m)	—	Fr
		Charles Waddell	—	—

Head coach

- Dean Smith

Assistant coach(es)

- Eddie Fogler
- Bill Guthridge

Legend

- (C) Team captain
- (S) Suspended
- (I) Ineligible
- (W) Walk-on
- Injured
- Current redshirt
