= Jerry Lace =

American former coach and administrator

Biographical details
- Born: July 10, 1936 (age 90); Aurora, Illinois
- Education: MacMurray College

Coaching career (HC unless noted)

Soccer
- 1961–1962: MacMurray
- 1963: Cornell (Asst.)
- 1963–1967: Cornell

Men's basketball
- 1963–1968: Cornell (Freshmen)
- 1968–1972: Cornell

Administrative career (AD unless noted)
- 1972–1973: Cornell (Admin. Asst.)
- 1973–1987: USOC (Dir. of Ops.)
- 1987–1993: USCF (ED)
- 1993–1998: USFSA (ED)

Head coaching record
- Overall: 32–83 (basketball)

Jerry E. Lace is an American coach and administrator who was the head men's basketball and soccer coach at Cornell University and the executive director of the United States Figure Skating Association.

== Coaching ==
Lace began his coaching career in 1961 as the first intercollegiate soccer coach at MacMurray College. In 1962, he became the freshman basketball and assistant soccer coach at Cornell University. In the middle of the 1963 soccer season, he was promoted to head coach after George Patte resigned to focus on his duties as head of the physical education program. On March 22, 1968, he was promoted to head basketball coach.

On December 9, 1971, all six of Cornell's black players boycotted the team's game against Syracuse, alleging a quota system existed that only allowed three black players on the court at one time. On December 26, 1971, dean of physical education and athletics Robert Kane found that many legitimate grievances existed, but "they have been resolved by the players and Coach Lace" and four of the players returned to the team. Two of these players (Brian Wright and Carmel Stewart), quit the team before the end of the season. At the end of the season, Lace was reassigned to an administrative post in the school's department of physical education and athletics.

== Administration ==
In 1973, Lace joined the United States Olympic Committee as assistant executive director and director of operations. In 1987, he became the executive director of the United States Cycling Federation. In 1993, he was named executive director of the United States Figure Skating Association. In this role, he was responsible for all of the association's business matters, including the negotiation of sponsorship contracts, oversight of all marketing and sponsorship programs, and coordination of major events.

Lace led the USFSA during the assault of Nancy Kerrigan. On June 30, 1994, the USFSA stripped skater Tonya Harding of her 1994 U.S. Championship title and banned for life from participating in USFSA events as either skater or coach for her role in the attack. In April 1996, the USFSA announced it would no longer give The Washington Post reporter Christine Brennan media credentials due to what it perceived as biased coverage. Brennan had recently written Inside Edge, which covered a number of controversial topics in the sport, but Lace claimed that the ban was "not a reaction to Ms. Brennan's book". The USFSA reversed its decision two months later. He retired after the 1998 Winter Olympics, but remained involved with the organization as a marketing consultant. In 2001, Lace secured a venue and television coverage for A Skating Tribute: A Legacy to the 1961 U.S. World Team, a tribute to the 1961 U.S. figure skating team that was killed in a plane crash. The event was one of the first held at Madison Square Garden in the aftermath of the September 11 attacks.
