= 1973–74 Weber State Wildcats men's basketball team =

American college basketball season

1973–74 Weber State Wildcats men's basketball
- Conference: Big Sky Conference
- Record: 14–12 (8–6 Big Sky)
- Head coach: Gene Visscher (3rd season)
- Assistant coach: Neil McCarthy
- Home arena: Wildcat Gym

1973–74 Big Sky men's basketball standings
	Conf.				Overall
Team	W		L	PCT	W		L	PCT
Idaho State †	11	–	3	.786	20	–	8	.714
Montana	11	–	3	.786	19	–	8	.704
Weber State	8	–	6	.571	14	–	12	.538
Gonzaga	7	–	7	.500	13	–	13	.500
Boise State	6	–	8	.429	12	–	14	.462
Idaho	5	–	9	.357	12	–	14	.462
Montana State	5	–	9	.357	11	–	15	.423
Northern Arizona	3	–	11	.214	3	–	18	.143
† One-game playoff winner

The 1973–74 Weber State Wildcats men's basketball team represented Weber State College during the 1973–74 NCAA Division I basketball season. Members of the Big Sky Conference, the Wildcats were led by third-year head coach Gene Visscher and played their home games on campus at Wildcat Gym in Ogden, Utah. They were 14–12 overall and 8–6 in conference play.

In the previous six seasons, the Wildcats had won the conference title and advanced to the NCAA tournament; their next appearance was in 1978.

Sophomore forward Jimmie Watts was named to the all-conference team; senior forward Steve Fleming was honorable mention.
