= Earl Brown (basketball, born 1952) =

Puerto Rican basketball player (born 1952)

Earl Brown (born 23 June 1952) is a Puerto Rican former basketball player who competed in the 1972 Summer Olympics and in the 1976 Summer Olympics. He played college basketball for Lafayette as a center, and was 1973-1974 Middle Atlantic Conference Player of the Year.
