= 1973–74 Montana Grizzlies basketball team =

American college basketball season

1973–74 Montana Grizzlies men's basketball
- Conference: Big Sky Conference
- Record: 19–8 (11–3 Big Sky)
- Head coach: Jud Heathcote (3rd season)
- Assistant coach: Jim Brandenburg
- Home arena: Dahlberg Arena

1973–74 Big Sky men's basketball standings
	Conf.				Overall
Team	W		L	PCT	W		L	PCT
Idaho State †	11	–	3	.786	20	–	8	.714
Montana	11	–	3	.786	19	–	8	.704
Weber State	8	–	6	.571	14	–	12	.538
Gonzaga	7	–	7	.500	13	–	13	.500
Boise State	6	–	8	.429	12	–	14	.462
Idaho	5	–	9	.357	12	–	14	.462
Montana State	5	–	9	.357	11	–	15	.423
Northern Arizona	3	–	11	.214	3	–	18	.143
† One-game playoff winner

The 1973–74 Montana Grizzlies basketball team represented the University of Montana during the 1973–74 NCAA Division I men's basketball season. Charter members of the Big Sky Conference, the Grizzlies were led by third-year head coach Jud Heathcote and played their home games on campus at Dahlberg Arena in Missoula, Montana. They finished the regular season at 19–7, with a 11–3 conference record, tied for the regular season title with Idaho State; the Bengals won the one-game playoff in Missoula by three points.

The Big Sky conference tournament debuted two years later, in 1976.

Junior center Ken McKenzie was a unanimous selection to the all-conference team; senior guard Robin Selvig and junior swingman Eric Hays were on the second team.

== Postseason results ==
Date time, TV	Opponent	Result	Record	Site (attendance) city, state
Big Sky Playoff
Tue, March 5	Idaho State; Playoff	L 57–60	19–8	Dahlberg Arena (8,343); Missoula, Montana
*Non-conference game. ^{#}Rankings from AP Poll. (#) Tournament seedings in parentheses. All times are in Mountain time.
