= 1973–74 Connecticut Huskies men's basketball team =

American college basketball season

1973–74 Connecticut Huskies men's basketball

NIT, Quarterfinals
- Conference: Yankee Conference
- Record: 19–8 (9–3 YC)
- Head coach: Dee Rowe (5th season)
- Assistant coaches: Steven F. Bell; Dom Perno; Bob Staak
- Home arena: Hugh S. Greer Field House

1973–74 Yankee Conference men's basketball standings
	Conf.				Overall
Team	W		L	PCT	W		L	PCT
Massachusetts	11	–	1	.917	21	–	5	.808
Connecticut	9	–	3	.750	19	–	8	.704
New Hampshire	8	–	4	.667	16	–	9	.640
Rhode Island	6	–	5	.545	11	–	14	.440
Vermont	3	–	9	.250	9	–	17	.346
Boston University	2	–	9	.182	9	–	16	.360
Maine	2	–	10	.167	14	–	10	.583

The 1973–74 Connecticut Huskies men's basketball team represented the University of Connecticut in the 1973–74 collegiate men's basketball season. The Huskies completed the season with a 19–8 overall record. The Huskies were members of the Yankee Conference, where they ended the season with a 9–3 record. They made it to the quarterfinals in the 1974 National Invitation Tournament. The Huskies played their home games at Hugh S. Greer Field House in Storrs, Connecticut, and were led by fifth-year head coach Dee Rowe.

== Schedule ==
Date time, TV	Rank^{#}	Opponent^{#}	Result	Record	Site (attendance) city, state
Regular Season
12/1/1973*		Yale	W 102–88	1–0	Hugh S. Greer Field House; Storrs, CT
12/5/1973*		Holy Cross	L 85–91	1–1	Hugh S. Greer Field House; Storrs, CT
12/8/1973*		at Harvard	W 80–52	2–1	Malkin Athletic Center; Cambridge, MA
12/11/1973		at Massachusetts	L 72–79	2–2 (0–1)	Curry Hicks Cage; Amherst, MA
12/15/1973*		Manhattan	W 76–72 ^{OT}	3–2	Hugh S. Greer Field House; Storrs, CT
12/28/1973*		vs. Pittsburgh; Razorback Invitational	L 63–83	3–3	Barton Coliseum; Little Rock, AR
12/29/1973*		vs. VMI; Razorback Invitational	W 80–78	4–3	Barton Coliseum; Little Rock, AR
1/3/1974		New Hampshire	L 70–76	4–4 (0–2)	Hugh S. Greer Field House; Storrs, CT
1/7/1974*		Colgate	W 66–58	5–4	Hugh S. Greer Field House; Storrs, CT
1/10/1974*		at Syracuse; Rivalry	W 61–60	6–4	Manley Field House; Syracuse, NY
1/12/1974		Vermont	W 69–56	7–4 (1–2)	Hugh S. Greer Field House; Storrs, CT
1/16/1974*		Columbia	W 63–56	8–4	Hugh S. Greer Field House; Storrs, CT
1/19/1974		at Maine	W 79–69	9–4 (2–2)	Memorial Gymnasium; Orono, ME
1/22/1974		at Boston University	W 91–78	10–4 (3–2)	Case Gym; Boston, MA
1/26/1974		at Vermont	W 70–67	11–4 (4–2)	Patrick Gym; Burlington, VT
1/30/1974*		at Holy Cross	W 71–68	12–4	Worcester, MA
2/2/1974		Maine	W 93–71	13–4 (5–2)	Hugh S. Greer Field House; Storrs, CT
2/5/1974		at Rhode Island	L 70–80 ^{3OT}	13–5 (5–3)	Keaney Gymnasium; Kingston, RI
2/9/1974		Massachusetts	W 79–76 ^{OT}	14–5 (6–3)	Hugh S. Greer Field House; Storrs, CT
2/13/1974		at New Hampshire	W 72–62	15–5 (7–3)	Lundholm Gym; Durham, NH
2/16/1974*		at Georgetown; Rivalry	L 66–67	15–6	McDonough Gymnasium; Washington, D.C.
2/19/1974*		at Rutgers	L 82–89	15–7	College Avenue Gymnasium; New Brunswick, NJ
2/23/1974		Rhode Island	W 72–55	16–7 (8–3)	Hugh S. Greer Field House; Storrs, CT
2/26/1974*		Boston College	W 77–69	17–7	Hugh S. Greer Field House; Storrs, CT
3/2/1974		Boston University	W 94–71	18–7 (9–3)	Hugh S. Greer Field House; Storrs, CT
NIT
3/17/1974*		vs. St. John's; First Round	W 82–70	19–7	Madison Square Garden; New York, NY
3/21/1974*		vs. Boston College; Quarterfinals	L 75–76	19–8	Madison Square Garden; New York, NY
*Non-conference game. ^{#}Rankings from AP Poll. (#) Tournament seedings in parentheses. All times are in Eastern Time.

Schedule Source:
