= Ben Bluitt =

American basketball player and coach

Ben Bluitt (1924 – December 26, 2000) was an American college basketball player for Loyola University Chicago, and a coach for the University of Detroit and Cornell University. A 6'5" forward, Bluitt played a pivotal role as a star African American player for Loyola from 1947 to 1950. Bluitt and Jack Kerris were two of the top players on the 1948–49 Loyola University team that reached the 1949 NIT Championship game. Loyola lost in the final, 48–47, to the University of San Francisco.

Bluitt was a star player at Chicago's Englewood High School, and attended Loyola after leaving the Air Force. Bluitt was the first African American on Loyola's basketball team, and the Chicago Defender followed his college basketball career closely. After graduating from Loyola, Bluitt became a teacher and coach at DuSable and Farragut high schools in Chicago.

Bluitt joined the college coaching ranks in 1970 as an assistant coach at the University of Detroit. In 1974, Bluitt was hired as the head coach at Cornell, where he compiled a 45–108 record over six seasons.
