= 1973–74 Kentucky Wildcats men's basketball team =

1973–74 season of University of Kentucky men's basketball team

1973–74 Kentucky Wildcats men's basketball
- Conference: Southeastern Conference
- Record: 13–13 (9–9 SEC)
- Head coach: Joe B. Hall (2nd season)
- Assistant coaches: Dick Parsons; Boyd Grant; Jim Hatfield
- Captain: Ronnie Lyons
- Home arena: Memorial Coliseum

The 1973–74 Kentucky Wildcats men's basketball team represented the University of Kentucky during the 1973–74 college basketball season. This team would finish with the worst record of any Kentucky team coached by Joe B. Hall. Kentucky's final record was 13–13 (9–9 SEC) and they did not qualify for postseason play.

== Schedule ==
Date time, TV	Rank^{#}	Opponent^{#}	Result	Record	Site city, state
December 1* no, no	No. 10	Miami (OH)	W 81–68	1–0	Memorial Coliseum; Lexington, KY
December 3* no, no	No. 10	at No. 13 Kansas	L 63–71	1–1	Allen Fieldhouse; Lawrence, KS
December 8* no, no	No. 10	vs. No. 3 Indiana; Indiana-Kentucky rivalry	L 68–77	1–2	Freedom Hall; Louisville, KY
December 10* no, no	No. 10	vs. No. 5 North Carolina	L 84–101	1–3	Greensboro Coliseum; Greensboro, NC
December 14* no, no		Iowa	W 88–80	2–3	Iowa Fieldhouse; Iowa City, IA
December 21* no, no		Dartmouth; UK Invitational Tournament	W 102–77	3–3	Memorial Coliseum; Lexington, KY
December 22* no, no		Stanford; UK Invitation Tournament	W 78–77	4–3	Memorial Coliseum; Lexington, KY
December 29* no, no		vs. No. 3 Notre Dame	L 79–94	4–4	Freedom Hall; Louisville, KY
January 5 no, no		at LSU	L 84–95	4–5 (0–1)	LSU Assembly Center; Baton Rouge, LA
January 7 no, no		Georgia	W 80–74	5–5 (1–1)	Memorial Coliseum; Lexington, KY
January 12 no, no		Auburn	W 79–58	6–5 (2–1)	Memorial Coliseum; Lexington, KY
January 14 no, no		at Tennessee	L 54–67	6–6 (2–2)	Stokely Athletics Center; Knoxville, TN
January 19 no, no		Ole Miss	W 93–64	7–6 (3–2)	Memorial Coliseum; Lexington, KY
January 21 no, no		at No. 10 Alabama	L 77–81	7–7 (3–3)	Coleman Coliseum; Tuscaloosa, AL
January 26 no, no		at Florida	W 91–82	8–7 (4–3)	Alligator Alley; Gainesville, FL
January 28 no, no		No. 7 Vanderbilt	L 65–82	8–8 (4–4)	Memorial Coliseum; Lexington, KY
February 2 no, no		Mississippi State	W 82–70	9–8 (5–4)	Mississippi State Gymnasium; Starkville, MS
February 4 no, no		LSU	W 73–70	10–8 (6–4)	Memorial Coliseum; Lexington, KY
February 9 no, no		at Georgia	W 86–72	11–8 (7–4)	Georgia Coliseum; Athens, GA
February 11 no, no		at Auburn	L 97–99 ^{OT}	11–9 (7–5)	Auburn Coliseum; Auburn, AL
February 16 no, no		Tennessee	W 61–58	12–9 (8–5)	Memorial Coliseum; Lexington, KY
February 18 no, no		at Ole Miss	L 60–61	12–10 (8–6)	Tad Smith Coliseum; Oxford, MS
February 23 no, no		No. 8 Alabama	L 71–94	12–11 (8–7)	Memorial Coliseum; Lexington, KY
February 25 no, no		Florida	L 65–75	12–12 (8–8)	Memorial Coliseum; Lexington, KY
March 2 no, no		at No. 6 Vanderbilt	L 69–71	12–13 (8–9)	Memorial Gymnasium; Nashville, TN
March 4 no, no		Mississippi State	W 108–69	13–13 (9–9)	Memorial Coliseum; Lexington, KY
*Non-conference game. ^{#}Rankings from AP Poll. (#) Tournament seedings in parentheses.
