= 1973–74 Michigan State Spartans men's basketball team =

American college basketball season

1973–74 Michigan State Spartans men's basketball
- Conference: Big Ten Conference
- Record: 13–11 (8–6 Big Ten)
- Head coach: Gus Ganakas (5th season)
- Assistant coach: Robert Nordmann
- Captain: Mike Robinson
- Home arena: Jenison Fieldhouse

1973–74 Big Ten Conference men's basketball standings
	Conf.				Overall
Team	W		L	PCT	W		L	PCT
No. 9 Indiana	12	–	2	.857	23	–	5	.821
No. 6 Michigan	12	–	2	.857	22	–	5	.815
No. 11 Purdue	10	–	4	.714	21	–	9	.700
Wisconsin	8	–	6	.571	16	–	8	.667
Michigan State	8	–	6	.571	13	–	11	.542
Minnesota	6	–	8	.429	12	–	12	.500
Iowa	5	–	9	.357	8	–	16	.333
Ohio State	4	–	10	.286	9	–	15	.375
Northwestern	3	–	11	.214	9	–	15	.375
Illinois	2	–	12	.143	5	–	18	.217
Rankings from AP Poll

The 1973–74 Michigan State Spartans men's basketball team represented Michigan State University in the 1973–74 NCAA Division I men's basketball season as members of the Big Ten Conference. They played their home games at Jenison Fieldhouse in East Lansing, Michigan and were coached by Gus Ganakas in his fifth year as head coach of the Spartans. MSU finished the season 13–11, 8–6 in Big Ten play to finish in a tie for fourth place.

== Previous season ==
The Spartans finished the 1972–73 season 13–11, 6–8 in Big Ten play to finish in a tie for sixth place.

== Roster and statistics ==
1973–74 Michigan State Spartans men's basketball team
No	Name	Pos	Year	Height	Pts	Reb
12	William Glover	G	JR	6–2	7.0	2.2
15	Steve Borenstein	G	JR	5–10	–	–
21	David Cross	F	JR	6–5	–	–
22	Lovelle Rivers	F	JR	6–5	0.2	0.8
23	Benny White	G	SO	5–8	2.4	1.1
24	Cedric Milton	C	SO	6–9	4.7	3.4
25	Terry Furlow	F	SO	6–4	14.1	7.1
31	Mike Robinson	G	SR	5–11	22.4	2.9
32	Peter Davis	G	JR	6–1	5.4	1.2
33	Edgar Wilson	F	FR	6–4	2.7	1.6
34	Joe Shackleton	F	JR	6–2	0.3	0.1
41	Thomas McGill	F	JR	6–4	4.5	3.5
42	Brian Breslin	F	SR	6–5	4.4	2.6
44	Robert Chapman	F	FR	6–2	–	–
45	Lindsay Hairston	C	JR	6–7	16.2	13.6
–	Wayne Butler	F	FR	6–5	–	–
–	Dave Jackson	F	SO	6–4	–	–
–	Jim Shereda	C	SR	6–8	–	–
–	Kevin Vandenbussche	G	FR	6–4	–	–

== Schedule and results ==
Date time, TV	Rank^{#}	Opponent^{#}	Result	Record	Site city, state
Regular season
Dec 1, 1973*		at Central Michigan	W 78–70	1–0	Rose Arena; Mount Pleasant, MI
Dec 8, 1973*		South Carolina	L 63–74	1–1	Jenison Fieldhouse; East Lansing, MI
Dec 10, 1973*		Eastern Michigan	W 91–58	2–1	Jenison Fieldhouse; East Lansing, MI
Dec 15, 1973*		Western Michigan	W 85–76	3–1	Jenison Fieldhouse; East Lansing, MI
Dec 18, 1973*		at Toledo	L 51–79	3–2	The Field House; Toledo, OH
Dec 22, 1973*		at Detroit Mercy	L 71–73	3–3	Calihan Hall; Detroit, MI
Dec 28, 1973*		vs. Boston College; Maryland Tournament	L 81–94	3–4	College Park, MD
Dec 29, 1973*		vs. Holy Cross; Maryland Tournament	W 97–85	4–4	College Park, MD
Jan 5, 1974		at Purdue	L 75–77	4–5 (0–1)	Mackey Arena; West Lafayette, IN
Jan 12, 1974		Ohio State	W 83–75	5–5 (1–1)	Jenison Fieldhouse; East Lansing, MI
Jan 14, 1974		at Illinois	W 90–82	6–5 (2–1)	Jenison Fieldhouse; East Lansing, MI
Jan 19, 1974		at No. 14 Michigan; Rivalry	L 82–84	6–6 (2–2)	Crisler Arena; Ann Arbor, MI
Jan 21, 1974		Iowa	W 95–86	7–6 (3–2)	Jenison Fieldhouse; East Lansing, MI
Jan 26, 1974		at Minnesota	W 67–66	8–6 (4–2)	Williams Arena; Minneapolis, MN
Jan 28, 1974		Illinois	W 93–82	9–6 (5–2)	Jenison Fieldhouse; East Lansing, MI
Feb 2, 1974		Purdue	W 76–74	10–6 (6–2)	Jenison Fieldhouse; East Lansing, MI
Feb 4, 1974*		No. 3 Notre Dame	L 89–91	10–7	Jenison Fieldhouse; East Lansing, MI
Feb 11, 1974		at Ohio State	W 75–67	11–7 (7–2)	St. John Arena; Columbus, OH
Feb 16, 1974		Minnesota	L 50–56	11–8 (7–3)	Jenison Fieldhouse; East Lansing, MI
Feb 23, 1974		Northwestern	W 73–70	12–8 (8–3)	Jenison Fieldhouse; East Lansing, MI
Feb 25, 1974		at No. 10 Indiana	L 85–91	12–9 (8–4)	Assembly Hall; Bloomington, IN
Mar 2, 1974		at Wisconsin	L 80–87	12–10 (8–5)	Wisconsin Field House; Madison, WI
Mar 9, 1974		No. 16 Michigan; Rivalry	L 87–103	12–11 (8–6)	Jenison Fieldhouse; East Lansing, MI
*Non-conference game. ^{#}Rankings from AP Poll. (#) Tournament seedings in parentheses. Source

== Awards and honors ==
- Lindsay Hairston – All-Big Ten First Team
- Mike Robinson – All-Big Ten First Team

== See also ==
- 1974 in Michigan
