= National Commissioners Invitational Tournament =

US college basketball tournament

The National Commissioners Invitational Tournament was an eight-team postseason men's college basketball tournament run by the National Collegiate Athletic Association (NCAA). It was introduced in 1974 as the Collegiate Commissioners Association Tournament. Invitees were runner-up teams in major conferences, which were required to participate, creating a threat to the established National Invitation Tournament (NIT), which, at that time, the NCAA did not control. Bobby Knight, head coach of Indiana, winner of the inaugural tournament, did not want to participate, because he believed it was created to "run the NIT out of business," which he opposed. The tournament lasted only two years before being discontinued after changes to the NCAA tournament rules, which allowed more than one team per conference to participate.

== Summary ==
The tournament was won in 1974 by Indiana over USC, 85–60, in St. Louis, Missouri. The 1974 tournament featured a collection of teams that came in second in their conferences due to NCAA tournament rules at the time which only invited conference champions.

In 1975, the NCAA tournament expanded to include at-large teams, from a total of 25 to 32 teams and began inviting more than one team from some conferences rather than solely conference champions. However, the 1975 tournament, renamed the National Commissioners Invitational Tournament, was still held and was won by Drake over Arizona, 83–76, in Louisville, Kentucky.

The Commissioners Invitational Tournament was discontinued after the 1975 tournament.

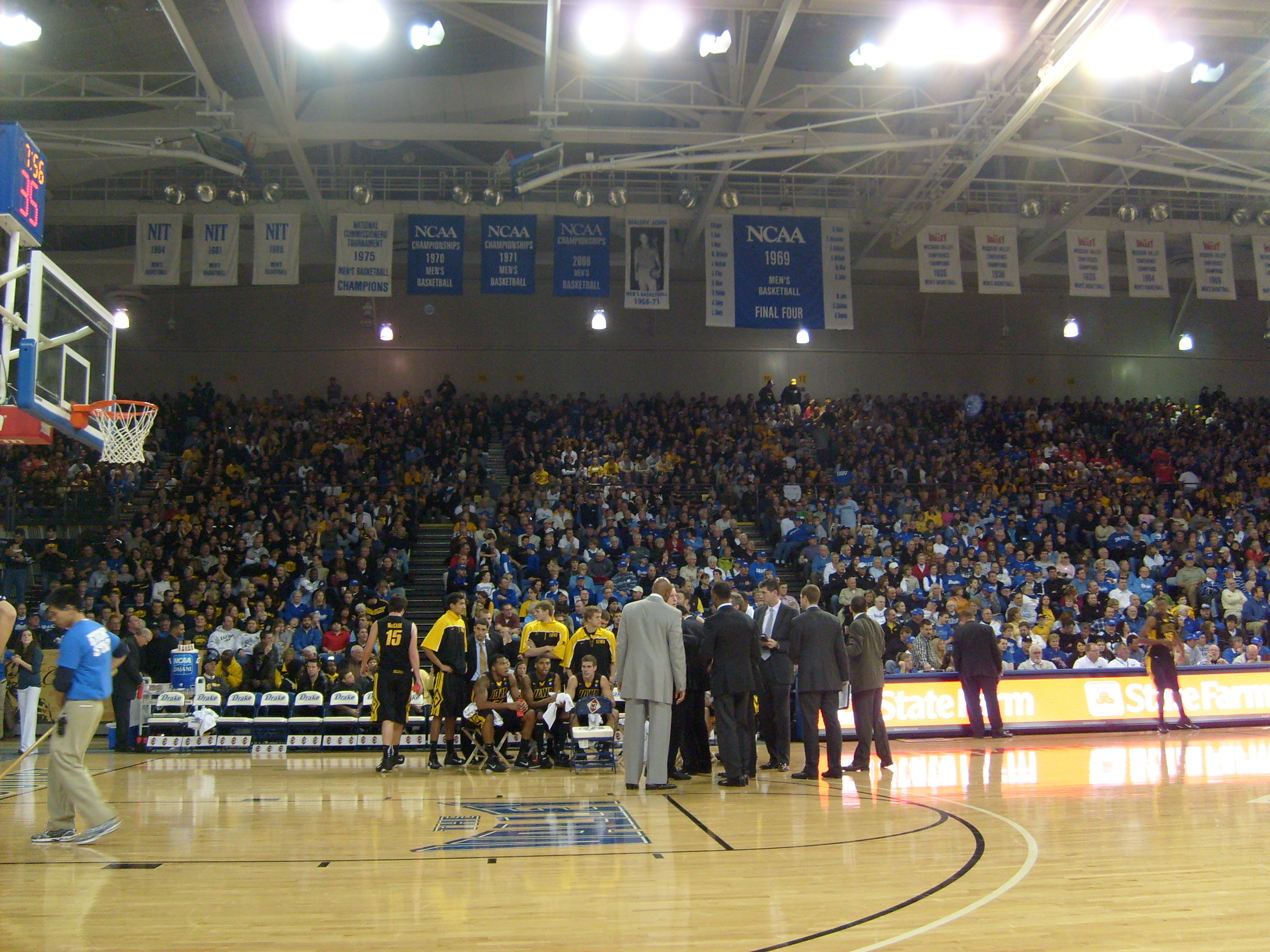
Drake's NCIT banner can be seen hanging (4th from left)

== Championships ==
Year	Champion		Runner-up		MVP	Location
1974	Indiana	85	USC	60	Kent Benson, Indiana	St. Louis, Missouri
1975	Drake	83	Arizona	76	Bob Elliott, Arizona	Louisville, Kentucky

== List of NCIT bids by school ==
This is a list of NCIT bids by school.

NCIT bids	School	Last bid	Last win	Last semifinal	Last champ. game	Last championship
2	USC	1975	1974	1974	1974	
2	Tennessee	1975				
1	Drake	1975	1975	1975	1975	1975
1	Indiana	1974	1974	1974	1974	1974
1	Arizona	1975	1975	1975	1975	
1	Bowling Green	1975	1975	1975		
1	Purdue	1975	1975	1975		
1	Bradley	1974	1974	1974		
1	Toledo	1974	1974	1974		
1	East Carolina	1975				
1	Missouri	1975				
1	Arizona State	1974				
1	Kansas State	1974				
1	SMU	1974				

The Big 8, Big Ten, MAC, Missouri Valley, Pac-8, SEC and WAC sent teams to both tournaments. The Southwest was only invited to the 1974 tournament, while the Southern Conference was only invited to the 1975 tournament.
