= 1973–74 Indiana Hoosiers men's basketball team =

American college basketball season

1973–74 Indiana Hoosiers men's basketball

Big Ten Co-Champions

Collegiate Commissioners Association Tournament, Champions
- Conference: Big Ten Conference

Ranking
- Coaches: No. 9
- AP: No. 9
- Record: 23–5 (12–2 Big Ten)
- Head coach: Bobby Knight (3rd season)
- Assistant coaches: Dave Bliss; Bob Donewald; Bob Weltlich
- Captains: Steve Green; Quinn Buckner
- Home arena: Assembly Hall

1973–74 Big Ten Conference men's basketball standings
| | Conf. | | | | Overall |
| Team | W | | L | PCT | W | | L | PCT |
|---|---|---|---|---|---|---|---|---|
| No. 9 Indiana | 12 | – | 2 | .857 | 23 | – | 5 | .821 |
| No. 6 Michigan | 12 | – | 2 | .857 | 22 | – | 5 | .815 |
| No. 11 Purdue | 10 | – | 4 | .714 | 21 | – | 9 | .700 |
| Wisconsin | 8 | – | 6 | .571 | 16 | – | 8 | .667 |
| Michigan State | 8 | – | 6 | .571 | 13 | – | 11 | .542 |
| Minnesota | 6 | – | 8 | .429 | 12 | – | 12 | .500 |
| Iowa | 5 | – | 9 | .357 | 8 | – | 16 | .333 |
| Ohio State | 4 | – | 10 | .286 | 9 | – | 15 | .375 |
| Northwestern | 3 | – | 11 | .214 | 9 | – | 15 | .375 |
| Illinois | 2 | – | 12 | .143 | 5 | – | 18 | .217 |
Rankings from AP Poll

The 1973–74 Indiana Hoosiers men's basketball team represented Indiana University. Their head coach was Bobby Knight, who was in his third year. The team played its home games in Assembly Hall in Bloomington, Indiana, and was a member of the Big Ten Conference.

The Hoosiers finished the regular season with an overall record of 23–5 and a conference record of 12–2, tying Michigan for first place in the Big Ten Conference. Due to the NCAA Tournament rules at the time, which allowed only conference champions to participate, Indiana and Michigan faced off for a third game to determine which team would go to the NCAA Tournament. IU lost to Michigan, 75–67, and thus did not participate in the tournament. Instead, the 1974 Collegiate Commissioners Association Tournament invited second-place teams from eight conferences to participate in their tournament. This was IU's only appearance in the CCAT; however, they did win the championship game.

== Roster ==
| No. | Name | Position | Ht. | Year | Hometown |
|---|---|---|---|---|---|
| 20 | Bobby Wilkerson | G/F | 6–7 | So. | Anderson, Indiana |
| 21 | Quinn Buckner | G | 6–3 | So. | Phoenix, Illinois |
| 22 | Trent Smock | F | 6–5 | So. | Richmond, Indiana |
| 23 | Craig Morris | G | 6–4 | So. | DeGraff, Ohio |
| 24 | Steve Ahlfeld | G | 6–1 | Jr. | Wabash, Indiana |
| 25 | Doug Allen | F | 6–6 | Jr. | Champaign, Illinois |
| 30 | John Kamstra | G | 6–1 | Jr. | Frankfort, Indiana |
| 31 | John Laskowski | G/F | 6–5 | Jr. | South Bend, Indiana |
| 33 | Tom Abernethy | F | 6–7 | So. | South Bend, Indiana |
| 34 | Steve Green | F | 6–7 | Jr. | Sellersburg, Indiana |
| 42 | Scott May | F | 6–7 | So. | Sandusky, Ohio |
| 43 | Don Noort | C | 6–8 | So. | Worth, Illinois |
| 45 | Jim Crews | G | 6–5 | So. | Normal, Illinois |
| 54 | Kent Benson | C | 6–11 | Fr. | New Castle, Indiana |

== Schedule and results ==
| Date time, TV | Rank^{#} | Opponent^{#} | Result | Record | Site city, state |
Regular season
| 12/1/1973* | No. 3 | The Citadel | W 74–55 | 1–0 | Assembly Hall; Bloomington, IN |
| 12/5/1973* | No. 3 | Kansas | W 72–59 | 2–0 | Assembly Hall; Bloomington, IN |
| 12/8/1973* | No. 3 | vs. No. 10 Kentucky; Indiana–Kentucky rivalry | W 77–68 | 3–0 | Freedom Hall; Louisville, KY |
| 12/11/1973* | No. 3 | No. 6 Notre Dame | L 67–73 | 3–1 | Assembly Hall; Bloomington, IN |
| 12/15/1973* | No. 3 | at Ball State | W 87–62 | 4–1 | Irving Gymnasium; Muncie, IN |
| 12/22/1973* | No. 7 | No. 15 South Carolina | W 84–71 | 5–1 | Assembly Hall; Bloomington, IN |
| 12/26/1973* | No. 7 | vs. BYU; Far West Classic Quarterfinals | W 96–52 | 6–1 | Memorial Coliseum; Portland, OR |
| 12/28/1973* | No. 7 | vs. Oregon State; Far West Classic Semifinals | L 48–61 | 6–2 | Memorial Coliseum; Portland, OR |
| 12/29/1973* | No. 7 | vs. Oregon; Far West Classic consolation round | W 56–47 | 7–2 | Memorial Coliseum; Portland, OR |
| 1/5/1974 | No. 8 | at No. 18 Michigan | L 71–73 | 7–3 (0–1) | Crisler Arena; Ann Arbor, MI |
| 1/8/1974* | No. 13 | at Miami | W 71–58 | 8–3 | Millett Hall; Oxford, OH |
| 1/12/1974 | No. 13 | No. 13 Wisconsin | W 52–51 | 9–3 (1–1) | Assembly Hall; Bloomington, IN |
| 1/14/1974 | No. 13 | Northwestern | W 72–67 | 10–3 (2–1) | Assembly Hall; Bloomington, IN |
| 1/19/1974 | No. 12 | at Iowa | W 55–51 | 11–3 (3–1) | Iowa Field House; Iowa City, IA |
| 1/26/1974 | No. 11 | at Northwestern | W 82–53 | 12–3 (4–1) | Welsh-Ryan Arena; Evanston, IL |
| 2/2/1974 | No. 12 | Iowa | W 85–50 | 13–3 (5–1) | Assembly Hall; Bloomington, IN |
| 2/9/1974 | No. 12 | Illinois; Rivalry | W 107–67 | 14–3 (6–1) | Assembly Hall; Bloomington, IN |
| 2/11/1974 | No. 12 | at Wisconsin | W 81–63 | 15–3 (7–1) | Wisconsin Field House; Madison, WI |
| 2/16/1974 | No. 12 | No. 15 Michigan | W 93–81 | 16–3 (8–1) | Assembly Hall; Bloomington, IN |
| 2/18/1974 | No. 12 | at Illinois; Rivalry | W 101–83 | 17–3 (9–1) | Assembly Hall; Champaign, IL |
| 2/23/1974 | No. 10 | at Minnesota | W 73–55 | 18–3 (10–1) | Williams Arena; Minneapolis, MN |
| 2/25/1974 | No. 10 | Michigan State | W 91–85 | 19–3 (11–1) | Assembly Hall; Bloomington, IN |
| 3/2/1974 | No. 9 | at Ohio State | L 79–85 | 19–4 (11–2) | St. John Arena; Columbus, OH |
| 3/9/1974 | No. 13 | Purdue; Rivalry | W 80–79 | 20–4 (12–2) | Assembly Hall; Bloomington, IN |
| 3/11/1974* | No. 13 | vs. No. 12 Michigan; Big Ten Conference Tie-Breaker | L 67–75 | 20–5 | Assembly Hall; Champaign, IL |
CCAT
| 3/15/1974* | No. 10 | vs. Tennessee; First Round | W 73–71 | 21–5 | St. Louis Arena; St. Louis, MO |
| 3/17/1974* | No. 10 | vs. Toledo; Semifinals | W 73–72 ^{OT} | 22–5 | St. Louis Arena; St. Louis, MO |
| 3/18/1974* | No. 10 | vs. No. 15 USC; Championship | W 85–60 | 23–5 | St. Louis Arena; St. Louis, MO |
*Non-conference game. ^{#}Rankings from AP Poll. (#) Tournament seedings in parentheses.
