= Bob Ortegel =

Biographical details
- Born: September 15, 1940 (age 86); Evanston, Illinois, U.S.

Playing career
- 1959–1962: Bradley
- Position: Forward

Coaching career (HC unless noted)
- 1963–1964: Mossville JHS (IL)
- 1964–1965: Mason City HS (IL)
- 1965–1968: Pekin HS (IL) (asst.)
- 1968–1970: Northern Michigan (asst.)
- 1970–1971: Illinois State (asst.)
- 1971–1974: Drake (asst.)
- 1974–1981: Drake

Head coaching record
- Overall: 91–103 (.469) (college)
- Tournaments: 0–1 (NIT); 3–0 (NCIT)

Accomplishments and honors

Championships
- NCIT (1975)

Robert Frank Ortegel (born September 15, 1940) was the color commentator for Dallas Mavericks television broadcasts. Ortegel had previously been head coach for Drake University's men's basketball team, leading the team to the NIT in 1981. After concluding his collegiate career at Bradley University, he began coaching at Mossville Grade School. During the school year of 1964–65 Bob was the Head Baseball and Basketball Coach at Mason City High School, Mason City, Illinois. During the mid-80s he worked in franchising for Showbiz Pizza Place, Inc.

On February 8, 2011, it was announced that he and the Mavericks would part ways after 23 years.

On January 27, 2012, the Mavericks awarded Ortegel a championship ring after their win over the Utah Jazz.

== Head coaching record ==
Record table
Season	Team	Overall	Conference	Standing	Postseason
Drake Bulldogs (Missouri Valley Conference) (1974–1981)
1974–75	Drake	19–10	9–5	3rd	NCIT Champion
1975–76	Drake	8–19	3–9	7th	
1976–77	Drake	10–17	5–7	5th	
1977–78	Drake	6–22	2–14	9th	
1978–79	Drake	15–12	8–8	T–3rd	
1979–80	Drake	15–12	6–10	7th	
1980–81	Drake	18–11	10–6	T–4th	NIT First Round
Drake:		91–103 (.469)	43–59 (.422)		
Total:		91–103 (.469)			
National champion Postseason invitational champion Conference regular season champion Conference regular season and conference tournament champion Division regular season champion Division regular season and conference tournament champion Conference tournament champion
