= Robert Dean (handballer) =

American handball player (1955–2023)

Personal information
- Full name: Robert Klein Dean
- Born: June 10, 1955 Milwaukee, Wisconsin, U.S.
- Died: April 19, 2023 (aged 67) Indianapolis, Indiana, U.S.

Sport
- Sport: Handball
National team
- Years: Team
- 1976: United States
- Football career

Profile
- Position: Defensive back

Personal information
- Listed height: 6 ft 2 in (1.88 m)
- Listed weight: 194 lb (88 kg)

Career information
- High school: Whitefish Bay (WI)
- College: Northwestern football (1974–1976); Northwestern basketball (1973–74)

Robert Klein Dean (June 10, 1955 – April 19, 2023) was an American handball player who competed in the 1976 Summer Olympics. He played college football at Northwestern.

== Basketball ==
Dean played basketball at the Whitefish Bay High School. At the season 1973–74 he played 26 games for the Northwestern University.

== Football ==
Dean played football for the Whitefish Bay High School. He played from the season 1974 until 1976 for the Northwestern University.

== Handball ==
In 1976 he placed third at the USA Team Handball Nationals with the Northwest Suburban YMCA.

In 1976, he and his brother were part of the American team which finished tenth in the Olympic tournament. He played all five matches and scored 11 goals.

== Personal life ==
Robert Dean was the identical twin brother of Randy Dean. They played all three sports at all levels together except that Randy played football at a professional level.

Dean died in Indianapolis, Indiana, on April 19, 2023, at the age of 67.

== See also ==
- Randy Dean
