= 1973–74 Michigan Wolverines men's basketball team =

American college basketball season

1973–74 Michigan Wolverines men's basketball

Big Ten regular season co-champions

NCAA tournament, Elite Eight
- Conference: Big Ten Conference

Ranking
- Coaches: No. 12
- AP: No. 6
- Record: 22–5 (12–2 Big Ten)
- Head coach: Johnny Orr
- Assistant coaches: Jim Dutcher; Bill Frieder; Richard Carter (freshman)
- MVP: Campy Russell
- Captains: Campy Russell; C. J. Kupec
- Home arena: Crisler Arena

1973–74 Big Ten Conference men's basketball standings
| | Conf. | | | | Overall |
| Team | W | | L | PCT | W | | L | PCT |
|---|---|---|---|---|---|---|---|---|
| No. 9 Indiana | 12 | – | 2 | .857 | 23 | – | 5 | .821 |
| No. 6 Michigan | 12 | – | 2 | .857 | 22 | – | 5 | .815 |
| No. 11 Purdue | 10 | – | 4 | .714 | 21 | – | 9 | .700 |
| Wisconsin | 8 | – | 6 | .571 | 16 | – | 8 | .667 |
| Michigan State | 8 | – | 6 | .571 | 13 | – | 11 | .542 |
| Minnesota | 6 | – | 8 | .429 | 12 | – | 12 | .500 |
| Iowa | 5 | – | 9 | .357 | 8 | – | 16 | .333 |
| Ohio State | 4 | – | 10 | .286 | 9 | – | 15 | .375 |
| Northwestern | 3 | – | 11 | .214 | 9 | – | 15 | .375 |
| Illinois | 2 | – | 12 | .143 | 5 | – | 18 | .217 |
Rankings from AP Poll

The 1973–74 Michigan Wolverines men's basketball team represented the University of Michigan in intercollegiate college basketball during the 1973–74 season. The team played its home games in the Crisler Arena in Ann Arbor, Michigan, and was a member of the Big Ten Conference.

Under the direction of head coach Johnny Orr, the team tied with the Indiana Hoosiers for the Big Ten championship. The team earned the first of four consecutive NCAA Division I men's basketball tournament invitations.

Campy Russell and C. J. Kupec served as team captains, with Russell earning team MVP honors. Russell, the Consensus second team All-American, earned the Big Ten scoring championship with a 24.0 average in conference games. He also won the Chicago Tribune Silver Basketball as Big Ten Most Valuable Player. Orr was named Big Ten Coach of the Year.

Although the team began the season unranked, it was in the Associated Press Top Twenty Poll for twelve of the eighteen weeks during the season, rising as high as number six, where it finished the season. The team ended the season ranked twelfth in the final UPI Coaches' Poll.

The team set a school record for single-game assists on February 23, 1974, against Purdue with 32. The record would stand until March 7, 1987.

In the 25-team 1974 NCAA Division I men's basketball tournament, Michigan reached the elite eight in the Mideast region by earning a bye and defeating the Notre Dame Fighting Irish 77–68. The team then fell to the Marquette Warriors 72–70.

== Roster ==
1973–74 Michigan Wolverines men's basketball team
| Players | Coaches |
|---|---|
| Pos. / # / Name / Height / Weight / Year / Hometown; C / 41 / C. J. Kupec / 6 ft 8 in (2.03 m) / 230 lb (104 kg) / Jr / Oak Lawn, Illinois | Head coach: Johnny Orr; Assistant coach(es) Legend: (C) Team captain; (S) Suspended; (I) Ineligible; (W) Walk-on; Injured; Current redshirt |

== Schedule ==
1973–74 Overall: 22–5 Big Ten: 12-2 (t-1st | Co-Champions) Postseason: NCAA (Mideast) (Elite Eight) Head Coach: Johnny Orr Staff: Jim Dutcher, Bill Frieder & Richard Carter (Freshmen) Captains: Campy Russell & C.J. Kupec Home Arena: Crisler Arena (13,609)

Date Rk Opponent H/A W/L Score +/-
12/1/1973 - Southern Illinois H W 86-74 +12
12/4/1973 - at Toledo A W 75-65 +10
12/8/1973 - at Detroit A L 59-70 -11
12/10/1973 - Xavier H W 77-61 +16
12/12/1973 - at Western Michigan (3OT) A W 83-76 +7
12/15/1973 - Dayton H W 76-54 +22
12/21/1973 - Yale H1 W 101-88 +13
12/22/1973 - Bowling Green H1 W 70-66 +4
12/28/1973 - San Francisco N2 W 88-66 +22
12/29/1973 - #1 UCLA A2 L 70-90 -20
1/4/1974 - #8 Indiana+ H W 73-71 +2
1/12/1974 #18 at Minnesota+ A W 66-65 +1
1/19/1974 #14 Michigan State+ H W 84-82 +2
1/21/1974 #14 at Purdue+ (OT) A L 84-85 -1
1/26/1974 #15 at Iowa+ (OT) A W 86-84 +2
1/28/1974 #15 #17 Wisconsin+ H W 83-75 +8
2/2/1974 #20 at Illinois+ A W 101-77 +24
2/9/1974 #16 Ohio State+ H W 91-68 +23
2/11/1974 #16 Northwestern+ H W 50-48 +2
2/16/1974 #15 at #12 Indiana+ A L 81-93 -12
2/23/1974 #19 Purdue+ H W 111-84 +27
2/25/1974 #19 at Wisconsin+ A W 78-74 +4
3/2/1974 #17 Minnesota+ H W 79-56 +23
3/9/1974 #16 at Michigan State+ A W 103-87 +16
3/11/1974 #16 vs. #13 Indiana N3 W 75-67 +8
3/14/1974 #12 vs. #3 Notre Dame N4 W 77-68 +9
3/16/1974 #12 vs. #7 Marquette N4 L 70-72 -2

(1) Michigan Invitational, Ann Arbor, Mich. (Crisler Arena) (2) Los Angeles Classic, Los Angeles, Calif. (Pauley Pavilion) (3) Big Ten playoff, Champaign, Ill. (Assembly Hall) (4) NCAA Tournament, Tuscaloosa, Ala. (Memorial Coliseum)

== Rankings ==
Ranking movements Legend: ██ Increase in ranking ██ Decrease in ranking
| | Week | | | | | | | | | | | | | | | | | |
| Poll | Pre | 1 | 2 | 3 | 4 | 5 | 6 | 7 | 8 | 9 | 10 | 11 | 12 | 13 | 14 | 15 | 16 | Final |
|---|---|---|---|---|---|---|---|---|---|---|---|---|---|---|---|---|---|---|
| AP Poll | | | | | | | 18 | 14 | 15 | 20 | 16 | 15 | 19 | 17 | 16 | 12 | 7 | 6 |

== Team players drafted into the NBA ==
Five players from this team were selected in the NBA draft.

| Year | Round | Pick | Overall | Player | NBA Club |
| 1974 | 1 | 8 | 8 | Campy Russell | Cleveland Cavaliers |
| 1975 | 4 | 2 | 56 | C. J. Kupec | Los Angeles Lakers |
| 1976 | 4 | 9 | 60 | Wayman Britt | Los Angeles Lakers |
| 1977 | 3 | 11 | 55 | Steve Grote | Cleveland Cavaliers |
| 1977 | 5 | 22 | 110 | John Robinson | Los Angeles Lakers |

== See also ==
- 1974 in Michigan
