= 1973–74 Wisconsin Badgers men's basketball team =

American college basketball season

1973–74 Wisconsin Badgers men's basketball
- Conference: Big Ten Conference
- Record: 16–8 (8–6 Big Ten)
- Head coach: John Powless
- Home arena: UW Fieldhouse

1973–74 Big Ten Conference men's basketball standings
	Conf.				Overall
Team	W		L	PCT	W		L	PCT
No. 9 Indiana	12	–	2	.857	23	–	5	.821
No. 6 Michigan	12	–	2	.857	22	–	5	.815
No. 11 Purdue	10	–	4	.714	21	–	9	.700
Wisconsin	8	–	6	.571	16	–	8	.667
Michigan State	8	–	6	.571	13	–	11	.542
Minnesota	6	–	8	.429	12	–	12	.500
Iowa	5	–	9	.357	8	–	16	.333
Ohio State	4	–	10	.286	9	–	15	.375
Northwestern	3	–	11	.214	9	–	15	.375
Illinois	2	–	12	.143	5	–	18	.217
Rankings from AP Poll

The 1973–74 Wisconsin Badgers men's basketball team represented University of Wisconsin–Madison. The head coach was John Powless, coaching his sixth season with the Badgers. The team played their home games at the UW Fieldhouse in Madison, Wisconsin and was a member of the Big Ten Conference.

== Roster ==
1973–74 Wisconsin Badgers men's basketball team
Players	Coaches
Gary Anderson SR G 6-5 13.5 Pts, 3.8 Reb Dale Koehler SO F 6-8 12.6 Pts, 8.1 Reb Kerry Hughes SR F 6-11 10.6 Pts, 9.2 Reb Marcus McCoy JR F 6-5 8.3 Pts, 3.9 Reb Lamont Weaver SR G 6-1 7.3 Pts, 2.3 Reb Bruce McCauley JR G 6-3 3.9 Pts, 1.2 Reb Rick Piecenza JR F 6-6 3.4 Pts, 2.0 Reb Bob Luchsinger JR F 6-3 2.4 Pts, 0.3 Reb Steve Wilhelm SR F 6-6 1.2 Pts, 0.7 Reb Jim Czajkowski FR G 6-5 1.3 Pts, 0.3 Reb Tom Agardy FR C 6-11 Pete Brey FR F 6-7 Buddy Faurole FR 6-5 John Lenahan FR 6-8 Mark Lotzer SO 5-11: Pos. / # / Name / Height / Weight / Year / Hometown; F / 45 / Kim Hughes / 6 ft 11 in (2.11 m) / 218 lb (99 kg) / RS Jr / Freeport, Illinois	Head coach: John Powless; Assistant coach(es) Legend: (C) Team captain; (S) Suspended; (I) Ineligible; (W) Walk-on; Injured; Current redshirt

== Schedule ==
Date time, TV	Rank^{#}	Opponent^{#}	Result	Record	Site city, state
Regular Season
12/01/1973*		Rollins	W 77–55	1–0	UW Fieldhouse; Madison, WI
12/03/1973*		California-Davis	W 97–53	2–0	UW Fieldhouse; Madison, WI
12/08/1973*		North Dakota State	W 88–60	3–0	UW Fieldhouse; Madison, WI
12/15/1973*		DePauw	W 92–51	4–0	UW Fieldhouse; Madison, WI
12/19/1973*		at West Virginia	W 69–62	5–0	WVU Coliseum; Morgantown, WV
12/22/1973*		UW-Milwaukee	W 73–46	6–0	UW Fieldhouse; Madison, WI
12/28/1973*		vs. Southern Methodist; Milwaukee Classic	W 74–73	7–0	Milwaukee Arena; Milwaukee, WI
12/29/1973*		vs. No. 6 Marquette; Milwaukee Classic	L 48–49 ^{OT}	7–1	Milwaukee Arena; Milwaukee, WI
1/05/1974	No. 17	Northwestern	W 87–53	8–1 (1–0)	UW Fieldhouse; Madison, WI
1/09/1974*	No. 14	Ohio	W 69–68	9–1	UW Fieldhouse; Madison, WI
1/12/1974	No. 14	at No. 13T Indiana	L 51–52	9–2 (1–1)	Assembly Hall; Bloomington, IN
1/19/1974	No. 19	Illinois	W 101–80	10–2 (2–1)	UW Fieldhouse; Madison, WI
1/26/1974	No. 17	Ohio State	W 69–64	11–2 (3–1)	UW Fieldhouse; Madison, WI
1/28/1974	No. 16	at No. 20 Michigan	L 75–83	11–3 (3–2)	Crisler Center; Ann Arbor, MI
2/02/1974	No. 16	at Minnesota	L 63–64 ^{OT}	11–4 (3–3)	Williams Arena; Minneapolis, MN
2/05/1974*		at No. 6 Marquette	L 58–59	11–5	Marquette Gymnasium; Milwaukee, WI
2/09/1974		Iowa	W 113–87	12–5 (4–3)	UW Fieldhouse; Madison, WI
2/11/1974		No. 12 Indiana	L 63–81	12–6 (4–4)	UW Fieldhouse; Madison, WI
2/16/1974		at Purdue	L 80–107	12–7 (4–5)	Mackey Arena; West Lafayette, IN
2/23/1974		at Ohio State	W 68–56	13–7 (5–5)	St. John Arena; Columbus, OH
2/25/1974		No. 17 Michigan	L 74–79	13–8 (5–6)	UW Fieldhouse; Madison, WI
3/02/1974		Michigan State	W 87–80	14–8 (6–6)	UW Fieldhouse; Madison, WI
3/04/1974		at Iowa	W 74–58	15–8 (7–6)	Iowa Field House; Iowa City, IA
3/09/1974		at Northwestern	W 77–62	16–8 (8–6)	Welsh-Ryan Arena; Evanston, IL
*Non-conference game. ^{#}Rankings from AP Poll. (#) Tournament seedings in parentheses.
