= Randy Dean =

American handball and football player (born 1955)

Personal information
- Full name: Randolph Hume Dean
- Nationality: United States
- Born: June 10, 1955 (age 71) Milwaukee, Wisconsin, U.S.

Sport
- Sport: Handball
National team
- Years: Team
- 1976: United States
- Basketball career

Career information
- High school: Whitefish Bay (WI)
- College: Northwestern (1973–1974)
- Coaching career: 2005–2008

Career history

Coaching
- 2005–2006: University School of Milwaukee Football career

No. 15
- Position: Quarterback

Personal information
- Listed height: 6 ft 3 in (1.91 m)
- Listed weight: 195 lb (88 kg)

Career information
- High school: Whitefish Bay (WI)
- College: Northwestern
- NFL draft: 1977: 5th round, 117th overall pick

Career history
- New York Giants (1977–1979); Green Bay Packers (1980)*
- * Offseason or practice squad member only

Career NFL statistics
- Passing attempts: 65
- Passing completions: 30
- Completion percentage: 46.2%
- TD–INT: 1–5
- Passing yards: 279
- Passer rating: 31.5
- Stats at Pro Football Reference

Randolph Hume Dean (born June 10, 1955) is an American former professional football player who was a quarterback for three seasons with the New York Giants of the National Football League (NFL) from 1977 to 1979. He played college football for the Northwestern Wildcats. He is also a former handball player for the American team who competed in the 1976 Summer Olympics.

== Family ==
He has an identical twin brother named Robert Dean.

== Basketball ==
He played basketball at Whitefish Bay High School. During the 1973-74 season he played three games for Northwestern University.

== Football ==
In 1972, he was named 1st Team All-Star for the Whitefish Bay High School. He played from the season 1974 until 1976 for the Northwestern University. He was punter for all three seasons and starting quarterback for his junior and senior season.

=== Professional career ===
==== New York Giants ====
In 1977 he was selected by the New York Giants in round five as 117th overall draft.

In his short stint as a quarterback for the New York Giants, he completed a 1-yard touchdown pass in 1978.

==== Green Bay Packers ====
On August 4, 1980, the New York Giants traded him to the Green Bay Packers for a future draft pick. Three weeks later, on August 26, 1980, the Packers cut him

== Handball ==
In 1975 he won the USA Team Handball Nationals with the Northwest Suburban YMCA.

In 1976 he placed third at the USA Team Handball Nationals with the Northwest Suburban YMCA.

In 1976, he and his brother were part of the American team which finished tenth in the Olympic tournament. He played all five matches and scored 24 goals.

== After retirement ==
Between 1997 and 2002, he was Director of Development at the University School of Milwaukee. From 2002 to 2007, he was the Athletic Director. Between 2005 and 2008, he coached the boys basketball team.

In 2008, he became the Executive Director of the Pettit National Ice Center in Milwaukee.

== See also ==
- List of New York Giants players
- List of National Football League Olympians
- Robert Dean
