= 1974 Collegiate Commissioners Association Tournament =

College basketball postseason tournament

- Season: 1973–74
- Teams: 8
- Finals site: St. Louis Arena, St. Louis, Missouri
- Champions: Indiana (1st title)
- Runner-up: USC (1st title game)
- Semifinalists: Toledo (1st semifinal); Bradley (1st semifinal)
- Winning coach: Bob Knight (1st title)
- MVP: Kent Benson (Indiana)

The 1974 Collegiate Commissioners Association Tournament was a single-elimination tournament of eight National Collegiate Athletic Association (NCAA) Division I teams that did not participate in the 1974 NCAA Men's Division I Basketball Tournament or 1974 National Invitation Tournament. It was run by the NCAA to offer berths to highly regarded conference runners-up in an effort to kill the NIT. All games were played at St. Louis Arena in St. Louis, Missouri. Indiana defeated Tennessee, Toledo, and Southern California in that order to win the championship. Kent Benson of Indiana was named tournament MVP.

== Brackets ==
First Round
Indiana	73
Tennessee	71
Arizona State	74
Toledo	81
Bradley	68
Kansas State	64
SMU	70
USC	82

Semifinals
Indiana	73
Toledo	72
Bradley	73
USC	76

Finals
Indiana	85
USC	60
