= 1973–74 Purdue Boilermakers men's basketball team =

American college basketball season

1973–74 Purdue Boilermakers men's basketball

NIT Champions
- Conference: Big Ten

Ranking
- AP: No. 11
- Record: 21–9 (10–4 Big Ten)
- Head coach: Fred Schaus (2nd season)
- Assistant coaches: Joe Sexson (14th season); Bob King (13th season); George Faerber (2nd season)
- Captains: Frank Kendrick; John Garrett
- Home arena: Mackey Arena

1973–74 Big Ten Conference men's basketball standings
	Conf.				Overall
Team	W		L	PCT	W		L	PCT
No. 9 Indiana	12	–	2	.857	23	–	5	.821
No. 6 Michigan	12	–	2	.857	22	–	5	.815
No. 11 Purdue	10	–	4	.714	21	–	9	.700
Wisconsin	8	–	6	.571	16	–	8	.667
Michigan State	8	–	6	.571	13	–	11	.542
Minnesota	6	–	8	.429	12	–	12	.500
Iowa	5	–	9	.357	8	–	16	.333
Ohio State	4	–	10	.286	9	–	15	.375
Northwestern	3	–	11	.214	9	–	15	.375
Illinois	2	–	12	.143	5	–	18	.217
Rankings from AP Poll

The 1973–74 Purdue Boilermakers men's basketball team represented Purdue University during the 1973–74 college basketball season. They finished the regular season with a record of 17–9 and received an invitation to the 1974 National Invitation Tournament, where they won the championship.

== Roster ==
1973–74 Purdue Boilermakers men's basketball team
Players
Coaches

Pos.	#	Name	Height	Weight	Year	Hometown
C	55	John Garrett (C)	6 ft 11 in (2.11 m)	233 lb (106 kg)	Jr	Peru, Indiana
F	34	Frank Kendrick (C)	6 ft 6 in (1.98 m)	195 lb (88 kg)	Sr	Indianapolis, Indiana
G	20	Bruce Parkinson	6 ft 2 in (1.88 m)	175 lb (79 kg)	So	Yorktown, Indiana
F	25	Jerry Nichols	6 ft 6 in (1.98 m)	175 lb (79 kg)	Jr	Greenwood, Indiana
F	33	Bruce Rose	6 ft 6 in (1.98 m)	225 lb (102 kg)	Sr	Kokomo, Indiana
C	32	Tom Scheffler	6 ft 11 in (2.11 m)	220 lb (100 kg)	Fr	St. Joseph, Michigan
G	11	Dave Luke	6 ft 1 in (1.85 m)	175 lb (79 kg)	Sr	Cincinnati, Ohio
F	41	Mike Steele	6 ft 4 in (1.93 m)	160 lb (73 kg)	So	Robinson, Illinois
G	15	Dick Satterfield	6 ft 1 in (1.85 m)	160 lb (73 kg)	Jr	Hagerstown, Indiana
G	30	Pat Manahan	6 ft 5 in (1.96 m)	180 lb (82 kg)	So	Delphi, Indiana
F	23	Rob McCarter	6 ft 8 in (2.03 m)	210 lb (95 kg)	Fr	Robinson, Illinois
F	31	Gerald Thomas	6 ft 7 in (2.01 m)	190 lb (86 kg)	Fr	Connersville, Indiana
F	42	Randall Shields	6 ft 6 in (1.98 m)	205 lb (93 kg)	Sr	Milwaukee, Wisconsin
G	21	Tom Gilbert	6 ft 3 in (1.91 m)	175 lb (79 kg)	Sr	Speedway, Indiana
C	35	Dan McDermott	7 ft 0 in (2.13 m)	240 lb (109 kg)	Fr	St. Louis, Missouri

Head coach

Fred Schaus (West Virginia)

Assistant coach(es)

Joe Sexson (Purdue)
Bob King (Butler)
George Faerber (Purdue)

Legend

- (C) Team captain
- (S) Suspended
- (I) Ineligible
- (W) Walk-on
- Injured
- Current redshirt

Roster

- Starting Lineup: F Frank Kendrick, F Jerry Nichols, C John Garrett, G Bruce Parkinson, G Dave Luke.

== Schedule and results ==
Date time, TV	Rank^{#}	Opponent^{#}	Result	Record	Site city, state
December 1*		SIU Edwardsville	W 117–71	1–0	Mackey Arena; West Lafayette, IN
December 3*		St. Joseph's (IN)	W 103–81	2–0	Mackey Arena; West Lafayette, IN
December 5*		Clemson	L 80–81 ^{OT}	2–1	Mackey Arena; West Lafayette, IN
December 8*		at Miami (OH)	L 85–86 ^{OT}	2–2	Millett Hall; Oxford, OH
December 11*		Missouri	W 79–66	3–2	Mackey Arena; West Lafayette, IN
December 14*		at Indiana State	W 81–69	4–2	Hulman Center; Terre Haute, IN
December 22*		Illinois State	W 114–85	5–2	Mackey Arena; West Lafayette, IN
December 27*		vs. No. 9 Providence; Rainbow Classic	W 93–85	6–2	Neal S. Blaisdell Center; Honolulu, HI
December 29*		at Hawaii; Rainbow Classic	L 67–76	6–3	Neal S. Blaisdell Center; Honolulu, HI
January 1*		at Utah	L 85–87	6–4	Jon M. Huntsman Center; Salt Lake City, UT
January 5		Michigan State	W 77–75 ^{OT}	7–4 (1–0)	Mackey Arena; West Lafayette, IN
January 7		at Northwestern	W 85–78	8–4 (2–0)	Welsh–Ryan Arena; Evanston, IL
January 12		at Illinois	W 91–69	9–4 (3–0)	Assembly Hall; Champaign, IL
January 14		Northwestern	W 89–76	10–4 (4–0)	Mackey Arena; West Lafayette, IN
January 21		No. 14 Michigan	W 85–84 ^{OT}	11–4 (5–0)	Mackey Arena; West Lafayette, IN
January 26*		No. 3 NC State	L 81–86	11–5	Mackey Arena; West Lafayette, IN
January 28		at Ohio State	W 67–65	12–5 (6–0)	St. John Arena; Columbus, OH
February 2		at Michigan State	L 74–76	12–6 (6–1)	Jenison Fieldhouse; East Lansing, MI
February 9		Minnesota	W 64–45	13–6 (7–1)	Mackey Arena; West Lafayette, IN
February 11		at Iowa	L 111–112 ^{3OT}	13–7 (7–2)	Iowa Field House; Iowa City, IA
February 16		Wisconsin	W 107–80	14–7 (8–2)	Mackey Arena; West Lafayette, IN
February 18		Iowa	W 99–78	15–7 (9–2)	Mackey Arena; West Lafayette, IN
February 23		at No. 19 Michigan	L 84–111	15–8 (9–3)	Crisler Arena; Ann Arbor, MI
February 26*		Bowling Green	W 99–83	16–8	Mackey Arena; West Lafayette, IN
March 2		Illinois	W 94–83	17–8 (10–3)	Mackey Arena; West Lafayette, IN
March 9		at No. 13 Indiana; Rivalry	L 79–80	17–9 (10–4)	Assembly Hall; Bloomington, IN
NIT Tournament
March 16*		vs. No. 8 North Carolina; First Round	W 82–71	18–9	Madison Square Garden; New York, NY
March 19*	No. 18	vs. Hawaii; Quarterfinals	W 85–72	19–9	Madison Square Garden; New York, NY
March 23*	No. 18	vs. Jacksonville; Semifinals	W 78–63	20–9	Madison Square Garden; New York, NY
March 24*	No. 18	vs. Utah; Finals	W 87–81	21–9	Madison Square Garden; New York, NY
*Non-conference game. ^{#}Rankings from AP Poll. (#) Tournament seedings in parentheses.

== Rankings ==
Ranking movements Legend: ██ Increase in ranking ██ Decrease in ranking
	Week																	
Poll	Pre	1	2	3	4	5	6	7	8	9	10	11	12	13	14	15	16	Final
AP Poll																	18	11
