= 1973–74 Illinois Fighting Illini men's basketball team =

American college basketball season

1973–74 Illinois Fighting Illini men's basketball
- Conference: Big Ten Conference
- Record: 5–18 (2–12 Big Ten)
- Head coach: Harv Schmidt (7th season)
- Assistant coaches: Dick Campbell (7th season); Marshall Stoner (2nd season); Jodie Harrison/Bob Brown (1st season)
- MVP: Rick Schmidt
- Captain: Jeff Dawson
- Home arena: Assembly Hall

1973–74 Big Ten Conference men's basketball standings
	Conf.				Overall
Team	W		L	PCT	W		L	PCT
No. 9 Indiana	12	–	2	.857	23	–	5	.821
No. 6 Michigan	12	–	2	.857	22	–	5	.815
No. 11 Purdue	10	–	4	.714	21	–	9	.700
Wisconsin	8	–	6	.571	16	–	8	.667
Michigan State	8	–	6	.571	13	–	11	.542
Minnesota	6	–	8	.429	12	–	12	.500
Iowa	5	–	9	.357	8	–	16	.333
Ohio State	4	–	10	.286	9	–	15	.375
Northwestern	3	–	11	.214	9	–	15	.375
Illinois	2	–	12	.143	5	–	18	.217
Rankings from AP Poll

The 1973–74 Illinois Fighting Illini men's basketball team represented the University of Illinois.

== Regular season ==
The 1973-74 Fighting Illini men's basketball team had done something that no other Illinois team in history had accomplished, finishing last in the Big Ten, tenth place. In the history of the school, Illinois has only had one worse finish, the 1998-99 season, where they ended the year in eleventh place. However, the 1998-99 team played for the Big Ten tournament championship, losing to Michigan State in the championship game.

The 1973-74 season also witnessed the conclusion of a very difficult tenure at the position of head coach. Harv Schmidt, a former player turned head coach, finished his seventh season at Illinois with an overall record of 89 wins and 77 losses. Unfortunately for Schmidt, several situations contributed to his demise, most of the problems being not of his doing. He was a disciplinarian and demanded attention to detail. He worked his players hard yet he was fair and considerate of their needs. Schmidt had high expectations from his team and set a good example by working as hard as he expected his players to work.

=== Roster ===
1973–74 Illinois Fighting Illini men's basketball team
Players
Coaches

Pos.	#	Name	Height	Weight	Year	Previous school	Hometown
G	10	Garvin Roberson	6 ft 4 in (1.93 m)	190 lb (86 kg)	Sr	Elkhart Central High School	Elkhart, Indiana
G	11	Dave Roberts	6 ft 2 in (1.88 m)	175 lb (79 kg)	Jr	Proviso East High School	Maywood, Illinois
G	14	C.J. Schroeder	6 ft 4 in (1.93 m)	195 lb (88 kg)	Sr	Davenport West High School	Davenport, Iowa
C	15	Tom Carmichael	6 ft 7 in (2.01 m)	200 lb (91 kg)	Jr	Rochelle Township High School	Rochelle, Illinois
G	20	Dennis Graff	6 ft 1 in (1.85 m)	170 lb (77 kg)	So	Gibson City High School	Gibson City, Illinois
G	22	Howie Johnson	6 ft 2 in (1.88 m)	165 lb (75 kg)	Fr	Marshall High School	Marshall, Illinois
G	24	Jeff Dawson (C)	6 ft 1 in (1.85 m)	175 lb (79 kg)	Sr	Downers Grove North High School	Oak Park, Illinois
G	25	Donn Deputy	6 ft 4 in (1.93 m)	185 lb (84 kg)	Sr	Pekin High School	Pekin, Illinois
F	30	Mike Wente	6 ft 6 in (1.98 m)	200 lb (91 kg)	Sr	St. Anthony High School	Effingham, Illinois
F	31	Mark Bondeson	6 ft 6 in (1.98 m)	180 lb (82 kg)	So	Maine East High School	Des Plaines, Illinois
F	32	Rick Schmidt	6 ft 6 in (1.98 m)	205 lb (93 kg)	Jr	St. Joseph-Ogden High School	Royal, Illinois
G	33	Otho Tucker	6 ft 6 in (1.98 m)	200 lb (91 kg)	Jr	Paris High School	Paris, Illinois
F/C	41	Dave Smith	6 ft 7 in (2.01 m)	200 lb (91 kg)	So	Hinsdale Central High School	Clarendon Hills, Illinois
G/F	42	Tim Bushell	6 ft 6 in (1.98 m)	185 lb (84 kg)	Fr	Lincoln Community High School	Lincoln, Illinois
F	43	Brad Farnham	6 ft 6 in (1.98 m)	190 lb (86 kg)	Fr	Paris High School	Paris, Illinois
C	53	Bill Rucks	7 ft 0 in (2.13 m)	250 lb (113 kg)	So	Waukegan High School	Waukegan, Illinois
C	54	Mike Dempsey	6 ft 8 in (2.03 m)	195 lb (88 kg)	Fr	Moline High School	Moline, Illinois

Head coach

- Harv Schmidt (University of Illinois) (7th year)

Assistant coach(es)

- Dick Campbell (7th year)
- Marshall Stoner (Western Illinois University) (2nd year)
- Jodie Harrison (University of Illinois) (1st year)
- Bob Brown (University of Illinois) (1st year)

Legend

- (C) Team captain
- (S) Suspended
- (I) Ineligible
- (W) Walk-on
- Injured
- Current redshirt

Roster

== Schedule ==
Date time, TV	Rank^{#}	Opponent^{#}	Result	Record	Site (attendance) city, state
Non-Conference regular season
11/30/1973*		at No. 15 Arizona	L 80-101	0 - 1	McKale Center (13,658); Tucson, AZ
12/3/1973*		Tulane	W 99-78	1 - 1	Assembly Hall (5,676); Champaign, IL
12/8/1973*		Southern California	L 60-71	1 - 2	Assembly Hall (6,450); Champaign, IL
12/11/1973*		Detroit	W 64-60	2 - 2	Assembly Hall (6,121); Champaign, IL
12/14/1973*		Northern Michigan	W 82-72	3 - 2	Assembly Hall (5,617); Champaign, IL
12/27/1973*		St. Johns; ECAC Holiday Festival	L 60-76	3 - 3	Madison Square Garden (8,403); New York, NY
12/29/1973*		Duquesne; ECAC Holiday Festival	L 83-85	3 - 4	Madison Square Garden (-); New York, NY
Big Ten regular season
1/5/1974		at Ohio State	W 75-73	4 - 4 (1 - 0)	St. John Arena (10,641); Columbus, OH
1/12/1974		Purdue	L 69-91	4 - 5 (1 - 1)	Assembly Hall (7,163); Champaign, IL
1/14/1974		Michigan State	L 82-90	4 - 6 (1 - 2)	Assembly Hall (4,685); Champaign, IL
1/19/1974		at No. 19 Wisconsin	L 75-101	4 - 7 (1 - 3)	Wisconsin Field House (9,173); Madison, WI
1/24/1974*		Bradley	L 88-105	4 - 8	Chicago Stadium (4,415); Chicago, IL
1/26/1974*		Jacksonville	L 86-89	4 - 9	Chicago Stadium (-); Chicago, IL
1/28/1974		at Michigan State	L 82-93	4 - 10 (1 - 4)	Jenison Fieldhouse (6,758); East Lansing, MI
2/2/1974		No. 20 Michigan	L 77-101	4 - 11 (1 - 5)	Assembly Hall (7,771); Champaign, IL
2/9/1974		at No. 12 Indiana; Rivalry	L 67-107	4 - 12 (1 - 6)	Assembly Hall (17,054); Bloomington, IN
2/11/1974		at Minnesota	L 61-80	4 - 13 (1 - 7)	Williams Arena (10,925); Minneapolis, MN
2/16/1974		at Northwestern; Rivalry	L 75-86	4 - 14 (1 - 8)	McGaw Memorial Hall (3,798); Evanston, IL
2/18/1974		No. 12 Indiana; Rivalry	L 83-101	4 - 15 (1 - 9)	Assembly Hall (7,368); Champaign, IL
2/23/1974		Iowa; Rivalry	W 91-84	5 - 15 (2 - 9)	Assembly Hall (7,667); Champaign, IL
2/25/1974		Minnesota	L 52-72	5 - 16 (2 - 10)	Assembly Hall (7,720); Champaign, IL
3/2/1974		at Purdue	L 83-94	5 - 17 (2 - 11)	Mackey Arena (10,307); West Lafayette, IN
3/9/1974		Ohio State	L 78-79	5 - 18 (2 - 12)	Assembly Hall (7,697); Champaign, IL
*Non-conference game. ^{#}Rankings from AP Poll. (#) Tournament seedings in parentheses. All times are in Central Time.

== Player stats ==
Player	Games played	Field goals	Free throws	Rebounds	Assists	Points
Rick Schmidt	23	191	111	165	34	493
Jeff Dawson	23	173	72	41	73	418
Dennis Graff	18	125	50	18	13	162
Dave Roberts	23	42	37	75	22	121
Tom Carmichael	23	48	21	127	17	117
Brad Farnham	15	35	16	67	22	86
Don Deputy	17	35	12	61	16	182
Bill Rucks	20	35	11	94	8	81
Howard Johnson	14	30	12	16	18	72
Mike Wente	17	19	12	39	5	150
Dave Smith	10	9	8	18	3	26
Tim Bushell	11	9	5	23	7	23
C.J. Schroeder	8	4	4	4	3	12
Otho Tucker	1	5	0	3	1	10
Mark Bondeson	3	1	2	2	0	4
Mike Dempsey	3	1	0	5	1	2

== Awards and honors ==
- Rick Schmidt
  - Team Most Valuable Player

== Team players drafted into the NBA ==
Player	NBA club	Round	Pick
Jeff Dawson	Kansas City Kings	9	168
