= 1975 National Commissioners Invitational Tournament =

- Season: 1974–75
- Teams: 8
- Finals site: Freedom Hall, Louisville, Kentucky
- Champions: Drake (1st title)
- Runner-up: Arizona (1st title game)
- Semifinalists: Bowling Green (1st semifinal); Purdue (1st semifinal)
- Winning coach: Bob Ortegel (1st title)
- MVP: Bob Elliott (Arizona)

The 1975 National Commissioners Invitational Tournament was a single-elimination tournament of 8 National Collegiate Athletic Association (NCAA) Division I teams that did not participate in the 1975 NCAA Men's Division I Basketball Tournament or 1975 National Invitation Tournament. Drake defeated Southern California, Bowling Green and Arizona in that order to win the championship. Bob Elliot of Arizona was named tournament MVP.

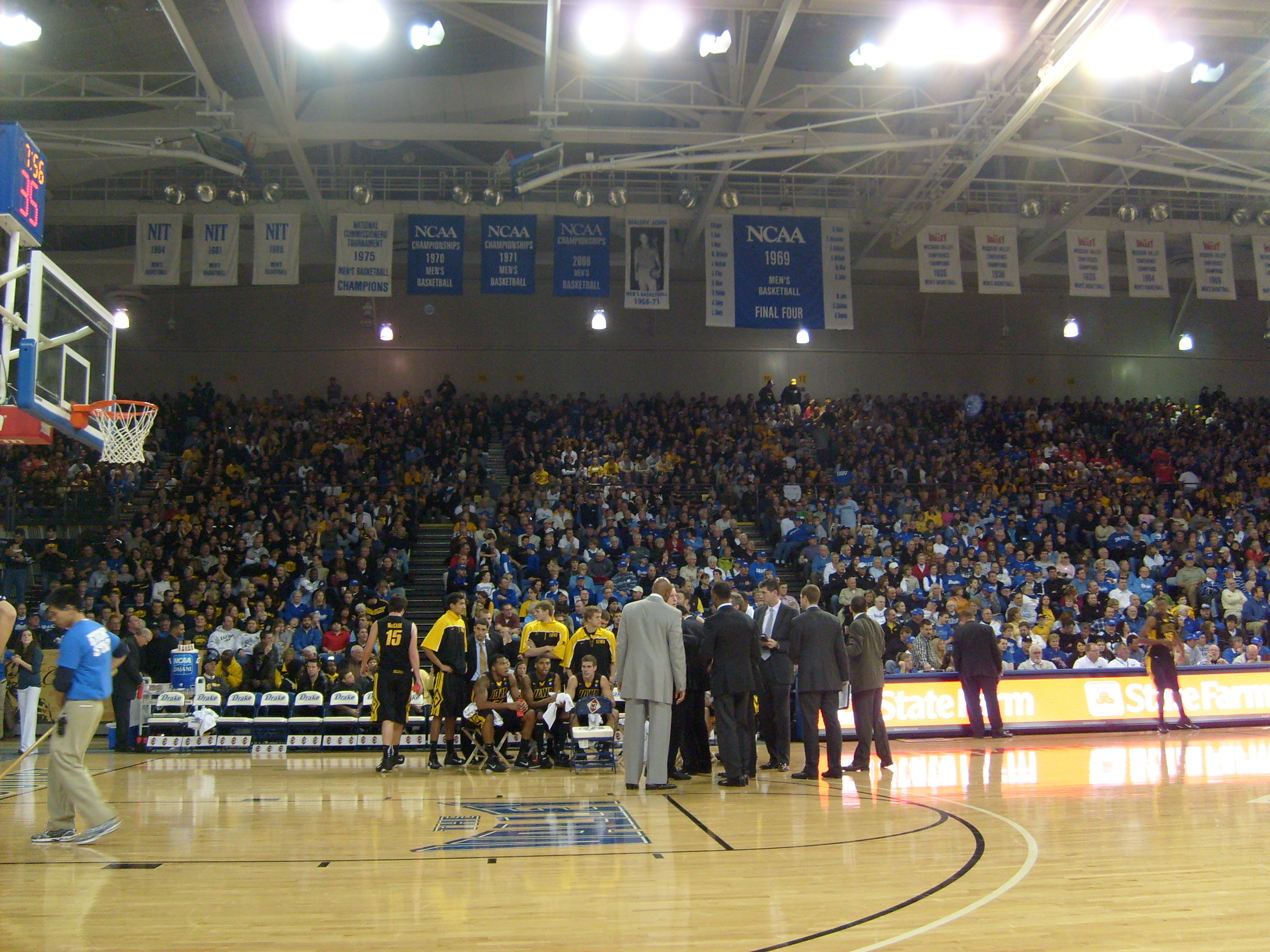
Drake's NCIT banner can be seen hanging

== Brackets ==
First Round
Drake	80
USC	70
Bowling Green	67
Tennessee	58
Arizona	94
East Carolina	78
Purdue	87
Missouri	74

Semifinals
Drake	78
Bowling Green	65
Arizona	102
Purdue	96

Finals
Drake	83
Arizona	76
