= 1912–13 Tennessee Volunteers basketball team =

American college basketball season

1912–13 Tennessee Volunteers basketball
- Conference: Independent
- Record: 7–8
- Head coach: Zora Clevenger (1st season)
- Captain: Victor H. Klein
- Home arena: none

The 1912–13 Tennessee Volunteers basketball team represented the University of Tennessee during the 1912–13 college men's basketball season. The head coach was Zora Clevenger, coaching the team in his first season. The Volunteers team captain was Victor H. Klein.

== Schedule ==
Date time, TV	Opponent	Result	Record	Site city, state
December 9, 1912*	Knoxville All-stars	W 40–26	1–0	Knoxville, TN
December 11, 1912*	Knoxville High School	W 38–22	2–0	Knoxville, TN
December 16, 1912*	Knoxville Central H.S.	W 44–20	3–0	Knoxville, TN
January 11, 1913*	Maryville	W 37–28	4–0	Knoxville, TN
January 13, 1913*	Associates	W 56–16	5–0	Knoxville, TN
January 17, 1913*	Georgia	L 22–52	5–1	Knoxville, TN
January 24, 1913*	at Chattanooga	W 27–18	6–1	Chattanooga, TN
February 5, 1913*	at Chattanooga	W 24–23	7–1	Chattanooga, TN
February 6, 1913*	at Georgia	L 13–38	7–2	Founders Hall; Atlanta, GA
February 7, 1913*	at Mercer	L 18–24	7–3	Macon, GA
February 8, 1913*	at S. Chattanooga YMCA	L 09–17	7–4	Chattanooga, TN
February 18, 1913*	at Central University	W 35–34	8–4	Danville, KY
February 19, 1913*	at Louisville	W 24–16	9–4	Louisville, TN
February 20, 1913*	at New Albany YMCA	L 19–44	9–5	
*Non-conference game. (#) Tournament seedings in parentheses.
