= 1974 Northwestern Wildcats football team =

American college football season

1974 Northwestern Wildcats football
- Conference: Big Ten Conference
- Record: 3–8 (2–6 Big Ten)
- Head coach: John Pont (2nd season)
- Captains: Paul Hiemenz; Larry Lilja
- Home stadium: Dyche Stadium

1974 Big Ten Conference football standings
	Conf.					Overall
Team	W		L		T	W		L		T
No. 3 Michigan +	7	–	1	–	0	10	–	1	–	0
No. 4 Ohio State +	7	–	1	–	0	10	–	2	–	0
No. 12 Michigan State	6	–	1	–	1	7	–	3	–	1
Wisconsin	5	–	3	–	0	7	–	4	–	0
Illinois	4	–	3	–	1	6	–	4	–	1
Purdue	3	–	5	–	0	4	–	6	–	1
Minnesota	2	–	6	–	0	4	–	7	–	0
Iowa	2	–	6	–	0	3	–	8	–	0
Northwestern	2	–	6	–	0	3	–	8	–	0
Indiana	1	–	7	–	0	1	–	10	–	0
+ – Conference co-champions; Rankings from AP Poll

The 1974 Northwestern Wildcats team represented Northwestern University in the 1974 Big Ten Conference football season. In their second year under head coach John Pont, the Wildcats compiled a 3–8 record (2–6 against Big Ten Conference opponents) and finished in a three-way tie for seventh place in the Big Ten Conference.

The team's offensive leaders were quarterback Mitch Anderson with 1,282 passing yards, Jim Pooler with 949 rushing yards, and Scott Yelvington with 417 receiving yards. Three Northwestern players received All-Big Ten honors: (1) offensive tackle Paul Hiemenz (AP-1; UPI-2); (2) wide receiver Steve Yelvington (AP-2); and (3) running back Jim Pooler (AP-2).

== Schedule ==
Date	Opponent	Site	Result	Attendance	Source
September 14	at Michigan State	Spartan Stadium; East Lansing, MI	L 7–41	49,103	
September 21	No. 1 Notre Dame*	Dyche Stadium; Evanston, IL (rivalry)	L 3–49	55,000	
September 28	at No. 10 Nebraska*	Memorial Stadium; Lincoln, NE	L 7–49	76,101	
October 5	Oregon*	Dyche Stadium; Evanston, IL	W 14–10	30,481	
October 12	at Iowa	Kinnick Stadium; Iowa City, IA	L 10–35	51,200	
October 19	Purdue	Dyche Stadium; Evanston, IL	L 26–31	27,557	
October 26	No. 1 Ohio State	Dyche Stadium; Evanston, IL	L 7–55	42,337	
November 2	at Minnesota	Memorial Stadium; Minneapolis, MN	W 21–13	32,922	
November 9	Indiana	Dyche Stadium; Evanston, IL	W 24–22	25,382	
November 16	Wisconsin	Dyche Stadium; Evanston, IL	L 7–52	28,533	
November 23	at Illinois	Memorial Stadium; Champaign, IL (rivalry)	L 14–28	33,753	
*Non-conference game; Rankings from AP Poll released prior to the game

== Roster ==
1974 Northwestern Wildcats football team roster
Players
Coaches
Offense

Pos.	#	Name	Class
QB	12	Mitch Anderson	Sr
RB	44	Rich Boothe	Jr
RB	20	Greg Boykin	Jr
QB	3	Randy Dean	So
OT	74	Rich Dembowski	Jr
OT	68	Paul Hiemenz (C)	Sr
C	57	Larry Lilja (C)	Sr
RB	24	Jim Pooler	Jr
G	67	Mark Ruff	Sr
G	62	DeWayne Shambley	So
WR	46	Bill Stevens	Sr
FB	39	Jim Trimble	Sr
TE	95	Scott Yelvington	So

Defense

Pos.	#	Name	Class
LB	58	Mike Andler	Sr
DB	8	Doug Baske	Sr
DE	43	Doug Belko	Sr
DT	93	John Holliday	Jr
DT	86	Randy Kuceyeski	Jr
DE	98	Rob Mason	Sr
LB	33	Carl Patrnchak	Sr
LB	32	Joe Patrnchak	Sr
DE	13	D. R. Phillips	Sr
SS	22	Pete Shaw	Jr
DB		Robert Dean	So

Special teams

Pos.	#	Name	Class

Head coach

- John Pont

Coordinators/assistant coaches

Legend

- (C) Team captain
- (S) Suspended
- (I) Ineligible
- Injured
- Redshirt
