= 1973–74 Northwestern Wildcats men's basketball team =

American college basketball season

1973–74 Northwestern Wildcats men's basketball
- Conference: Big Ten Conference
- Record: 9–15 (3–11 Big Ten)
- Head coach: Tex Winter (1st season)
- Home arena: Welsh–Ryan Arena

1973–74 Big Ten Conference men's basketball standings
	Conf.				Overall
Team	W		L	PCT	W		L	PCT
No. 9 Indiana	12	–	2	.857	23	–	5	.821
No. 6 Michigan	12	–	2	.857	22	–	5	.815
No. 11 Purdue	10	–	4	.714	21	–	9	.700
Wisconsin	8	–	6	.571	16	–	8	.667
Michigan State	8	–	6	.571	13	–	11	.542
Minnesota	6	–	8	.429	12	–	12	.500
Iowa	5	–	9	.357	8	–	16	.333
Ohio State	4	–	10	.286	9	–	15	.375
Northwestern	3	–	11	.214	9	–	15	.375
Illinois	2	–	12	.143	5	–	18	.217
Rankings from AP Poll

The 1973–74 Northwestern Wildcats men's basketball team represented Northwestern University during the 1973–74 NCAA Division I men's basketball season.

== Roster ==
1973–74 Northwestern Wildcats men's basketball team
Players
Coaches

Pos.	#	Name	Height	Weight	Year	Hometown
G	35	Barry Adams	6 ft 3 in (1.91 m)	180 lb (82 kg)	Fr	Maplewood, Indiana
C	44	Bryan Ashbaugh	6 ft 8 in (2.03 m)	225 lb (102 kg)	Sr	Littleton, Colorado
G	22	John Brodnan	6 ft 1 in (1.85 m)	175 lb (79 kg)	Jr	Arlington, Illinois
F	31	Brad Cartwright	6 ft 6 in (1.98 m)	185 lb (84 kg)	Fr	Morton Grove, Illinois
F	10	Terry Dammeier	6 ft 6 in (1.98 m)	180 lb (82 kg)	Jr	Norridge, Illinois
G	33	Randy Dean	6 ft 2 in (1.88 m)	185 lb (84 kg)	Fr	Whitefish Bay, Wisconsin
G	12	Rob Dean	6 ft 2 in (1.88 m)	185 lb (84 kg)	Fr	Whitefish Bay, Wisconsin
F	45	David Fields	6 ft 8 in (2.03 m)	215 lb (98 kg)	Fr	Wyandotte, Michigan
G	25	Bob Hildebrand	6 ft 1 in (1.85 m)	175 lb (79 kg)	Fr	Glen Ellyn, Illinois
F	20	David Hiser	6 ft 6 in (1.98 m)	185 lb (84 kg)	Fr	Bloomington, Illinois
G	32	Kevin Kachan	6 ft 1 in (1.85 m)	180 lb (82 kg)	Sr	Morton Grove, Illinois
G	30	Billy McKinney	6 ft 0 in (1.83 m)	160 lb (73 kg)	Fr	Zion, Illinois
G	42	Dick Milam	6 ft 2 in (1.88 m)	180 lb (82 kg)	Fr	Lebanon, Illinois
F	40	Joe Otis	6 ft 5 in (1.96 m)	190 lb (86 kg)	Sr	Valparaiso, Indiana
G	43	Tim Teasley	6 ft 1 in (1.85 m)	175 lb (79 kg)	So	Detroit, Illinois
F	24	Willie Williams	6 ft 6 in (1.98 m)	190 lb (86 kg)	Jr	Chicago, Illinois

Head coach

- Tex Winter

Assistant coach(es)

Legend

- (C) Team captain
- (S) Suspended
- (I) Ineligible
- (W) Walk-on
- Injured
- Current redshirt

== Schedule ==
Date time, TV	Rank^{#}	Opponent^{#}	Result	Record	Site city, state
December 1*		at Ohio	W 83–81	1–0	Convocation Center; Athens, Ohio
December 3*		Rollins	W 73–69	2–0	Welsh–Ryan Arena; Evanston, Illinois
December 6*		No. 8 Notre Dame	L 74–98	2–1	Welsh–Ryan Arena; Evanston, Illinois
December 8*		DePaul	W 76–65	3–1	Welsh–Ryan Arena; Evanston, Illinois
December 15*		Valparaiso	W 69–57	4–1	Welsh–Ryan Arena; Evanston, Illinois
December 18*		No. 6 Marquette	L 63–77	4–2	Welsh–Ryan Arena; Evanston, Illinois
December 21*		at Marshall	L 58–59	4–3	Veterans Memorial Fieldhouse; Huntington, WV
December 22*		vs. Texas A&M	L 84–86	4–4	Veterans Memorial Fieldhouse; Huntington, WV
December 29*		St. Joseph	W 83–65	5–4	Welsh–Ryan Arena; Evanston, Illinois
January 5		at Wisconsin	L 53–87	5–5 (0–1)	Wisconsin Field House; Madison, Wisconsin
January 7		Purdue	L 78–85	5–6 (0–2)	Welsh–Ryan Arena; Evanston, Illinois
January 12		Iowa	W 87–67	6–6 (1–2)	Welsh–Ryan Arena; Evanston, Illinois
January 14		at No. 12 Indiana	L 67–72	6–7 (1–3)	Assembly Hall; Bloomington, Indiana
January 19		at Purdue	L 76–89	6–8 (1–4)	Mackey Arena; West Lafayette, Indiana
January 26		No. 11 Indiana	L 53–82	6–9 (1–5)	Welsh–Ryan Arena; Evanston, Illinois
January 28		Minnesota	L 54–57	6–10 (1–6)	Welsh–Ryan Arena; Evanston, Illinois
February 2		at Ohio State	W 68–61	7–10 (2–6)	St. John Arena; Columbus, Ohio
February 5*		Northern Illinois	W 84–63	8–10 (2–6)	Welsh–Ryan Arena; Evanston, Illinois
February 11		at No. 15 Michigan	L 48–50	8–11 (2–7)	Crisler Arena; Ann Arbor, Michigan
February 16		Illinois	W 86–75	9–11 (3–7)	Welsh–Ryan Arena; Evanston, Illinois
February 23		at Michigan State	L 70–73	9–12 (3–8)	Jenison Fieldhouse; East Lansing, Michigan
February 25		Ohio State	L 69–72	9–13 (3–9)	Welsh–Ryan Arena; Evanston, Illinois
March 2		at Iowa	L 76–85	9–14 (3–10)	Iowa Field House; Iowa City, Iowa
March 9		Wisconsin	L 62–77	9–15 (3–11)	Welsh–Ryan Arena; Evanston, Illinois
*Non-conference game. ^{#}Rankings from AP Poll. (#) Tournament seedings in parentheses.
