= Toledo Rockets men's basketball =

Men's basketball team of the University of Toledo

2026–27 Toledo Rockets men's basketball team
- University: University of Toledo
- Head coach: Tod Kowalczyk (17th season)
- Location: Toledo, Ohio
- Arena: Savage Arena (capacity: 7,300)
- Conference: Mid-American
- Nickname: Rockets
- Colors: Midnight blue and gold

NCAA Division I tournament Sweet Sixteen
- 1979

NCAA Division I tournament appearances
- 1954, 1967, 1979, 1980

Conference tournament champions
- 1980

Conference regular-season champions
- 1954, 1967, 1972, 1979, 1980, 1981, 2007, 2014, 2021, 2022, 2023, 2024

Conference division champions
- MAC West: 1999, 2000, 2005, 2007, 2013, 2014, 2018, 2019

Uniforms
Home	Away	Alternate

The Toledo Rockets men's basketball team represents the University of Toledo in Toledo, Ohio. The team currently competes in the Mid-American Conference. The team last played in the NCAA Division I men's basketball tournament in 1980, the seventh longest active drought among all Division I teams. Toledo has won the MAC regular season twelve times, but has won only one MAC Tournament title. Their current head coach is Tod Kowalczyk.

== Postseason ==
=== NCAA tournament results ===
The Rockets have appeared in four NCAA Tournaments. Their combined record is 1–4.

Year	Round	Opponent	Result
1954	First Round	Penn State	L 62–50
1967	First Round	Virginia Tech	L 82–76
1979	Second Round*; Sweet Sixteen	Iowa; Notre Dame	W 74–72; L 79–71
1980	First Round	Florida State	L 94–91

* In 1979 there were two first-round games in their region prior to the second round, but Toledo did not play in a first-round game.

=== NIT results ===
The Rockets have appeared in ten National Invitation Tournaments (NIT). Their combined record is 5–13.

Year	Round	Opponent	Result
1942	Quarterfinals; Semifinals; Third Place Game	Rhode Island; West Virginia; Creighton	W 82–71; L 51-39; L 48–46
1943	Quarterfinals; Semifinals; Championship Game	Manhattan; Washington & Jefferson; St. John's	W 54–47; W 46–39; L 48–27
1981	First Round; Second Round	American; Michigan	W 91–83; L 68–80
1999	First Round	Xavier	L 86–84
2001	First Round; Second Round	South Alabama; Alabama	W 76–67; L 79–69
2004	First Round	Marquette	L 87–72
2007	First Round	Florida State	L 77–61
2014	First Round	Southern Miss	L 66-59
2019	First Round	Xavier	L 78–64
2021	First Round	Richmond	L 76–66
2022	First Round	Dayton	L 74–55
2023	First Round	Michigan	L 90–80

=== CIT results ===
The Rockets have appeared in one CollegeInsider.com Postseason Tournament (CIT). Their record is 1–1.

Year	Round	Opponent	Result
2012	First Round; Second Round	McNeese State; Robert Morris	W 76–63; L 69–51

=== CBI results ===
The Rockets have appeared in one College Basketball Invitational (CBI). Their record is 0–1.

Year	Round	Opponent	Result
2017	First Round	George Washington	L 73–69

=== CCA/NCIT results ===
The Rockets appeared in one of the two National Commissioners Invitational Tournaments, in 1974, and went 1-1.

Year	Round	Opponent	Result
1974	Quarterfinals; Semifinals	Arizona State; Indiana	W 81–74; L 73–72

== Retired numbers ==
In 2007, the Rockets retired former forward Steve Mix's number 50, making him the first player in program history to have his number retired.

No.	Player	Position	Career	Year retired
50	Steve Mix	PF	1966–1969	2007

== Rockets players in the NBA ==
- John Brisker
- Cal Christensen
- Larry Jones
- Tom Kozelko
- Phil Martin
- Dick Miller
- Steve Mix
- George Patterson
- Jim Ray
- Ryan Rollins
- Paul Seymour
- Casey Shaw
