= Tennessee Volunteers basketball =

American men's college basketball team

2026–27 Tennessee Volunteers basketball team
- University: University of Tennessee
- First season: 1908–09; 118 years ago
- Athletic director: Danny White
- Head coach: Rick Barnes; 12th season, 254–120 (.679)
- Location: Knoxville, Tennessee
- Arena: Thompson–Boling Arena (capacity: 21,678)
- NCAA division: Division I
- Conference: SEC
- Nickname: Volunteers
- Colors: Orange and white
- Student section: Rocky Top Rowdies
- All-time record: 1,822–1,121–2 (.619)
- NCAA tournament record: 31–28 (.525)

NCAA Division I tournament Elite Eight
- 2010, 2024, 2025, 2026
Other NCAA Division I tournament results
Sweet Sixteen	1967, 1981, 2000, 2007, 2008, 2010, 2014, 2019, 2023, 2024, 2025, 2026
Appearances	1967, 1976, 1977, 1979, 1980, 1981, 1982, 1983, 1989, 1998, 1999, 2000, 2001, 2006, 2007, 2008, 2009, 2010, 2011, 2014, 2018, 2019, 2021, 2022, 2023, 2024, 2025, 2026

Conference tournament champions
- SEC: 1936, 1941, 1943, 1979, 2022

Conference regular-season champions
- SIAA: 1916 SEC: 1942, 1943, 1945, 1967, 1972, 1977, 1982, 2000, 2008, 2018, 2024

Conference division champions
- SEC East: 1999, 2000, 2006, 2008, 2009

Uniforms
Home	Away	Alternate

The Tennessee Volunteers men's basketball team is the collegiate men's basketball program for the University of Tennessee–Knoxville. The Volunteers (commonly referred to as the "Vols") compete in Division I of the National Collegiate Athletic Association (NCAA) and the Southeastern Conference (SEC). The Volunteers play their home games in Thompson–Boling Arena, on a court nicknamed "the Summitt", after former Tennessee Lady Vols basketball coach Pat Summitt. With a current capacity of 21,678 (formerly 24,535), Tennessee has consistently ranked in the top 15 in the nation in terms of volume of attendance, averaging 14,817 (60.39% capacity) attendance from 1988 through 2006, and averaging 17,194 (79.34% capacity) attendance from 2007 through 2018 after reducing seating capacity prior to the 2007 season.

Historically, Tennessee ranks third in the SEC in all-time wins. The Volunteers have appeared 28 times in the NCAA tournament, most recently in 2026. The team appeared in the Elite Eight in 2010, 2024, 2025, and 2026, its deepest tournament runs in program history. Many notable players have played collegiately at Tennessee—players such as Bernard King, Dale Ellis, Allan Houston, Tobias Harris, Grant Williams, and Dalton Knecht who all play(ed) in the NBA. Chris Lofton, Ron Slay, Tyler Smith, Tony White, and John Fulkerson are also notable players who later played professionally in other leagues.

The Volunteers are currently coached by Rick Barnes, who was hired on March 31, 2015, to replace Donnie Tyndall.

== History ==
=== Ray Mears era ===
==== Building the foundation: "This is Big Orange Country!" ====
In 1963, the University of Tennessee hired Ray Mears to become the head coach of the men's basketball program. The hiring of Mears, who was coming off an NCAA small college championship at Wittenberg University, ushered in the most sustained period of success in Tennessee men's basketball history.

In his first year, Mears's Volunteers improved from a 4–19 record in 1962 to 13–11, highlighted by two wins over the Kentucky Wildcats. Before Mears, Tennessee had only beaten the Wildcats twice in 39 meetings. Throughout his career, Mears gained notoriety throughout the SEC for frequently being a thorn in the powerhouse Kentucky's side. In an era where Kentucky was coached by future College Basketball Hall of Fame members Adolph Rupp and Joe B. Hall, winning 75% of their games, Mears recorded a 15–15 record against the Wildcats.

Led by A. W. Davis, the Volunteers finished second in the SEC in each of the next two seasons and recorded 20 wins in 1965, reaching that mark for the first time in 17 years. This success and the resultant growing fan support led to the university's decision to expand the 7,500-seat Amory-Fieldhouse to 12,700 seats. It was renamed Stokely Athletic Center to honor William B. Stokely, whose donation funded the renovation.

In the expanded Stokely Center's inaugural season, the Volunteers captured the 1967 SEC championship and made the program's first-ever NCAA tournament appearance. Dubbed the "Fearless Five," the 1967 team won road games against top conference teams Florida, Kentucky, and Mississippi State. The win over Mississippi State, coming in double-overtime on a pair of Bill Justus free throws, secured Tennessee's first SEC championship in 24 years and is referred to by some as the greatest basketball game in Tennessee history.

From 1968 to 1973, Mears kept Tennessee among the top teams of the SEC, winning a second SEC championship in 1972 and finishing second in every year except 1970.

==== "The Ernie and Bernie Show" ====
In 1974, Mears and his trusted assistant Stu Aberdeen were able to recruit New York City standout forward Ernie Grunfeld to Knoxville. In his freshman season, Grunfeld led the team in scoring, averaging 17.4 points per game, and received first-team All-SEC honors.

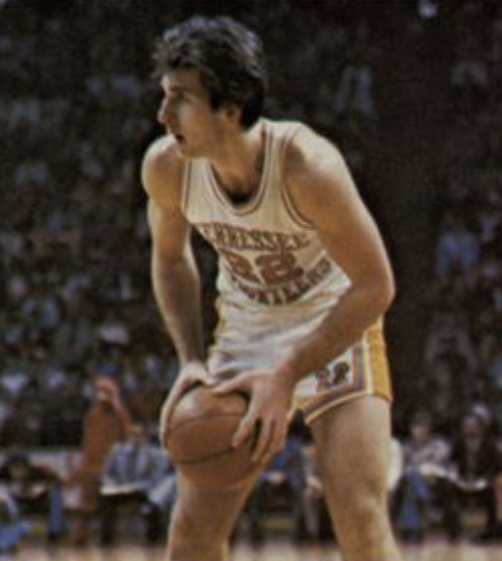
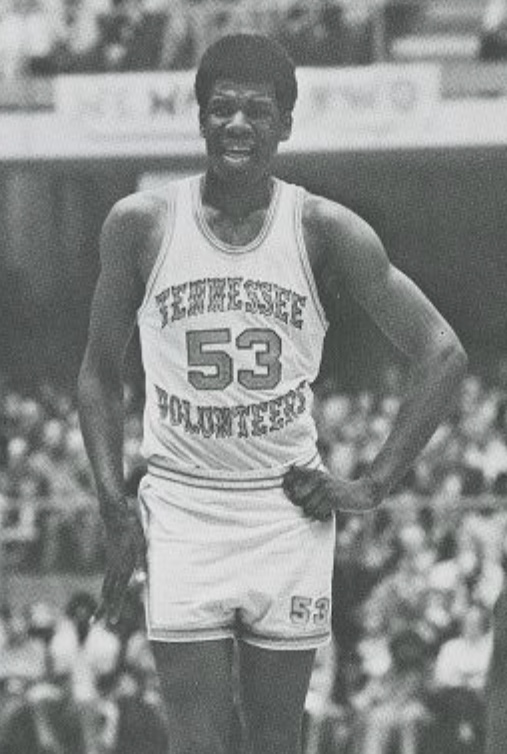
Ernie Grunfeld (left) and Bernard King (right) were high-scoring teammates for the Vols from 1974 to 1977.

The following season, Grunfeld was joined by fellow New Yorker Bernard King. Known as "The Ernie and Bernie Show," King and Grunfeld led the Volunteers to a 61–20 record over three years and an SEC championship in 1977. During their three years together, Tennessee posted a 5–1 record against Kentucky. The Volunteers reached the National Invitation Tournament in 1975 and the NCAA tournament in 1976 and 1977. King was named first-team All-American and SEC Player of the Year in 1975 and 1976, and then shared the honor with Grunfeld in 1977, with both being named SEC Co-Player of the Year.

Grunfeld graduated from Tennessee in 1977 and King decided to skip his senior year in order to enter the NBA draft. King was drafted 7th overall to the New Jersey Nets and Grunfeld went 11th overall to the Milwaukee Bucks.

Perhaps the biggest impact of the "Ernie and Bernie" show was how it changed the national perception of the Tennessee basketball program. This "Double Trouble from Tennessee" was featured in the February 1976 edition of Sports Illustrated. In 2013, ESPN premiered a 30 for 30 documentary called "Bernie and Ernie" about the all-time great Volunteer basketball players.

==== Exit and legacy ====
Following the exit of his two biggest stars, Mears, who long struggled with depression, was not able to coach the team in 1978. Under the watch of interim coach Cliff Wettig, the Volunteers struggled to an 11–16 record, and Mears officially retired for health reasons after the season.

Mears employed marketing tactics to get fans to games, including orange blazers, his introduction of the Pride of the Southland Band to basketball games, and his pre-game warmups that compared to the Harlem Globetrotters for creativity. At the beginning of his tenure, Mears declared, "This is Big Orange Country," and this slogan lived on long past his coaching years.

=== Don DeVoe era ===
Don DeVoe was named Mears's successor and took over as head coach for the 1979 season. Despite the losing record in 1978, DeVoe inherited a roster centered on All-American center Reggie Johnson. DeVoe's 1979 Volunteers finished the regular season with a 21–12 record, beating Kentucky twice and earning a second-place finish in the SEC. The 1979 SEC tournament was the first held in 27 years, and the Volunteers reached the tournament finals, where they once again defeated Kentucky by a score of 75–69 to win their first SEC Tournament championship since 1943. With the tournament championship win, the Volunteers were invited back to the NCAA tournament, where they recorded the program's first NCAA tournament win with a defeat of Eastern Kentucky. Tennessee was eliminated in the second round with a loss to Notre Dame.

DeVoe led Tennessee to the NCAA tournament each of the next five years, but none of his teams advanced past the second round. Through his first seven years at UT, DeVoe compiled an overall record of 143–79 (.644). The program's momentum under his direction eventually weakened, however, and the Volunteers were not invited to the NCAA tournament or the NIT in 1986 or 1987.

Entering the 1989 season, DeVoe's 11th year at Tennessee, his teams had not reached the NCAA tournament or finished above 6th in the SEC since 1983. DeVoe led the Volunteers to a 19–11 record and a berth in the NCAA tournament. After an 84–68 loss to West Virginia in the first round, DeVoe resigned.

The growth of UT basketball under DeVoe is still seen today in the Vols' current home arena, Thompson–Boling Arena, which was built during his tenure. By the mid-1980s, the overflow crowds had grown too large for the 12,700-seat Stokley Athletic Center. In 1988, the Volunteers moved to the new $30 million Thompson–Boling Arena, which seated over 24,500 people—at the time, the largest facility ever built specifically for basketball in the United States. Sitting on the banks of the Tennessee River nearby historic Neyland Stadium, the arena has accommodated 21,678 people since a 2007 renovation.

=== Houston, O'Neill, Green, and Peterson ===
In 1990, Wade Houston, an Alcoa, Tennessee native and former assistant coach at Louisville, became the first African-American head coach in Tennessee and SEC history. Houston's son, Allan Houston, came to UT to play for his father and would become one of the most accomplished players in Tennessee history. With 2801 points, Allan Houston finished his career as Tennessee's all-time leading scorer and was named All-American in 1992 and 1993.

Houston was fired after a 5–22 campaign in 1994, finishing the worst season in Tennessee history. None of his teams reached the NCAA tournament, and only two of his teams received invitations to the NIT, the two of which were also his only teams to finish with winning records. Houston finished with an overall record of 65–90 at Tennessee.

Houston was replaced by Kevin O'Neill in 1995. O'Neil was an intense and somewhat high-strung sideline coach, but also a skilled recruiter as despite taking over a program depleted in talent, he was able to sign talented players such as Brandon Wharton, Tony Harris, and Isiah Victor. O'Neill left Tennessee to become the head coach at Northwestern after the 1997 season.

O'Neill was replaced by Oregon Ducks head coach Jerry Green. Green inherited a roster with significant young talent and was able to an immediate improvement in on-court success. His first Tennessee team produced a 20–9 overall record—a nine-win improvement over the 11–16 record of O'Neill's third and final UT team—and advanced to the 1998 NCAA tournament. In his second year, Green's Volunteers won the 1999 SEC East Division championship and defeated Kentucky twice in the same season for the first time since 1979, in what is generally regarded to be the best overall year in school athletics history. (The 1998 Tennessee Football team finished 13–0 and won the first-ever BCS National Championship. In women's basketball, Pat Summitt led the Lady Volunteers to a 39–0 NCAA championship season, the program's third consecutive national title.)

The 2000 Tennessee men's basketball team finished 26–7, repeating as SEC East champions, winning the Volunteers' first SEC championship since 1982, and setting a program record for most wins in a single season. In the NCAA tournament, the Volunteers advanced to the first Sweet Sixteen in school history, where they lost a close contest to North Carolina.

Green's Volunteers began the 2001 season with a 16–1 record, rising to No. 4 in the AP Poll. Beginning with a ten-point loss at Kentucky in mid-January, Tennessee then struggled to a 22–11 finish. Green's team advanced to the NCAA tournament—the fourth appearance in Green's four seasons—losing in the first round. Coupled with his multiple incidents with local media and Tennessee fans, this disappointing finish to the season led to Green's resignation.

He was replaced by Buzz Peterson, who failed to lead the program to an NCAA tournament berth in his four years as head coach. He was fired after the 2005 season, in which his team finished 14–17.

=== Bruce Pearl era ===
==== Revival in Big Orange Country ====
After taking Wisconsin–Milwaukee to a Sweet Sixteen in 2005, Bruce Pearl was hired as the new Tennessee men's basketball coach. Pearl's assistants Tony Jones, Steve Forbes, Jacob Nichols, Jason Shay, and Ken Johnson were part of a staff that would help to lead the Volunteers to the NCAA tournament six years in a row.

==== 2005–06 ====
Pearl inherited a roster that had not experienced much winning, but showed promise with future NBA senior point guard C. J. Watson and All-SEC freshman team shooting guard Chris Lofton.

Pearl's coaching, which included playing an up-tempo style and pressing defense, led to immediate gains for Tennessee. In his first season, Pearl led the Volunteers to a 22–8 record, an SEC East Division championship, and a no. 2 seed in the NCAA Tournament. Pearl's first team achieved some of the more memorable wins in program history, including two wins against the eventual national champion Florida Gators. Another memorable win came when Chris Lofton, who is a Kentucky native, led the Volunteers over Kentucky in Rupp Arena for the program's first win there since 1999.

==== 2006–07 ====
Pearl's 2006 recruiting class was ranked among the top ten in college basketball. Despite the influx of freshmen and their inexperience, the Volunteers were able to open with a 13–2 start to the season. All-American guard Chris Lofton was injured and missed a good portion of January and early February, during which time the Volunteers opened 3–5 in SEC play. After Lofton returned, Tennessee won 7 out of their last 8 regular season games. Given a no. 5 seed, the Volunteers returned to the Sweet Sixteen where they faced no. 1 seed Ohio State. Tennessee led 49–32 at halftime, but the eventual NCAA runner-up Buckeyes mounted a comeback to defeat the Volunteers by a score of 85–84.

During the 2006–07 season, the Volunteers were ranked 4th nationally in attendance, with an average of 19,661 fans in Thompson–Boling Arena, which has a capacity of 21,758. This marked an increase in attendance of an average of 7,436 per game since Pearl arrived in March 2005.

==== 2007–08 ====
Preseason expectations for the Volunteers were high entering the 2008 season. Chris Lofton was a preseason pick by some to win National Player of the Year, and he was joined by Tyler Smith, an All-Big Ten freshman transfer from Iowa. Senior guards JaJuan Smith and Jordan Howell, along with rising sophomores Wayne Chism and Ramar Smith, propelled the Volunteers to a preseason no. 7 ranking.

The team posted a record of 28–3 in the regular season. The season was highlighted by the rivalry matchup between Tennessee and Memphis. John Calipari's Tigers were undefeated and ranked no. 1 and the Volunteers were no. 2. In front the largest TV audience to date to ever watch a game on ESPN, the two teams remained evenly matched for thirty-nine minutes. The Volunteers trailed 61–60 with 30 seconds left before Tyler Smith made a jump-shot to give UT the lead. The Volunteers added three free throws and took the contest by a score of 66–62. The following Monday, Tennessee was ranked no. 1 in polls for the first time in school history.

The Volunteers finished the regular season as the outright SEC champions and the no. 1 seed for the SEC Tournament in Atlanta. The Volunteers won their first game to set up a semifinal matchup against Arkansas in the Georgia Dome. The night before the game, an EF2 tornado hit Downtown Atlanta, damaging the Georgia Dome and much of the surrounding area. Because of this, the tournament was nearly canceled but was ultimately moved to Georgia Tech's Alexander Memorial Coliseum. The Razorbacks were able to upset the Volunteers, denying them a place in the final and a shot at their first SEC Tournament championship in 30 years.

The Volunteers received a no. 2 seed in the NCAA tournament. They advanced to the Sweet Sixteen, where they lost to the Louisville Cardinals men's basketball. Despite the disappointing ending, the 2008 season is remembered as one of the best in program history.

==== 2008–09 ====
Replacing Chris Lofton proved a difficult task in the 2009 season. Now led by Tyler Smith, the Volunteers finished with a 21–13 record. However, Tennessee claimed another SEC division championship. The Volunteers advanced to the SEC Tournament Championship in Tampa before losing to Mississippi State 64–61. The Volunteers lost their NCAA tournament first-round game to Oklahoma State.

==== 2009–10 ====
Entering the regular season ranked in the top 10, the Volunteers started the season 10–2. On New Year's Day, players Melvin Goins, Cam Tatum, Brian Williams, and leading scorer Tyler Smith were arrested after a traffic stop when police found marijuana and an illegal firearm. The players were all suspended for multiple games and Tyler Smith was eventually dismissed from the team.

After the suspensions, the Volunteers were left with only six scholarship players. The Volunteers defeated Charlotte and then hosted no. 1 Kansas the next game. In front of a sellout crowd, the undermanned Volunteers defeated the Jayhawks 76–68. Tennessee cemented its lead with a shot clock-beating three-point shot with under a minute left by local freshman walk-on Skylar McBee, who entered the rotation due to the suspensions.

Tennessee rode the momentum of the Kansas upset to a 23–7 regular season record. This included another upset of second-ranked Kentucky, which featured future NBA All-Stars John Wall and DeMarcus Cousins, as well as four other eventual NBA players. The Volunteers won 74–65 at home in front of a raucous crowd. The Wildcats were able to avenge the loss a week and half later in the SEC Tournament.

As a no. 6 seed in a bracket featuring overall top seed Kansas, the Volunteers defeated a Steve Fisher-coached San Diego State team with Kawhi Leonard in the first round. No. 14 seed Ohio upset the no. 3 seed Georgetown Hoyas, setting up a matchup between the Volunteers and the Bobcats in the following round. After winning 83–68, Tennessee advanced to Bruce Pearl's third Sweet Sixteen in five years.

In a rematch of the 2007 Sweet Sixteen, the Volunteers faced the Ohio State Buckeyes at the Edward Jones Dome in St. Louis. In a back and forth battle with the Evan Turner-led Buckeyes, Tennessee held a 76–73 lead with 13 seconds left. Turner missed a three-point shot, rebounded his own missed shot, and attempted a final three-point shot that was blocked by J. P. Prince, securing the Volunteers an appearance in the Elite Eight for the first time in program history.

Tennessee faced Michigan State in the Elite Eight. After a fast start, the Vols sputtered in the second half and Michigan State was able to keep the game close. Down by one point with 11 seconds left, Tennessee's Scotty Hopson was set to attempt two free throws. He made the first but missed the second. With the score tied, Michigan State advanced the ball and was fouled on a fast break. Raymar Morgan made one of two free throws, and Michigan State was able to defeat Tennessee one game short of the Final Four.

==== 2010–11 ====
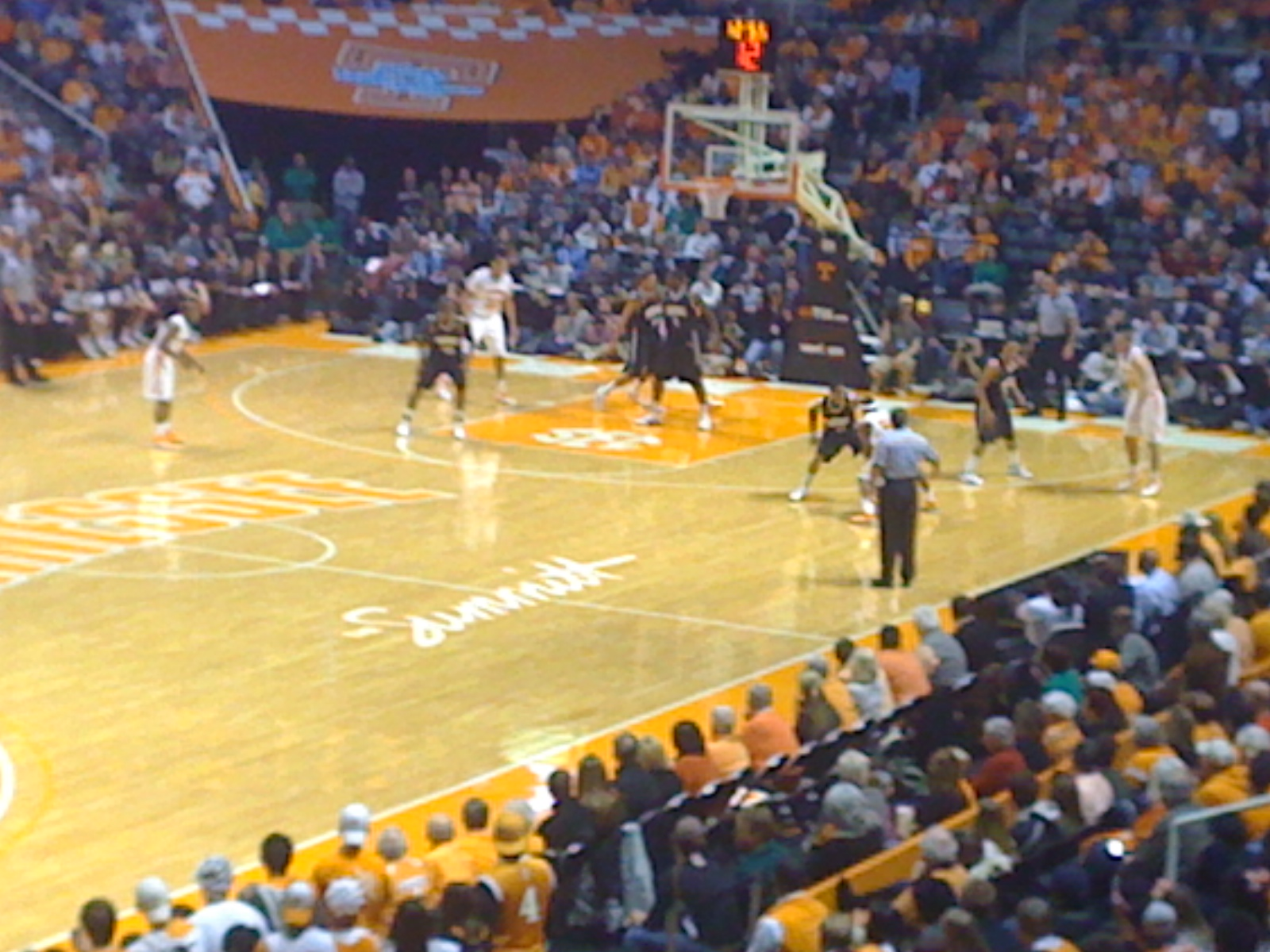
The Tennessee Vols facing the Vanderbilt Commodores in Thompson–Boling Arena

Tennessee opened the 2010–11 season with success, winning the Preseason NIT and rising as high as no. 7 in the national polls. In mid-December, the NCAA announced an investigation into Bruce Pearl for his role in a possible recruiting violation. SEC Commissioner Mike Slive suspended Pearl for the first half of the SEC season. Tennessee faltered throughout the rest of the season to a 19–15 record. Tennessee appeared in the NCAA tournament for the sixth consecutive year under Pearl and faced Michigan in the opening round. The Volunteers were defeated 75–45 in what proved to be Pearl's last game.

On March 21, 2011, the week after the loss, the university announced the firing of Pearl, based on Pearl's misconduct of lying to the NCAA in the ongoing investigation. Pearl was eventually given a three-year show-cause penalty.

=== Cuonzo Martin and Donnie Tyndall ===
On March 27, 2011, the University of Tennessee announced the hiring of Cuonzo Martin as the Volunteers' 18th head coach. Martin had spent the prior three seasons at Missouri State, where he compiled a record of 61–41. Martin was able to lead the Missouri State team from an 11–20 record and a last-place finish in the Missouri Valley Conference to a 26–9 record and a first-place conference finish.

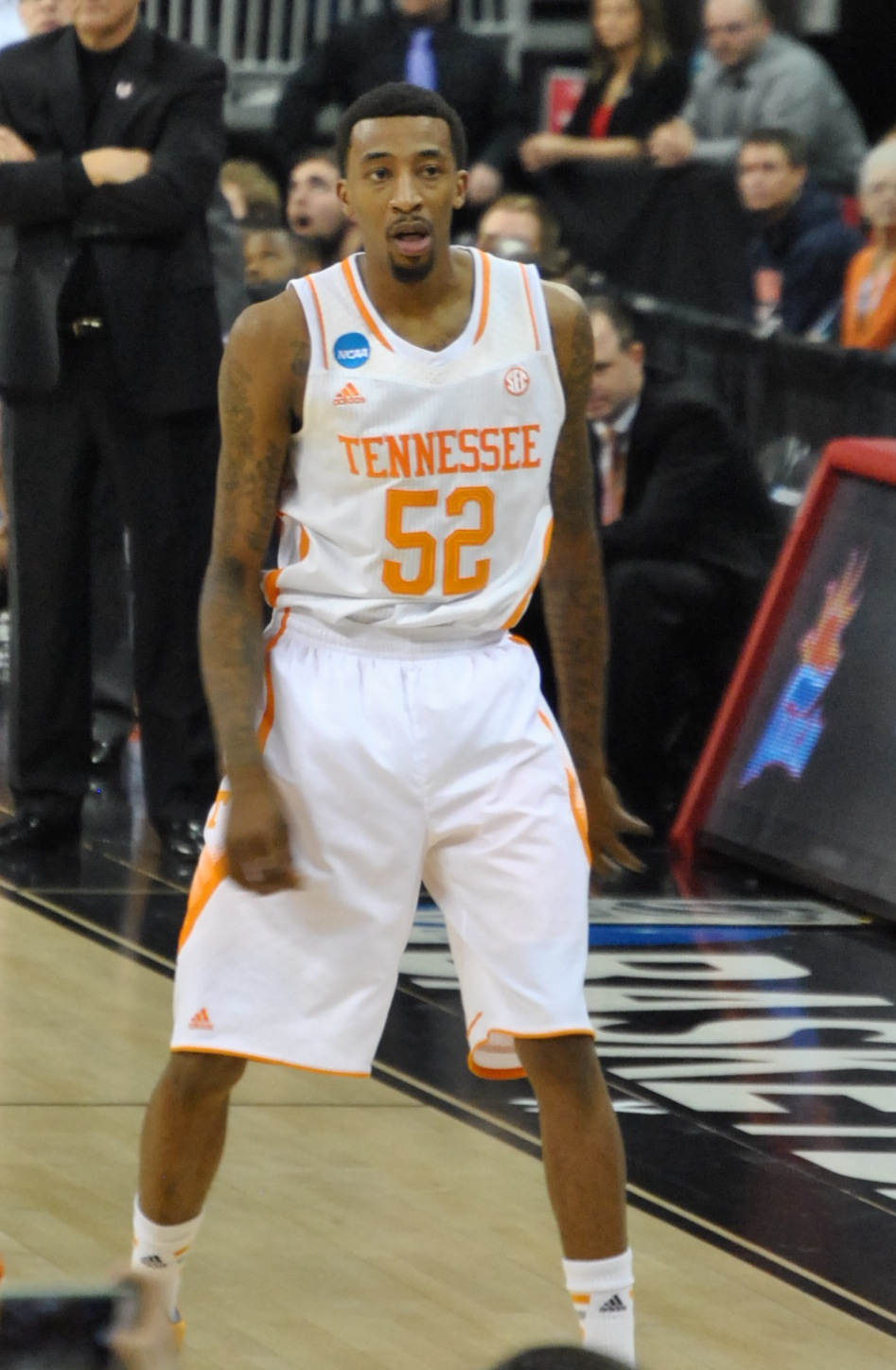
Jordan McRae

Martin took over a depleted roster with low expectations. After the departure of Tobias Harris following his freshman season, the Volunteers were picked to finish near the bottom of the SEC in 2011–12. With the emergence of Jordan McRae and Jeronne Maymon, and the mid-season addition of Jarnell Stokes, Martin took a team that had lost their top three—and seven of their top ten—contributors from the previous season to a second-place finish in the SEC, largely because of their tough defense and lack of turnovers. With an outside chance at the NCAA tournament, the Volunteers lost their first SEC tournament game to Ole Miss, ending their NCAA chances. They played in the NIT before losing in the second round.

In 2012–13, the Volunteers started off slowly, posting an 11–10 record before finishing the regular season 8–1. UT was eliminated in the second round of the SEC Tournament and was left out of the NCAA tournament for the second straight year, finishing as one of the last teams out.

Expectations were high heading into 2013–14 with a roster many felt could compete for a Sweet Sixteen appearance. However, the fans quickly grew vocally upset after another slow start of 16–11. A petition with thousands of signatures surfaced online for the firing of Cuonzo Martin and the re-hiring of Bruce Pearl, whose show-cause order was ending the next year. Whether the petition motivated the team or not, the Volunteers finished the season 5–1 and earned a place in the "First Four" round of the NCAA tournament. They defeated Iowa in the play-in game in Dayton, Ohio to move on to face the UMass Minutemen. Martin's Volunteers, who were the lower seed, were favored by many and easily defeated UMass. In one of the biggest upsets in tournament history, Mercer upset Duke, and the Volunteers went on to defeat Mercer to advance to the Sweet Sixteen. Tennessee then played Michigan in Indianapolis. In front of one of the largest crowds to witness a Sweet Sixteen game, the Volunteers' comeback fell short and UT lost to Michigan by a score of 73–71.

Martin resigned from Tennessee and accepted the coaching job at California on April 15, 2014. After a brief coaching search, Tennessee athletics director Dave Hart announced on April 21, 2014 that former Morehead State and Southern Mississippi head coach Donnie Tyndall would become the next head coach of the Tennessee Volunteers.

Tyndall inherited a roster that returned one contributing player from the previous year. Also, due to Jarnell Stokes's decision to enter the NBA draft and two other players transferring, Tyndall had to recruit and sign nearly one-third of the 2015 team's roster in less than a month. Under these circumstances, he led the 2015 team to a 16–16 record.

After the season was over, Tennessee announced it was firing Tyndall with cause after it learned that he had lied to both UT and the NCAA about the severity of major NCAA violations that had occurred at Southern Miss. Hart said that he would have never hired Tyndall had the true extent of the violations been known. By this time, it was clear that Tyndall would face severe penalties for his role in the violations, including a suspension for part of the season. According to ESPN, Hart and other officials were still smarting from Pearl having to sit out the first half of conference play three years earlier, and were not willing to face the prospect of an equally lengthy suspension for Tyndall.

=== Rick Barnes era ===
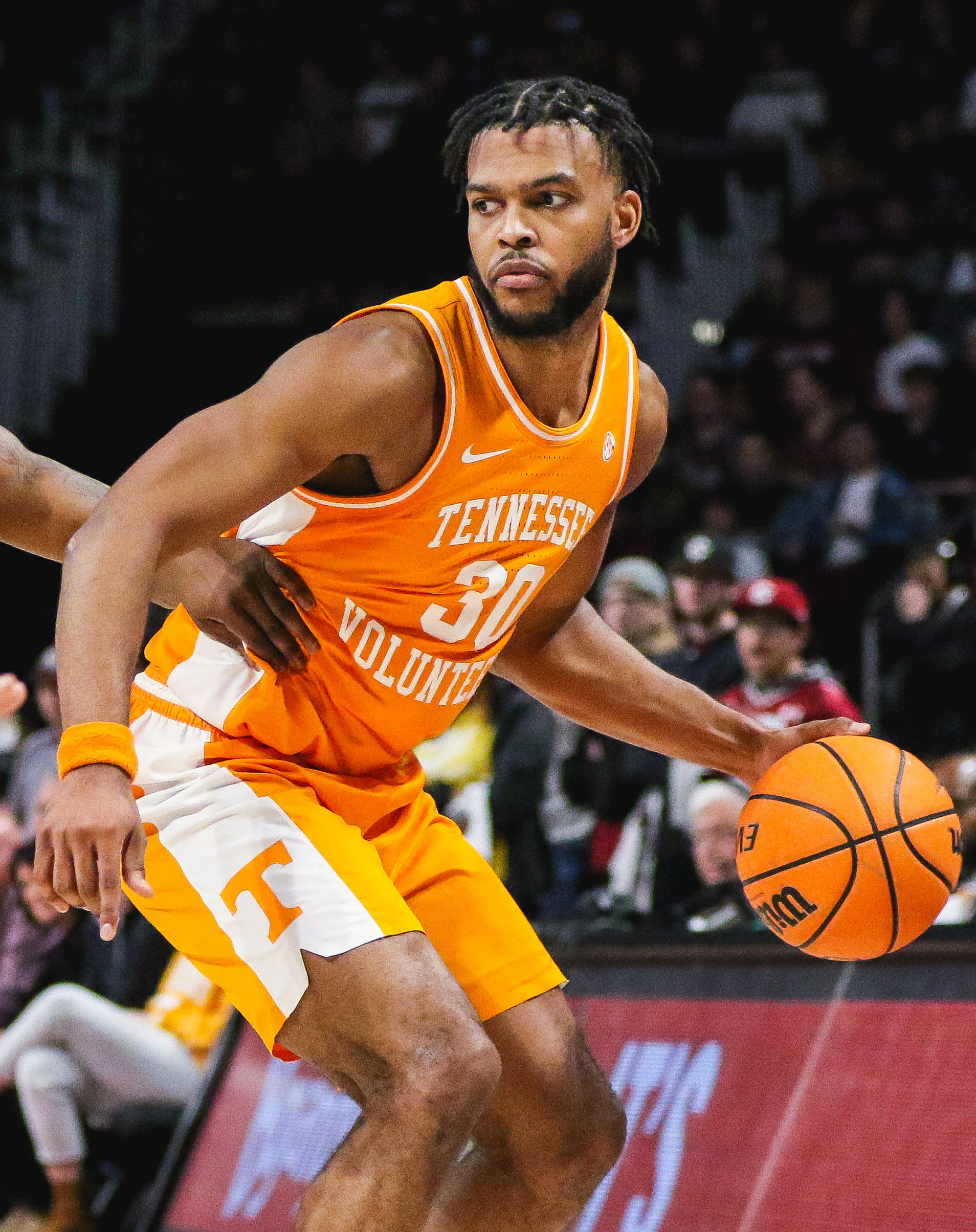
Josiah-Jordan James in 2022.

On March 31, 2015, Rick Barnes was named the new Tennessee men's basketball coach. Barnes boasted the best record of any incoming coach in school history, with an overall record of 604–314 from his previous tenures at Texas, Clemson, and Providence. Barnes is originally from nearby Hickory, North Carolina, and his wife, Candy, graduated from Tennessee in 1975. The Rick Barnes era began on a winning note as Tennessee defeated UNC Asheville, 82–78 in Barnes' debut game at UT.

In Barnes' third year as Tennessee's coach, he completed quite the turnaround from the previous year's 16–16 (8–10) team, as his team would finish the regular season 26–9 (13–5) and capture a share of the SEC regular season title. This would be Tennessee's first regular season title since 2008 and tenth overall. Tennessee also reached the SEC men's basketball championship final where they were defeated by Kentucky 77–72.

In 2019, Tennessee won 30 games for the first time since 2007-08. The Volunteers would earn a record of 31–6 (15–3) including an 18-game win streak and a No.1 ranking in the polls for the first time since the 2007–08 season. The Volunteers again reached the SEC men's basketball championship final where they were defeated by Auburn 84–64. The Volunteers proceeded to earn a No. 2 seed in the 2019 NCAA tournament, where they defeated Colgate 77–70 in the first round. Tennessee overcame a resurgent Iowa Hawkeyes team in the second round by a score of 83–77 in an overtime thriller. The Volunteers fell to Purdue in the Sweet Sixteen in overtime after a thrilling come-from-behind run led by Volunteer guard Admiral Schofield. Purdue's Ryan Cline kept the Boilermakers in the game late and after a controversial call on Lamonte Turner, the Vols lost. Junior forward Grant Williams captured the 2018–19 SEC player of the year award, his second consecutive year obtaining the honor.

== Season–by–season results ==
Record table
Season	Team	Overall	Conference	Standing	Postseason
Tennessee Volunteers (SIAA) (1908–1920)
Robert C. Whitaker (1908–1910)
1908–1909	Tennessee	2–5	–	–	–
1909–1910	Tennessee	7–8	–	–	–
Robert C. Whitaker:		9–13 (.409)			
A. A. Stone (1910–1911)
1910–1911	Tennessee	7–9	–	–	–
A. A. Stone:		7–9 (.438)			
Zora Clevenger (1911–1916)
1911–1912	Tennessee	5–5	–	–	–
1912–1913	Tennessee	9–5	–	–	–
1913–1914	Tennessee	15–2	–	–	–
1914–1915	Tennessee	9–2	–	–	–
1915–1916	Tennessee	12–0	–	–	–
Zora Clevenger:		50–14 (.781)			
John R. Bender (1916–1917)
1916–1917	Tennessee	10–5	–	–	–
John R. Binder:		10–5 (.667)			
R. H. Fitzgerald (1917–1919)
1917–1918	Tennessee	3–9–1	–	–	–
1918–1919	Tennessee	2–6	–	–	–
R. H. Fitzgerald:		5–15–1 (.262)			
John R. Bender (1919–1921)
1919–1920	Tennessee	11–3	–	–	–
Tennessee Volunteers (Southern Conference) (1920–1932)
1920–1921	Tennessee	8–7	–	6th	–
John R. Bender:		19–10 (.655)			
M. B. Banks (1921–1926)
1921–1922	Tennessee	13–7–1	1–3	10th	–
1922–1923	Tennessee	15–2	3–1	4th	–
1923–1924	Tennessee	10–8	5–5	8th	–
1924–1925	Tennessee	6–8	1–5	T–17th	–
1925–1926	Tennessee	9–8	1–3	17th	–
M. B. Banks:		53–33–1 (.615)	11–17 (.393)		
W. H. Britton (1926–1935)
1926–1927	Tennessee	7–12	5–4	11th	–
1927–1928	Tennessee	0–12	0–8	21st	–
1928–1929	Tennessee	11–5	7–4	T–6th	–
1929–1930	Tennessee	13–4	7–2	5th	–
1930–1931	Tennessee	11–10	4–8	17th	–
1931–1932	Tennessee	8–7	5–5	13th	–
Tennessee Volunteers (Southeastern Conference) (1932–present)
1932–1933	Tennessee	9–11	3–7	10th	–
1933–1934	Tennessee	10–7	3–5	8th	–
1934–1935	Tennessee	11–5	7–4	3rd	–
W. H. Britton:		80–73 (.523)	13–16 (.448)		
Blair Gullion (1935–1938)
1935–1936	Tennessee	15–6	8–4	T–1st	–
1936–1937	Tennessee	17–5	7–1	2nd	–
1937–1938	Tennessee	15–8	7–4	5th	–
Blair Gullion:		47–19 (.712)	22–9 (.710)		
John Mauer (1938–1947)
1938–1939	Tennessee	14–7	6–5	8th	–
1939–1940	Tennessee	14–7	7–3	2nd	–
1940–1941	Tennessee	17–5	8–3	3rd	–
1941–1942	Tennessee	19–3	7–1	1st	–
1942–1943	Tennessee	14–4	6–3	3rd	–
1943–1944	*No Team	–	–	–	–
1944–1945	Tennessee	18–5	8–2	T-1st	NIT quarterfinal
1945–1946	Tennessee	15–5	8–3	3rd	–
1946–1947	Tennessee	16–5	10–3	3rd	–
John Mauer:		127–41 (.756)	60–23 (.723)		
Emmett Lowery (1947–1959)
1947–1948	Tennessee	20–5	10–2	3rd	–
1948–1949	Tennessee	19–7	8–3	3rd	–
1949–1950	Tennessee	15–11	5–6	7th	–
1950–1951	Tennessee	10–13	5–9	T–10th	–
1951–1952	Tennessee	13–9	7–7	T–6th	–
1952–1953	Tennessee	13–8	7–6	4th	–
1953–1954	Tennessee	11–12	7–7	T–6th	–
1954–1955	Tennessee	15–7	8–6	4th	–
1955–1956	Tennessee	10–14	6–8	T–6th	–
1956–1957	Tennessee	13–9	5–9	9th	–
1957–1958	Tennessee	16–7	8–6	T–5th	–
1958–1959	Tennessee	14–8	8–6	T–5th	–
Emmett Lowery:		169–110 (.606)	84–75 (.528)		
John Sines (1959–1962)
1959–1960	Tennessee	12–11	7–7	6th	–
1960–1961	Tennessee	10–15	4–10	11th	–
1961–1962	Tennessee	4–19	2–12	12th	–
John Sines:		26–45 (.366)	13–29 (.310)		
Ray Mears (1962–1977)
1962–1963	Tennessee	13–11	6–8	7th	–
1963–1964	Tennessee	16–8	9–5	2nd	–
1964–1965	Tennessee	20–5	12–4	2nd	–
1965–1966	Tennessee	19–8	10–6	T–3rd	–
1966–1967	Tennessee	21–7	15–3	1st	NCAA Regional Fourth Place
1967–1968	Tennessee	20–6	13–5	2nd	–
1968–1969	Tennessee	21–7	13–5	2nd	NIT Third Place
1969–1970	Tennessee	16–9	10–8	5th	–
1970–1971	Tennessee	21–7	13–5	2nd	NIT quarterfinal
1971–1972	Tennessee	19–6	14–4	T–1st	–
1972–1973	Tennessee	15–9	13–5	T–2nd	–
1973–1974	Tennessee	17–9	12–6	2nd	CCA first round
1974–1975	Tennessee	18–8	12–6	T–3rd	NCI first round
1975–1976	Tennessee	21–6	14–4	2nd	NCAA Division I first round
1976–1977	Tennessee	22–6	16–2	T–1st	NCAA Division I first round
Ray Mears:		278–112 (.713)	182–76 (.705)		
Cliff Wettig (1977–1978)
1977–1978	Tennessee	11–16	6–12	T–7th	–
Cliff Wettig:		11–16 (.407)	6–12 (.333)		
Don DeVoe (1978–1989)
1978–1979	Tennessee	21–12	12–6	2nd	NCAA Division I second round
1979–1980	Tennessee	18–11	12–6	T–3rd	NCAA Division I second round
1980–1981	Tennessee	21–8	12–6	3rd	NCAA Division I Sweet 16
1981–1982	Tennessee	20–10	13–5	T–1st	NCAA Division I second round
1982–1983	Tennessee	20–12	9–9	T–4th	NCAA Division I second round
1983–1984	Tennessee	21–14	9–9	6th	NIT quarterfinal
1984–1985	Tennessee	22–15	8–10	T–8th	NIT Third Place
1985–1986	Tennessee	12–16	5–13	8th	–
1986–1987	Tennessee	14–15	7–11	T–9th	–
1987–1988	Tennessee	16–13	9–9	6th	NIT first round
1988–1989	Tennessee	19–11	11–7	T–4th	NCAA Division I first round
Don DeVoe:		204–137 (.598)	107–91 (.540)		
Wade Houston (1989–1994)
1989–1990	Tennessee	16–14	10–8	T–4th	NIT second round
1990–1991	Tennessee	12–22	3–15	T–9th	–
1991–1992	Tennessee	19–15	8–8	3rd (East)	NIT second round
1992–1993	Tennessee	13–17	4–12	6th (East)	–
1993–1994	Tennessee	5–22	2–14	6th (East)	–
Wade Houston:		65–90 (.419)	27–57 (.321)		
Kevin O'Neill (1994–1997)
1994–1995	Tennessee	11–16	4–12	6th (East)	–
1995–1996	Tennessee	14–15	6–10	T–5th (East)	NIT first round
1996–1997	Tennessee	11–16	4–12	6th (East)	–
Kevin O'Neill:		36–47 (.434)	14–24 (.368)		
Jerry Green (1997–2001)
1997–1998	Tennessee	20–9	9–7	3rd (East)	NCAA Division I first round
1998–1999	Tennessee	21–9	12–4	1st (East)	NCAA Division I second round
1999–2000	Tennessee	26–7	12–4	T–1st (East)	NCAA Division I Sweet Sixteen
2000–2001	Tennessee	22–11	8–8	4th (East)	NCAA Division I first round
Jerry Green:		89–36 (.712)	41–23 (.641)		
Buzz Peterson (2001–2005)
2001–2002	Tennessee	15–16	7–9	4th (East)	–
2002–2003	Tennessee	17–12	9–7	4th (East)	NIT first round
2003–2004	Tennessee	15–14	7–9	T–5th (East)	NIT first round
2004–2005	Tennessee	14–17	6–10	5th (East)	–
Buzz Peterson:		61–59 (.508)	29–35 (.453)		
Bruce Pearl (2005–2011)
2005–2006	Tennessee	22–8	12–4	1st (East)	NCAA Division I second round
2006–2007	Tennessee	24–11	10–6	2nd (East)	NCAA Division I Sweet 16
2007–2008	Tennessee	31–5	14–2	1st (East)	NCAA Division I Sweet 16
2008–2009	Tennessee	21–13	10–6	T–1st (East)	NCAA Division I first round
2009–2010	Tennessee	28–9	11–5	3rd (East)	NCAA Division I Elite Eight
2010–2011	Tennessee	19–15	8–8	5th (East)	NCAA Division I first round
Bruce Pearl:		145–61 (.704)	65–31 (.677)		
Cuonzo Martin (2011–2014)
2011–2012	Tennessee	19–15	10–6	T–2nd	NIT second round
2012–2013	Tennessee	20–13	11–7	T–5th	NIT first round
2013–2014	Tennessee	24–13	11–7	4th	NCAA Division I Sweet 16
Cuonzo Martin:		63–41 (.606)	32–20 (.615)		
Donnie Tyndall (2014–2015)
2014–2015	Tennessee	16–16	7–11	10th	–
Donnie Tyndall:		16–16 (.500)	7–11 (.389)		
Rick Barnes (2015–present)
2015–2016	Tennessee	15–19	6–12	12th	–
2016–2017	Tennessee	16–16	8–10	T–9th	–
2017–2018	Tennessee	26–9	13–5	T–1st	NCAA Division I second round
2018–2019	Tennessee	31–6	15–3	T–2nd	NCAA Division I Sweet 16
2019–2020	Tennessee	17–14	9–9	T–8th	Postseason not held due to COVID-19
2020–2021	Tennessee	18–9	10–7	4th	NCAA Division I first round
2021–2022	Tennessee	27–8	14–4	T–2nd	NCAA Division I second round
2022–2023	Tennessee	25–11	11–7	T–4th	NCAA Division I Sweet Sixteen
2023–2024	Tennessee	27–8	14–4	1st	NCAA Division I Elite Eight
2024–2025	Tennessee	30–8	12–6	4th	NCAA Division I Elite Eight
Rick Barnes:		232–107 (.684)	111–66 (.627)		
Total:		1770–1101–2 (.616)			
National champion Postseason invitational champion Conference regular season champion Conference regular season and conference tournament champion Division regular season champion Division regular season and conference tournament champion Conference tournament champion

== Facilities ==
Tennessee plays its home games in Thompson–Boling Arena, which was at one time the largest facility ever built specifically for basketball in the United States, with a seating capacity of 24,678 until its 2007 renovation. Named for the late B. Ray Thompson and former UT President Dr. Edward J. Boling, the arena regularly hosts women's volleyball matches, concerts, camps, conferences, and other special events throughout the year.

Thompson–Boling Arena opened during the 1987–88 season, with Tennessee defeating Marquette 82–56 before a crowd of 25,272. In its opening season, the Volunteers finished third nationally in attendance, with an average attendance of more than 20,000 fans per game. Much of the facility's storied history has centered on men's and women's basketball. In the last two decades, the Volunteers and Lady Volunteers have hosted record college basketball crowds, as well as WNBA and NCAA tournament basketball games. The Volunteers have ranked fourth in the nation in average home attendance for each of the past three seasons, including an average of 20,483 fans per game in 2008–09. Tennessee's 1989 men's game against Kentucky set the SEC regular-season record with a crowd of 25,610. The Lady Volunteers drew 24,597 fans for their 1998 game with Connecticut to establish a women's NCAA record, while a Celtics-Bullets game in 1988 attracted a then-NBA-record exhibition crowd of 23,611. The arena's largest basketball crowd since its capacity was reduced to 21,678 prior to the 2007–08 season came on January 7, 2009, when the Vols hosted Gonzaga in front of a sellout crowd of 22,326.

UT hosted the NCAA tournament's South Regional Finals in 1994 and 1999 in the spacious facility, as well as the 1990 NCAA Southeast Region's first- and second-round games and the NCAA women's 1990 Final Four. The 1989 SEC Tournament was the first of what promised to be many postseason tournaments to be held in Thompson–Boling Arena. The riverfront arena has drawn rave reviews from teams, administrators, and media for its modern facilities needed for hosting major tournaments.

== Postseason ==
=== NCAA tournament results ===
The Volunteers have appeared in the NCAA tournament 27 times. Their combined record is 31–28.

Year	Seed	Round	Opponent	Result
1967		Sweet Sixteen; Regional 3rd Place Game	Dayton; Indiana	L 52–53; L 44–51
1976		Round of 32	VMI	L 75–82
1977		Round of 32	Syracuse	L 88–93 ^{OT}
1979	#8	Round of 40; Round of 32	#9 Eastern Kentucky #1 Notre Dame	W 97–81; L 67–73
1980	#7	Round of 48; Round of 32	#10 Furman #2 Maryland	W 80–69; L 75–86
1981	#4	Round of 32; Sweet Sixteen	#5 VCU #1 Virginia	W 58–56 ^{OT} L 48–62
1982	#9	Round of 48; Second Round	#8 Southwest Louisiana #1 Virginia	W 61–57; L 51–54
1983	#8	Round of 48; Second Round	#9 Marquette #1 Louisville	W 57–56; L 57–70
1989	#10	First Round	#7 West Virginia	L 68–84
1998	#8	First Round	#9 Illinois State	L 81–82 ^{OT}
1999	#4	First Round; Second Round	#13 Delaware #12 SW Missouri State	W 62–52; L 51–81
2000	#4	First Round; Second Round; Sweet Sixteen	#13 Louisiana–Lafayette #5 Connecticut #8 North Carolina	W 63–58; W 65–51; L 69–74
2001	#8	First Round	#9 Charlotte	L 63–70
2006	#2	First Round; Second Round	#15 Winthrop #7 Wichita State	W 63–61; L 73–80
2007	#5	First Round; Second Round; Sweet Sixteen	#12 Long Beach State #4 Virginia #1 Ohio State	W 121–86; W 77–74; L 84–85
2008	#2	First Round; Second Round; Sweet Sixteen	#15 American #7 Butler #3 Louisville	W 72–57; W 76–71 ^{OT} L 60–79
2009	#9	First Round	#8 Oklahoma State	L 75–77
2010	#6	First Round; Second Round; Sweet Sixteen; Elite Eight	#11 San Diego State #14 Ohio #2 Ohio State #5 Michigan State	W 62–59; W 83–68; W 76–73; L 69–70
2011	#9	First Round	#8 Michigan	L 45–75
2014	#11	First Four; First Round; Second Round; Sweet Sixteen	#11 Iowa #6 Massachusetts #14 Mercer #2 Michigan	W 78–65 ^{OT} W 86–67; W 83–63; L 71–73
2018	#3	First Round; Second Round	#14 Wright State #11 Loyola–Chicago	W 73–47; L 62–63
2019	#2	First Round; Second Round; Sweet Sixteen	#15 Colgate #10 Iowa #3 Purdue	W 77–70; W 83–77 ^{OT} L 94–99^{OT}
2021	#5	First Round	#12 Oregon State	L 56–70
2022	#3	First Round; Second Round	#14 Longwood #11 Michigan	W 88–56; L 68–76
2023	#4	First Round; Second Round; Sweet Sixteen	#13 Louisiana #5 Duke #9 Florida Atlantic	W 58–55; W 65–52; L 55–62
2024	#2	First Round; Second Round; Sweet Sixteen; Elite Eight	#15 Saint Peter's #7 Texas #3 Creighton #1 Purdue	W 83–49; W 62–58; W 82–75; L 66–72
2025	#2	First Round; Second Round; Sweet Sixteen; Elite Eight	#15 Wofford #7 UCLA #3 Kentucky #1 Houston	W 77–62; W 67–58; W 78–65; L 50–69

=== NIT results ===
The Volunteers have appeared in the National Invitation Tournament (NIT) 13 times. Their combined record is 13–13.

Year	Round	Opponent	Result
1945	Quarterfinals	Rhode Island	L 44–51
1969	First Round; Quarterfinals; Semifinals; 3rd Place Game	Rutgers; Ohio; Temple; Army	W 67–51; W 75–64; L 58–63; W 64–52
1971	First Round; Quarterfinals	St. John's; Duke	W 84–83; L 64–78
1984	First Round; Quarterfinals	Saint Peter's; Chattanooga; Virginia Tech	W 54–40; W 68–66; L 68–72
1985	First Round; Quarterfinals; Semifinals; 3rd Place Game	Tennessee Tech; Southwestern Louisiana; Virginia; Indiana; Louisville	W 65–62; W 73–72; W 61–54; L 67–74; W 100–84
1988	First Round	Middle Tennessee	L 80–85
1990	First Round; Second Round	Memphis; Vanderbilt	W 73–71; L 85–89
1992	First Round; Second Round	UAB; Virginia	W 71–68; L 52–77
1996	First Round	College of Charleston	L 49–55
2003	First Round	Georgetown	L 60–70
2004	Opening Round	George Mason	L 55–58
2012	First Round; Second Rounds	Savannah State; Middle Tennessee	W 65–51; L 64–71
2013	First Round	Mercer	L 67–75

== Tennessee's All-Americans ==
Player	Position	Year(s)	Selectors
Harry Anderson	Center	1936	Converse Yearbook
Bernie Mehen	Forward	1940†	Converse Yearbook
Gilbert Huffman	Guard	1941†	Converse Yearbook
Richard Mehen	Forward	1942	Pic Magazine
Paul "Lefty" Walther (2)	Forward	1945†, 1949	Don Dunphy, The Sporting News
Garland "Mule" O'Shields	Guard	1946	Helms Athletic Foundation
Ed Weiner	Forward	1955†	Converse Yearbook
Gene Tormohlen	Center	1959	Converse Yearbook
Danny Schultz	Guard	1964	Converse Yearbook
A. W. Davis	Guard	1965†	Converse Yearbook, Helms Athletic Foundation, United States Basketball Writers Association, Associated Press, UPI
Austin "Red" Robbins	Center	1966†	Helms Athletic Foundation
Ron Widby	Forward	1967†	Helms Athletic Foundation, Associated Press, Converse Yearbook, UPI
Tom Boerwinkle	Center	1968†	Helms Athletic Foundation
Bill Justus	Guard	1969†	Helms Athletic Foundation
Jimmy England	Guard	1971†	Helms Athletic Foundation, Basketball News
Bernard King (3)	Forward	1975†, 1976†, 1977†	Converse Yearbook, Helms Athletic Foundation, United States Basketball Writers Association, Associated Press, UPI, NCAA, Basketball Weekly, NACB, The Sporting News
Ernie Grunfeld (2)	Forward	1976†, 1977†	Converse Yearbook, Helms Athletic Foundation, United States Basketball Writers Association, Associated Press, UPI, NACB, The Sporting News, John R. Wooden Award
Reggie Johnson (2)	Center	1979†, 1980†	Helms Athletic Foundation, Converse Yearbook
Howard Wood	Center	1981	Converse Yearbook
Dale Ellis (2)	Forward	1982†, 1983†	Helms Athletic Foundation, Converse Yearbook, NACB, United States Basketball Writers Association, Associated Press, Basketball Times, Basketball Weekly, The Sporting News, John R. Wooden Award, NCAA
Tony White	Guard	1987	Associated Press, UPI
Allan Houston	Guard	1992, 1993	The Sporting News, Associated Press, NACB
Ron Slay	Forward	2003	Associated Press
Chris Lofton (3)	Guard	2006, 2007, 2008†	John R. Wooden Award, The Sporting News, NCAA, Associated Press, Basketball Times, NABC, United States Basketball Writers Association
Grant Williams	Forward	2019†	John R. Wooden Award, The Sporting News, NCAA, Associated Press, Basketball Times, NABC, United States Basketball Writers Association
Dalton Knecht	Forward	2024†	Associated Press, NABC, The Sporting News
†: First Team All-American

== List of retired numbers ==
Tennessee has retired five jersey numbers.

Tennessee Volunteers retired numbers
No.	Player	Position	Career
5	Chris Lofton	PG	2004–2008
14	Dale Ellis	SF / SG	1979–1983
20	Allan Houston	SG	1989–1993
22	Ernie Grunfeld	SG / SF	1973–1977
53	Bernard King	SF	1974–1977
