= 1977–78 William & Mary Indians men's basketball team =

American college basketball season

1977–78 William & Mary Indians men's basketball
- Conference: Independent
- Record: 16–10
- Head coach: Bruce Parkhill (1st season)
- Home arena: William & Mary Hall

1977–78 NCAA Division I men's basketball independents standings
| | Conf. | | | | Overall |
| Team | W | | L | PCT | W | | L | PCT |
|---|---|---|---|---|---|---|---|---|
| No. 3 DePaul | | – | | – | 27 | – | 3 | .900 |
| No. 18 Detroit | | – | | – | 25 | – | 4 | .862 |
| Illinois State | | – | | – | 24 | – | 4 | .857 |
| No. 8 Marquette | | – | | – | 24 | – | 4 | .857 |
| Pan American | | – | | – | 22 | – | 4 | .846 |
| VCU | | – | | – | 24 | – | 5 | .828 |
| Fairfield | | – | | – | 22 | – | 5 | .815 |
| North Texas State | | – | | – | 22 | – | 6 | .786 |
| Syracuse | | – | | – | 22 | – | 6 | .786 |
| Rhode Island | | – | | – | 24 | – | 7 | .774 |
| Providence | | – | | – | 24 | – | 8 | .750 |
| St. John's | | – | | – | 21 | – | 7 | .750 |
| Utah State | | – | | – | 21 | – | 7 | .750 |
| Georgetown | | – | | – | 23 | – | 8 | .742 |
| No. 6 Notre Dame | | – | | – | 23 | – | 8 | .742 |
| Holy Cross | | – | | – | 20 | – | 7 | .741 |
| Northeast Louisiana | | – | | – | 20 | – | 7 | .741 |
| UNC Wilmington | | – | | – | 19 | – | 7 | .731 |
| St. Bonaventure | | – | | – | 21 | – | 8 | .724 |
| UNLV | | – | | – | 20 | – | 8 | .714 |
| Virginia Tech | | – | | – | 19 | – | 8 | .704 |
| James Madison | | – | | – | 18 | – | 8 | .692 |
| Maine | | – | | – | 17 | – | 8 | .680 |
| Army | | – | | – | 19 | – | 9 | .679 |
| Dayton | | – | | – | 19 | – | 10 | .655 |
| St. Francis (NY) | | – | | – | 16 | – | 9 | .640 |
| Iona | | – | | – | 17 | – | 10 | .630 |
| William & Mary | | – | | – | 16 | – | 10 | .615 |
| Air Force | | – | | – | 15 | – | 10 | .600 |
| Loyola (IL) | | – | | – | 16 | – | 11 | .593 |
| Mercer | | – | | – | 16 | – | 11 | .593 |
| Oklahoma City | | – | | – | 16 | – | 11 | .593 |
| Seton Hall | | – | | – | 16 | – | 11 | .593 |
| Boston College | | – | | – | 15 | – | 11 | .577 |
| Butler | | – | | – | 15 | – | 11 | .577 |
| Saint Francis (PA) | | – | | – | 15 | – | 11 | .577 |
| South Carolina | | – | | – | 16 | – | 12 | .571 |
| Siena | | – | | – | 13 | – | 10 | .565 |
| Navy | | – | | – | 14 | – | 11 | .560 |
| Milwaukee | | – | | – | 15 | – | 12 | .556 |
| Niagara | | – | | – | 14 | – | 12 | .538 |
| Northeastern | | – | | – | 14 | – | 12 | .538 |
| Southern Mississippi | | – | | – | 13 | – | 12 | .520 |
| Portland State | | – | | – | 14 | – | 13 | .519 |
| Stetson | | – | | – | 14 | – | 13 | .519 |
| Oral Roberts | | – | | – | 13 | – | 14 | .481 |
| Xavier | | – | | – | 13 | – | 14 | .481 |
| Cleveland State | | – | | – | 12 | – | 13 | .480 |
| Tennessee State | | – | | – | 11 | – | 12 | .478 |
| Catholic | | – | | – | 12 | – | 14 | .462 |
| Manhattan | | – | | – | 12 | – | 14 | .462 |
| Georgia Southern | | – | | – | 12 | – | 15 | .444 |
| Northwestern State | | – | | – | 12 | – | 15 | .444 |
| Connecticut | | – | | – | 11 | – | 15 | .423 |
| Old Dominion | | – | | – | 11 | – | 15 | .423 |
| Vermont | | – | | – | 11 | – | 15 | .423 |
| Boston University | | – | | – | 10 | – | 15 | .400 |
| Hardin–Simmons | | – | | – | 10 | – | 16 | .385 |
| Campbell | | – | | – | 9 | – | 15 | .375 |
| Centenary (LA) | | – | | – | 10 | – | 17 | .370 |
| Denver | | – | | – | 10 | – | 17 | .370 |
| Colgate | | – | | – | 9 | – | 17 | .346 |
| East Carolina | | – | | – | 9 | – | 17 | .346 |
| Fordham | | – | | – | 8 | – | 18 | .308 |
| Long Island | | – | | – | 8 | – | 18 | .308 |
| Saint Peter's | | – | | – | 8 | – | 18 | .308 |
| Baptist | | – | | – | 8 | – | 19 | .296 |
| Samford | | – | | – | 8 | – | 19 | .296 |
| Canisius | | – | | – | 7 | – | 19 | .269 |
| Houston Baptist | | – | | – | 7 | – | 19 | .269 |
| New Hampshire | | – | | – | 7 | – | 19 | .269 |
| Wagner | | – | | – | 7 | – | 19 | .269 |
| Evansville | | – | | – | 1 | – | 3 | .250 |
| Fairleigh Dickinson | | – | | – | 6 | – | 18 | .250 |
| Valparaiso | | – | | – | 6 | – | 19 | .240 |
| Robert Morris | | – | | – | 4 | – | 19 | .174 |
| Richmond | | – | | – | 4 | – | 22 | .154 |
| Hawaii | | – | | – | 1 | – | 26 | .037 |
Rankings from AP Poll

The 1977–78 William & Mary Indians men's basketball team represented the College of William & Mary in intercollegiate basketball during the 1977–78 season. Under the first year of head coach Bruce Parkhill, the team finished the season 16–10. This was the 73rd season of the collegiate basketball program at William & Mary, whose nickname is now the Tribe.

After playing as members of the Southern Conference for the previous 41 season, William & Mary became an Independent.

Additionally, this was the final season of William & Mary's athletics teams bearing the Indian nickname. The following season, the college's athletic teams became the Tribe.

== Schedule ==
| Date time, TV | Rank^{#} | Opponent^{#} | Result | Record | Site city, state |
Regular season
| 11/25/1977* | | vs. VCU; Spider Classic | W 55–44 | 1–0 | Robins Center; Richmond, Virginia |
| 11/26/1977* | | vs. Saint Joseph's; Spider Classic | L 60–69 | 1–1 | Robins Center; Richmond, Virginia |
| 11/28/1977* | | Christopher Newport | W 86–68 | 2–1 | William & Mary Hall; Williamsburg, Virginia |
| 11/30/1977* | | West Virginia | W 72–61 | 3–1 | William & Mary Hall; Williamsburg, Virginia |
| 12/3/1977* | | Radford | W 72–61 | 4–1 | William & Mary Hall; Williamsburg, Virginia |
| 12/7/1977* | | No. 2 North Carolina | W 78–75 | 5–1 | William & Mary Hall; Williamsburg, Virginia |
| 12/9/1977* | | vs. Cal State Fullerton; Cougar Classic | W 67–62 | 6–1 | Marriott Center; Provo, Utah |
| 12/10/1977* | | vs. Montana; Cougar Classic | W 61–60 | 7–1 | Marriott Center; Provo, Utah |
| 12/28/1977* | | at Stetson; Tangerine Bowl | W 61–60 | 8–1 | Edmunds Center; DeLand, Florida |
| 12/29/1977* | | vs. Rollins; Tangerine Bowl | W 79–66 | 9–1 | Edmunds Center; DeLand, Florida |
| 1/7/1978* | | East Carolina | L 56–58 | 9–2 | William & Mary Hall; Williamsburg, Virginia |
| 1/10/1978* | | at Rutgers | L 71–79 | 9–3 | Rutgers Athletic Center; Piscataway, New Jersey |
| 1/14/1978* | | Richmond | W 75–43 | 10–3 | William & Mary Hall; Williamsburg, Virginia |
| 1/17/1978* | | at East Carolina | W 77–76 | 11–3 | Williams Arena at Minges Coliseum; Greenville, North Carolina |
| 1/21/1978* | | American | L 67–73 | 11–4 | William & Mary Hall; Williamsburg, Virginia |
| 1/25/1978* | | at Davidson | W 65–56 | 12–4 | Johnston Gym; Davidson, North Carolina |
| 1/28/1978* | | at Old Dominion | L 63–64 | 12–5 | ODU Fieldhouse; Norfolk, Virginia |
| 2/1/1978* | | VCU | L 62–73 | 12–6 | William & Mary Hall; Williamsburg, Virginia |
| 2/4/1978* | | George Mason | W 94–73 | 13–6 | William & Mary Hall; Williamsburg, Virginia |
| 2/7/1978* | | at Navy | W 70–62 | 14–6 | Halsey Field House; Annapolis, Maryland |
| 2/11/1978* | | James Madison | L 66–68 | 14–7 | William & Mary Hall; Williamsburg, Virginia |
| 2/15/1978* | | vs. VMI | L 59–60 | 14–8 | Holland Hall Gymnasium; Hampton, Virginia |
| 2/18/1978* | | at Richmond | W 59–48 | 15–8 | Robins Center; Richmond, Virginia |
| 2/20/1978* | | No. 17 Virginia | L 49–62 | 15–9 | William & Mary Hall; Williamsburg, Virginia |
| 2/22/1978* | | at South Carolina | L 54–67 | 15–10 | Carolina Coliseum; Columbia, South Carolina |
| 2/25/1978* | | Old Dominion | W 75–64 | 16–10 | William & Mary Hall; Williamsburg, Virginia |
*Non-conference game. ^{#}Rankings from AP Poll. (#) Tournament seedings in parentheses.
