= 1977–78 Providence Friars men's basketball team =

American college basketball season

1977–78 Providence Friars men's basketball

NCAA Tournament, first round
- Conference: Independent
- Record: 24–8
- Head coach: Dave Gavitt (9th season)
- Home arena: Providence Civic Center

1977–78 NCAA Division I men's basketball independents standings
	Conf.				Overall
Team	W		L	PCT	W		L	PCT
No. 3 DePaul		–		–	27	–	3	.900
No. 18 Detroit		–		–	25	–	4	.862
Illinois State		–		–	24	–	4	.857
No. 8 Marquette		–		–	24	–	4	.857
Pan American		–		–	22	–	4	.846
VCU		–		–	24	–	5	.828
Fairfield		–		–	22	–	5	.815
North Texas State		–		–	22	–	6	.786
Syracuse		–		–	22	–	6	.786
Rhode Island		–		–	24	–	7	.774
Providence		–		–	24	–	8	.750
St. John's		–		–	21	–	7	.750
Utah State		–		–	21	–	7	.750
Georgetown		–		–	23	–	8	.742
No. 6 Notre Dame		–		–	23	–	8	.742
Holy Cross		–		–	20	–	7	.741
Northeast Louisiana		–		–	20	–	7	.741
UNC Wilmington		–		–	19	–	7	.731
St. Bonaventure		–		–	21	–	8	.724
UNLV		–		–	20	–	8	.714
Virginia Tech		–		–	19	–	8	.704
James Madison		–		–	18	–	8	.692
Maine		–		–	17	–	8	.680
Army		–		–	19	–	9	.679
Dayton		–		–	19	–	10	.655
St. Francis (NY)		–		–	16	–	9	.640
Iona		–		–	17	–	10	.630
William & Mary		–		–	16	–	10	.615
Air Force		–		–	15	–	10	.600
Loyola (IL)		–		–	16	–	11	.593
Mercer		–		–	16	–	11	.593
Oklahoma City		–		–	16	–	11	.593
Seton Hall		–		–	16	–	11	.593
Boston College		–		–	15	–	11	.577
Butler		–		–	15	–	11	.577
Saint Francis (PA)		–		–	15	–	11	.577
South Carolina		–		–	16	–	12	.571
Siena		–		–	13	–	10	.565
Navy		–		–	14	–	11	.560
Milwaukee		–		–	15	–	12	.556
Niagara		–		–	14	–	12	.538
Northeastern		–		–	14	–	12	.538
Southern Mississippi		–		–	13	–	12	.520
Portland State		–		–	14	–	13	.519
Stetson		–		–	14	–	13	.519
Oral Roberts		–		–	13	–	14	.481
Xavier		–		–	13	–	14	.481
Cleveland State		–		–	12	–	13	.480
Tennessee State		–		–	11	–	12	.478
Catholic		–		–	12	–	14	.462
Manhattan		–		–	12	–	14	.462
Georgia Southern		–		–	12	–	15	.444
Northwestern State		–		–	12	–	15	.444
Connecticut		–		–	11	–	15	.423
Old Dominion		–		–	11	–	15	.423
Vermont		–		–	11	–	15	.423
Boston University		–		–	10	–	15	.400
Hardin–Simmons		–		–	10	–	16	.385
Campbell		–		–	9	–	15	.375
Centenary (LA)		–		–	10	–	17	.370
Denver		–		–	10	–	17	.370
Colgate		–		–	9	–	17	.346
East Carolina		–		–	9	–	17	.346
Fordham		–		–	8	–	18	.308
Long Island		–		–	8	–	18	.308
Saint Peter's		–		–	8	–	18	.308
Baptist		–		–	8	–	19	.296
Samford		–		–	8	–	19	.296
Canisius		–		–	7	–	19	.269
Houston Baptist		–		–	7	–	19	.269
New Hampshire		–		–	7	–	19	.269
Wagner		–		–	7	–	19	.269
Evansville		–		–	1	–	3	.250
Fairleigh Dickinson		–		–	6	–	18	.250
Valparaiso		–		–	6	–	19	.240
Robert Morris		–		–	4	–	19	.174
Richmond		–		–	4	–	22	.154
Hawaii		–		–	1	–	26	.037
Rankings from AP Poll

The 1977–78 Providence Friars men's basketball team represented Providence College during the 1977–78 NCAA Division I men's basketball season.

The Friars would receive an at-large bid into the NCAA Tournament where they would fall in the first round to Michigan State.

== Roster ==
1977–78 Providence Friars men's basketball team
Players
Coaches

Pos.	#	Name	Height	Weight	Year	Hometown
F	23	Bruce Campbell	6 ft 9 in (2.06 m)	210 lb (95 kg)	Sr	New Haven, Connecticut
C	31	Bob Misevicius	6 ft 9 in (2.06 m)	—	Sr	Ozone Park, New York
G	30	Paul Aiello	6 ft 5 in (1.96 m)	175 lb (79 kg)	So	Johnston, Rhode Island
F	20	Ernie DelGatto	6 ft 5 in (1.96 m)	205 lb (93 kg)	Fr	Bronx, New York
F	12	Bill Eason	6 ft 5 in (1.96 m)	180 lb (82 kg)	Sr	Waterbury, Connecticut
F	34	Mladen Filipan	6 ft 8 in (2.03 m)	215 lb (98 kg)	Fr	Zagreb
G	11	Dave Frye	6 ft 0 in (1.83 m)	155 lb (70 kg)	Jr	Greensburg, Pennsylvania
C	32	Rich Hunger	6 ft 9 in (2.06 m)	210 lb (95 kg)	Fr	Saint-Laurent, Quebec
C	24	Pat Kehoe	6 ft 7 in (2.01 m)	240 lb (109 kg)	Sr	Landover, Maryland
G	15	Joe Mullaney	5 ft 11 in (1.8 m)	175 lb (79 kg)	Sr	Baltimore, Maryland
G	14	John Nolan	6 ft 3 in (1.91 m)	185 lb (84 kg)	So	Woodside, New York
G	25	Paul Oristaglio	6 ft 0 in (1.83 m)	160 lb (73 kg)	Sr	Broomall, Pennsylvania
F	5	Jerry Scott	6 ft 3 in (1.91 m)	170 lb (77 kg)	Fr	Cambridge, Massachusetts
G	10	Dwight Williams	6 ft 0 in (1.83 m)	175 lb (79 kg)	Jr	Buffalo, New York
F	22	Rudy Williams	6 ft 7 in (2.01 m)	215 lb (98 kg)	Fr	Cambridge, Massachusetts

Head coach

- Dave Gavitt

Assistant coach(es)

Legend

- (C) Team captain
- (S) Suspended
- (I) Ineligible
- (W) Walk-on
- Injured
- Current redshirt

== Schedule and results ==
Date time, TV	Rank^{#}	Opponent^{#}	Result	Record	Site city, state
Regular season
Nov 28, 1977*		Stonehill	W 84–66	1–0	Providence Civic Center (7,802); Providence, Rhode Island
Nov 30, 1977*		No. 9 Louisville	W 57–51	2–0	Providence Civic Center (11,134); Providence, Rhode Island
Dec 3, 1977*		vs. Seton Hall	W 60–58	3–0	Madison Square Garden (5,199); New York, New York
Dec 6, 1977*	No. 20	Assumption	W 79–70	4–0	Providence Civic Center (7,942); Providence, Rhode Island
Dec 9, 1977*	No. 20	Wisconsin	W 73–62	5–0	Providence Civic Center (9,842); Providence, Rhode Island
Dec 22, 1977*	No. 14	Cal State Bakersfield	W 72–70	6–0	Providence Civic Center (7,695); Providence, Rhode Island
Dec 27, 1977*	No. 13	vs. Lafayette; Rainbow Classic	W 70–59	7–0	Neal S. Blaisdell Center; Honolulu, Hawaii
Dec 29, 1977*	No. 13	vs. Stanford; Rainbow Classic	L 61–76	7–1	Neal S. Blaisdell Center (5,257); Honolulu, Hawaii
Dec 30, 1977*	No. 13	vs. Texas Tech; Rainbow Classic	W 53–52	8–1	Neal S. Blaisdell Center; Honolulu, Hawaii
Jan 5, 1978*	No. 17	at Brown	W 68–52	9–1	Providence Civic Center (3,000); Providence, Rhode Island
Jan 7, 1978*	No. 17	Canisius	W 82–72	10–1	Providence Civic Center (9,042); Providence, Rhode Island
Jan 9, 1978*	No. 17	Brown	W 76–58	11–1	Providence Civic Center (7,190); Providence, Rhode Island
Jan 11, 1978*	No. 14	at Saint Joseph's	W 76–69	12–1	Alumni Memorial Fieldhouse (5,578); Philadelphia, Pennsylvania
Jan 14, 1978*	No. 14	Penn	W 67–65	13–1	Providence Civic Center (8,124); Providence, Rhode Island
Jan 18, 1978*	No. 12	No. 14 Holy Cross	W 90–64	14–1	Providence Civic Center (12,150); Providence, Rhode Island
Jan 21, 1978*	No. 12	vs. Connecticut	W 57–47	15–1	New Haven Coliseum (4,900); New Haven, Connecticut
Jan 25, 1978*	No. 9	at Massachusetts	W 50–49	16–1	Curry Hicks Cage (5,950); Amherst, Massachusetts
Jan 28, 1978*	No. 9	at No. 19 DePaul	L 68–78	16–2	Alumni Hall (5,300); Chicago, Illinois
Jan 31, 1978*	No. 16	Villanova	L 66–73	16–3	Providence Civic Center (10,229); Providence, Rhode Island
Feb 2, 1978*	No. 16	at St. Bonaventure	L 64–72	16–4	Reilly Center (5,289); St. Bonaventure, New York
Feb 4, 1978*	No. 16	Rhode Island	W 79–59	17–4	Providence Civic Center (12,022); Providence, Rhode Island
Feb 12, 1978*	No. 20	No. 7 North Carolina	W 61–59	18–4	Providence Civic Center (6,863); Providence, Rhode Island
Feb 14, 1978*	No. 13	Niagara	W 72–70 ^{OT}	19–4	Providence Civic Center (8,011); Providence, Rhode Island
Feb 16, 1978*	No. 13	Jacksonville	W 52–50 ^{OT}	20–4	Providence Civic Center (8,011); Providence, Rhode Island
Feb 18, 1978*	No. 13	Campbell	W 63–54	21–4	Providence Civic Center (6,113); Providence, Rhode Island
Feb 19, 1978*	No. 13	Boston College	W 92–74	22–4	Providence Civic Center (9,549); Providence, Rhode Island
Feb 21, 1978*	No. 11	at Rhode Island	L 64–73	22–5	Providence Civic Center (12,150); Providence, Rhode Island
Feb 25, 1978*	No. 11	St. John's	L 51–60	22–6	Providence Civic Center (9,973); Providence, Rhode Island
Feb 27, 1978*	No. 11	Long Island	W 85–62	23–6	Providence Civic Center (7,982); Providence, Rhode Island
Mar 2, 1978*	No. 18	Holy Cross; ECAC New England Regionals	W 71–67	24–6	Providence Civic Center (12,150); Providence, Rhode Island
Mar 4, 1978*	No. 18	vs. Rhode Island; ECAC New England Regionals	L 62–65	24–7	Providence Civic Center (12,150); Providence, Rhode Island
NCAA tournament
Mar 11, 1978*	(ME 3L)	vs. (ME 1Q) No. 6 Michigan State; First round	L 63–77	24–8	Market Square Arena (16,519); Indianapolis, Indiana
*Non-conference game. ^{#}Rankings from AP poll. (#) Tournament seedings in parentheses. ME=Mideast. All times are in Eastern Time.
