= 1977–78 Syracuse Orangemen basketball team =

American college basketball season

1977–78 Syracuse Orangemen basketball

NCAA Men's Division I Tournament, First Round
- Conference: Independent
- Record: 22–6
- Head coach: Jim Boeheim (2nd season)
- Assistant coach: Rick Pitino (2nd season)
- Home arena: Manley Field House

1977–78 NCAA Division I men's basketball independents standings
	Conf.				Overall
Team	W		L	PCT	W		L	PCT
No. 3 DePaul		–		–	27	–	3	.900
No. 18 Detroit		–		–	25	–	4	.862
Illinois State		–		–	24	–	4	.857
No. 8 Marquette		–		–	24	–	4	.857
Pan American		–		–	22	–	4	.846
VCU		–		–	24	–	5	.828
Fairfield		–		–	22	–	5	.815
North Texas State		–		–	22	–	6	.786
Syracuse		–		–	22	–	6	.786
Rhode Island		–		–	24	–	7	.774
Providence		–		–	24	–	8	.750
St. John's		–		–	21	–	7	.750
Utah State		–		–	21	–	7	.750
Georgetown		–		–	23	–	8	.742
No. 6 Notre Dame		–		–	23	–	8	.742
Holy Cross		–		–	20	–	7	.741
Northeast Louisiana		–		–	20	–	7	.741
UNC Wilmington		–		–	19	–	7	.731
St. Bonaventure		–		–	21	–	8	.724
UNLV		–		–	20	–	8	.714
Virginia Tech		–		–	19	–	8	.704
James Madison		–		–	18	–	8	.692
Maine		–		–	17	–	8	.680
Army		–		–	19	–	9	.679
Dayton		–		–	19	–	10	.655
St. Francis (NY)		–		–	16	–	9	.640
Iona		–		–	17	–	10	.630
William & Mary		–		–	16	–	10	.615
Air Force		–		–	15	–	10	.600
Loyola (IL)		–		–	16	–	11	.593
Mercer		–		–	16	–	11	.593
Oklahoma City		–		–	16	–	11	.593
Seton Hall		–		–	16	–	11	.593
Boston College		–		–	15	–	11	.577
Butler		–		–	15	–	11	.577
Saint Francis (PA)		–		–	15	–	11	.577
South Carolina		–		–	16	–	12	.571
Siena		–		–	13	–	10	.565
Navy		–		–	14	–	11	.560
Milwaukee		–		–	15	–	12	.556
Niagara		–		–	14	–	12	.538
Northeastern		–		–	14	–	12	.538
Southern Mississippi		–		–	13	–	12	.520
Portland State		–		–	14	–	13	.519
Stetson		–		–	14	–	13	.519
Oral Roberts		–		–	13	–	14	.481
Xavier		–		–	13	–	14	.481
Cleveland State		–		–	12	–	13	.480
Tennessee State		–		–	11	–	12	.478
Catholic		–		–	12	–	14	.462
Manhattan		–		–	12	–	14	.462
Georgia Southern		–		–	12	–	15	.444
Northwestern State		–		–	12	–	15	.444
Connecticut		–		–	11	–	15	.423
Old Dominion		–		–	11	–	15	.423
Vermont		–		–	11	–	15	.423
Boston University		–		–	10	–	15	.400
Hardin–Simmons		–		–	10	–	16	.385
Campbell		–		–	9	–	15	.375
Centenary (LA)		–		–	10	–	17	.370
Denver		–		–	10	–	17	.370
Colgate		–		–	9	–	17	.346
East Carolina		–		–	9	–	17	.346
Fordham		–		–	8	–	18	.308
Long Island		–		–	8	–	18	.308
Saint Peter's		–		–	8	–	18	.308
Baptist		–		–	8	–	19	.296
Samford		–		–	8	–	19	.296
Canisius		–		–	7	–	19	.269
Houston Baptist		–		–	7	–	19	.269
New Hampshire		–		–	7	–	19	.269
Wagner		–		–	7	–	19	.269
Evansville		–		–	1	–	3	.250
Fairleigh Dickinson		–		–	6	–	18	.250
Valparaiso		–		–	6	–	19	.240
Robert Morris		–		–	4	–	19	.174
Richmond		–		–	4	–	22	.154
Hawaii		–		–	1	–	26	.037
Rankings from AP Poll

The 1977–78 Syracuse Orangemen men's basketball team represented Syracuse University as an independent during the 1977–78 NCAA Division I men's basketball season. Led by second-year head coach Jim Boeheim, the Orangemen compiled a record of 22–6. Syracuse received an at-large bid to the 1978 NCAA Division I Basketball Tournament, where they lost in the first round of the Mideast Regionals to Western Kentucky.

== Roster ==
1977–78 Syracuse Orangemen men's basketball team
Players
Coaches

Pos.	#	Name	Height	Weight	Year	Hometown
F/C	44	Marty Byrnes	6 ft 7 in (2.01 m)	210 lb (95 kg)	Sr	Pittsford, New York
C	50	Roosevelt Bouie	6 ft 11 in (2.11 m)	215 lb (98 kg)	So	Kendall, New York
F	55	Louis Orr	6 ft 8 in (2.03 m)	175 lb (79 kg)	So	Cincinnati, Ohio
C		Danny Schayes	6 ft 11 in (2.11 m)	—	Fr	DeWitt, New York

Head coach

- Jim Boeheim

Assistant coach(es)

- Rick Pitino

Legend

- (C) Team captain
- (S) Suspended
- (I) Ineligible
- (W) Walk-on
- Injured
- Current redshirt

== Schedule ==
Date time, TV	Rank^{#}	Opponent^{#}	Result	Record	Site city, state
November 26		Cornell	W 88–61	1–0	Manley Field House; Syracuse, NY
November 28		at Dayton	L 67–76	1–1	University of Dayton Arena; Dayton, Ohio
November 30		Connecticut; Rivalry	W 101–61	2–1	Manley Field House; Syracuse, NY
December 2		Le Moyne; Carrier Classic	W 90–62	3–1	Manley Field House; Syracuse, NY
December 3	No. 12	Michigan State; Carrier Classic	W 75–67	4–1	Manley Field House; Syracuse, NY
December 7		at Colgate	W 99–50	5–1	Cotterell Court; Hamilton, NY
December 10	No. 18	St. Bonaventure	W 107–81	6–1	Manley Field House; Syracuse, NY
December 14	No. 12	at American	W 85–67	7–1	Fort Myer Ceremony Hall; Arlington, Virginia
December 16	No. 12	Penn State	W 81–45	8–1	Manley Field House; Syracuse, NY
December 29	No. 10	vs. Mississippi State; Lobo Invitational	W 76–66	9–1	The Pitt; Albuquerque, NM
December 30	No. 10	at New Mexico; Lobo Invitational	W 96–91	10–1	The Pitt (18,644); Albuquerque, NM
January 3		North Texas	W 94–84	11–1	Manley Field House; Syracuse, NY
January 11	No. 8	at Penn State	W 83–77	12–1	Rec Hall; University Park, Pennsylvania
January 14		at Pittsburgh	L 81–86	12–2	Fitzgerald Field House; Pittsburgh, Pennsylvania
January 19	No. 11	La Salle	W 106–96	13–2	Manley Field House; Syracuse, NY
January 25		Temple	W 91–66	14–2	Manley Field House; Syracuse, NY
January 28		at Rutgers	L 73–77	14–3	Rutgers Athletic Center; Piscataway, NJ
January 30		at Virginia Tech	L 71–87	14–4	Cassell Coliseum; Blacksburg, Virginia
February 1		Siena	W 100–73	15–4	Manley Field House; Syracuse, NY
February 11		at West Virginia	W 74–73	16–4	WVU Coliseum; Morgantown, WV
February 15		Buffalo	W 113–66	17–4	Manley Field House; Syracuse, NY
February 18	No. 16	at St. John's	W 77–66	18–4	Alumni Hall; Queens, NY
February 20		Fordham	W 109–62	19–4	Manley Field House; Syracuse, NY
February 22		at Niagara	W 70–69	20–4	Niagara University Student Center; Niagara, NY
February 25		Boston College	W 97–80	21–4	Manley Field House; Syracuse, NY
February 27		Canisius	W 100–59	22–4	Manley Field House; Syracuse, NY
March 1		vs. St. Bonaventure	L 69–70	22–5	Rochester War Memorial; Rochester, NY
March 11	(2L ME)	vs. (4Q ME) Western Kentucky; NCAA Tournament • First Round	L 86–87 ^{OT}	22–6	Stokely Athletic Center (12,700); Knoxville, Tennessee
*Non-conference game. ^{#}Rankings from AP Poll. (#) Tournament seedings in parentheses. All times are in Eastern Time.
