= 1977–78 St. John's Redmen basketball team =

American college basketball season

1977–78 St. John's Redmen men's basketball

Lapchick Memorial Champions ECAC Metro tournament Champions

1978 NCAA tournament, First round
- Conference: Independent
- Record: 21–7
- Head coach: Lou Carnesecca
- Assistant coaches: John Kresse; Brian Mahoney
- Captain: George Johnson
- Home arena: Alumni Hall; Madison Square Garden

1977–78 NCAA Division I men's basketball independents standings
	Conf.				Overall
Team	W		L	PCT	W		L	PCT
No. 3 DePaul		–		–	27	–	3	.900
No. 18 Detroit		–		–	25	–	4	.862
Illinois State		–		–	24	–	4	.857
No. 8 Marquette		–		–	24	–	4	.857
Pan American		–		–	22	–	4	.846
VCU		–		–	24	–	5	.828
Fairfield		–		–	22	–	5	.815
North Texas State		–		–	22	–	6	.786
Syracuse		–		–	22	–	6	.786
Rhode Island		–		–	24	–	7	.774
Providence		–		–	24	–	8	.750
St. John's		–		–	21	–	7	.750
Utah State		–		–	21	–	7	.750
Georgetown		–		–	23	–	8	.742
No. 6 Notre Dame		–		–	23	–	8	.742
Holy Cross		–		–	20	–	7	.741
Northeast Louisiana		–		–	20	–	7	.741
UNC Wilmington		–		–	19	–	7	.731
St. Bonaventure		–		–	21	–	8	.724
UNLV		–		–	20	–	8	.714
Virginia Tech		–		–	19	–	8	.704
James Madison		–		–	18	–	8	.692
Maine		–		–	17	–	8	.680
Army		–		–	19	–	9	.679
Dayton		–		–	19	–	10	.655
St. Francis (NY)		–		–	16	–	9	.640
Iona		–		–	17	–	10	.630
William & Mary		–		–	16	–	10	.615
Air Force		–		–	15	–	10	.600
Loyola (IL)		–		–	16	–	11	.593
Mercer		–		–	16	–	11	.593
Oklahoma City		–		–	16	–	11	.593
Seton Hall		–		–	16	–	11	.593
Boston College		–		–	15	–	11	.577
Butler		–		–	15	–	11	.577
Saint Francis (PA)		–		–	15	–	11	.577
South Carolina		–		–	16	–	12	.571
Siena		–		–	13	–	10	.565
Navy		–		–	14	–	11	.560
Milwaukee		–		–	15	–	12	.556
Niagara		–		–	14	–	12	.538
Northeastern		–		–	14	–	12	.538
Southern Mississippi		–		–	13	–	12	.520
Portland State		–		–	14	–	13	.519
Stetson		–		–	14	–	13	.519
Oral Roberts		–		–	13	–	14	.481
Xavier		–		–	13	–	14	.481
Cleveland State		–		–	12	–	13	.480
Tennessee State		–		–	11	–	12	.478
Catholic		–		–	12	–	14	.462
Manhattan		–		–	12	–	14	.462
Georgia Southern		–		–	12	–	15	.444
Northwestern State		–		–	12	–	15	.444
Connecticut		–		–	11	–	15	.423
Old Dominion		–		–	11	–	15	.423
Vermont		–		–	11	–	15	.423
Boston University		–		–	10	–	15	.400
Hardin–Simmons		–		–	10	–	16	.385
Campbell		–		–	9	–	15	.375
Centenary (LA)		–		–	10	–	17	.370
Denver		–		–	10	–	17	.370
Colgate		–		–	9	–	17	.346
East Carolina		–		–	9	–	17	.346
Fordham		–		–	8	–	18	.308
Long Island		–		–	8	–	18	.308
Saint Peter's		–		–	8	–	18	.308
Baptist		–		–	8	–	19	.296
Samford		–		–	8	–	19	.296
Canisius		–		–	7	–	19	.269
Houston Baptist		–		–	7	–	19	.269
New Hampshire		–		–	7	–	19	.269
Wagner		–		–	7	–	19	.269
Evansville		–		–	1	–	3	.250
Fairleigh Dickinson		–		–	6	–	18	.250
Valparaiso		–		–	6	–	19	.240
Robert Morris		–		–	4	–	19	.174
Richmond		–		–	4	–	22	.154
Hawaii		–		–	1	–	26	.037
Rankings from AP Poll

The 1977–78 St. John's Redmen basketball team represented St. John's University during the 1977–78 NCAA Division I men's basketball season. The team was coached by Lou Carnesecca in his tenth year at the school. St. John's home games are played at Alumni Hall and Madison Square Garden.

The Redmen won the ECAC Metro tournament after beating Army in the final.

== Roster ==
1977–78 St. John's Red Storm men's basketball team
Players
Coaches

Pos.	#	Name	Height	Weight	Year	Previous school	Hometown
G/F	-	Kevelin Winfree	6 ft 5 in (1.96 m)	—	Sr	Alexander Hamilton	Brooklyn, NY
G	4	Tom Calabrese	6 ft 0 in (1.83 m)	—	Jr	Cliffside Park	Cliffside Park, NJ
G	5	Bernard Rencher	6 ft 1 in (1.85 m)	—	RS So	Mater Christi/Notre Dame	Elmhurst, NY
G/F	22	Ron Plair	6 ft 4 in (1.93 m)	—	Fr	William C. Bryant	Queens, NY
F	24	George Johnson (C)	6 ft 7 in (2.01 m)	—	Sr	New Utrecht	Brooklyn, NY
G/F	32	Gordon Thomas	6 ft 4 in (1.93 m)	—	Jr	Bay Shore	Bay Shore, NY
C	33	Paul Berwanger	6 ft 10 in (2.08 m)	—	RS Sr	Cornwall Central/Boston College	Cornwall, NY
G	35	Reggie Carter	6 ft 3 in (1.91 m)	—	RS So	Long Island Lutheran/Hawaii	New York, NY
F	43	Frank Gilroy	6 ft 6 in (1.98 m)	—	Fr	Holy Cross	Queens, NY
F	44	Rudy Wright	6 ft 7 in (2.01 m)	—	Jr	Long Island City	Queens, NY
C	55	Wayne McKoy	6 ft 9 in (2.06 m)	—	Fr	Long Island Lutheran	Queens, NY

Head coach

- Lou Carnesecca (St. John's, '50)

Assistant coach(es)

- John Kresse (St. John's, '64)
- Brian Mahoney (Manhattan, '71)

Legend

- (C) Team captain
- (S) Suspended
- (I) Ineligible
- (W) Walk-on
- Injured
- Current redshirt

== Schedule and results ==
Date time, TV	Rank^{#}	Opponent^{#}	Result	Record	Site city, state
Exhibition
11/20/77*	No. 20	Soviet Union National Team	W 72-70 ^{OT}		Alumni Hall; Queens, NY
Regular season
11/25/77*	No. 20	Lafayette; Lapchick Tournament Opening Round	W 66-60	1-0	Alumni Hall; Queens, NY
11/26/77*	No. 20	Old Dominion; Lapchick tournament championship	W 81-70	2-0	Alumni Hall; Queens, NY
11/29/77*	No. 16	at Vanderbilt	W 59-54	3-0	Memorial Gymnasium; Nashville, TN
12/03/77*	No. 16	at Princeton	W 43-40	4-0	Jadwin Gymnasium; Princeton, NJ
12/06/77*	No. 13	Army	W 73-60	5-0	Alumni Hall; Queens, NY
12/10/77*	No. 13	at Rutgers	L 61-72	5-1	Rutgers Athletic Center; New Brunswick, NJ
12/13/77*		Columbia	W 67-56	6-1	Alumni Hall; Queens, NY
12/16/77*		vs. Seattle; Kentucky Invitational Semifinal	W 77-60	7-1	Rupp Arena; Lexington, KY
12/17/77*		at No. 1 Kentucky; Kentucky Invitational Championship	L 72-102	7-2	Rupp Arena; Lexington, KY
12/28/77*		vs. Georgia Tech; Maryland Invitational Semifinal	L 67-73	7-3	Cole Field House; College Park, MD
12/29/77*		vs. Western Kentucky; Maryland Invitational Consolation	W 80-63	8-3	Cole Field House; College Park, MD
01/04/78*		Seton Hall	W 87-86 ^{OT}	9-3	Alumni Hall; Queens, NY
01/07/78*		at No. 20 Georgetown	L 61-72	9-4	McDonough Gymnasium; Washington, D.C.
01/11/78*		Fordham	W 97-56	10-4	Alumni Hall; Queens, NY
01/14/78*		at Boston College	W 76-54	11-4	Roberts Center; Chestnut Hill, MA
01/24/78*		Manhattan	W 69-63	12-4	Alumni Hall; Queens, NY
01/28/78*		Villanova	W 65-64	13-4	Alumni Hall; Queens, NY
01/30/78*		Davidson	W 79-67	14-4	Alumni Hall; Queens, NY
02/02/78*		Cincinnati	W 75-66	15-4	Madison Square Garden; New York, NY
02/11/78*		Duquesne	W 84-69	16-4	Madison Square Garden; New York, NY
02/15/78*		at Temple	L 65-75	16-5	The Palestra; Philadelphia, PA
02/18/78*		No. 16 Syracuse	L 65-77	16-6	Alumni Hall; Queens, NY
02/23/78*		St. Joseph's	W 79-57	17-6	Alumni Hall; Queens, NY
02/25/78*		at No. 11 Providence	W 60-51	18-6	Providence Civic Center; Providence, RI
02/27/78*		at Niagara	W 69-60	19-6	Niagara Falls Convention Center; Niagara Falls, NY
ECAC Metro tournament
03/02/78		vs. Iona; ECAC Metro Semifinal	W 83-80	20-6	Nassau Coliseum; Uniondale, NY
03/04/78		vs. Army; ECAC Metro Final	W 65-63	21-6	Nassau Coliseum; Uniondale, NY
NCAA tournament
03/12/78*		vs. No. 12 Louisville; NCAA Regional Quarterfinal	L 68-76	21-7	Mabee Center; Tulsa, OK
*Non-conference game. ^{#}Rankings from AP Poll. (#) Tournament seedings in parentheses.

== Team players drafted into the NBA ==
Round	Pick	Player	NBA club
1	12	George Johnson	Milwaukee Bucks
