= 1977–78 Notre Dame Fighting Irish men's basketball team =

American college basketball season

1977–78 Notre Dame Fighting Irish men's basketball

NCAA tournament, Final Four
- Conference: Independent

Ranking
- Coaches: No. 11
- AP: No. 6
- Record: 23–8
- Head coach: Digger Phelps
- Assistant coaches: Danny Nee; Scott Thompson (1st season)
- Home arena: Joyce Center

1977–78 NCAA Division I men's basketball independents standings
	Conf.				Overall
Team	W		L	PCT	W		L	PCT
No. 3 DePaul		–		–	27	–	3	.900
No. 18 Detroit		–		–	25	–	4	.862
Illinois State		–		–	24	–	4	.857
No. 8 Marquette		–		–	24	–	4	.857
Pan American		–		–	22	–	4	.846
VCU		–		–	24	–	5	.828
Fairfield		–		–	22	–	5	.815
North Texas State		–		–	22	–	6	.786
Syracuse		–		–	22	–	6	.786
Rhode Island		–		–	24	–	7	.774
Providence		–		–	24	–	8	.750
St. John's		–		–	21	–	7	.750
Utah State		–		–	21	–	7	.750
Georgetown		–		–	23	–	8	.742
No. 6 Notre Dame		–		–	23	–	8	.742
Holy Cross		–		–	20	–	7	.741
Northeast Louisiana		–		–	20	–	7	.741
UNC Wilmington		–		–	19	–	7	.731
St. Bonaventure		–		–	21	–	8	.724
UNLV		–		–	20	–	8	.714
Virginia Tech		–		–	19	–	8	.704
James Madison		–		–	18	–	8	.692
Maine		–		–	17	–	8	.680
Army		–		–	19	–	9	.679
Dayton		–		–	19	–	10	.655
St. Francis (NY)		–		–	16	–	9	.640
Iona		–		–	17	–	10	.630
William & Mary		–		–	16	–	10	.615
Air Force		–		–	15	–	10	.600
Loyola (IL)		–		–	16	–	11	.593
Mercer		–		–	16	–	11	.593
Oklahoma City		–		–	16	–	11	.593
Seton Hall		–		–	16	–	11	.593
Boston College		–		–	15	–	11	.577
Butler		–		–	15	–	11	.577
Saint Francis (PA)		–		–	15	–	11	.577
South Carolina		–		–	16	–	12	.571
Siena		–		–	13	–	10	.565
Navy		–		–	14	–	11	.560
Milwaukee		–		–	15	–	12	.556
Niagara		–		–	14	–	12	.538
Northeastern		–		–	14	–	12	.538
Southern Mississippi		–		–	13	–	12	.520
Portland State		–		–	14	–	13	.519
Stetson		–		–	14	–	13	.519
Oral Roberts		–		–	13	–	14	.481
Xavier		–		–	13	–	14	.481
Cleveland State		–		–	12	–	13	.480
Tennessee State		–		–	11	–	12	.478
Catholic		–		–	12	–	14	.462
Manhattan		–		–	12	–	14	.462
Georgia Southern		–		–	12	–	15	.444
Northwestern State		–		–	12	–	15	.444
Connecticut		–		–	11	–	15	.423
Old Dominion		–		–	11	–	15	.423
Vermont		–		–	11	–	15	.423
Boston University		–		–	10	–	15	.400
Hardin–Simmons		–		–	10	–	16	.385
Campbell		–		–	9	–	15	.375
Centenary (LA)		–		–	10	–	17	.370
Denver		–		–	10	–	17	.370
Colgate		–		–	9	–	17	.346
East Carolina		–		–	9	–	17	.346
Fordham		–		–	8	–	18	.308
Long Island		–		–	8	–	18	.308
Saint Peter's		–		–	8	–	18	.308
Baptist		–		–	8	–	19	.296
Samford		–		–	8	–	19	.296
Canisius		–		–	7	–	19	.269
Houston Baptist		–		–	7	–	19	.269
New Hampshire		–		–	7	–	19	.269
Wagner		–		–	7	–	19	.269
Evansville		–		–	1	–	3	.250
Fairleigh Dickinson		–		–	6	–	18	.250
Valparaiso		–		–	6	–	19	.240
Robert Morris		–		–	4	–	19	.174
Richmond		–		–	4	–	22	.154
Hawaii		–		–	1	–	26	.037
Rankings from AP Poll

The 1977–78 Notre Dame Fighting Irish men's basketball team represented the University of Notre Dame during the 1977–78 NCAA men's basketball season. The team was led by head coach Digger Phelps and played their home games at the Joyce Center.

Notre Dame entered the season with high expectations, as they opened with an AP preseason ranking of No. 4. Battle tested from a challenging schedule, the Irish earned a spot in the 1978 NCAA Tournament and played their way to the first Final Four appearance in school history.

== Roster ==
1977–78 Notre Dame Fighting Irish men's basketball team
Players
Coaches

Pos.	#	Name	Height	Weight	Year	Previous school	Hometown
F/C	45	Dave Batton	6 ft 9 in (2.06 m)	225 lb (102 kg)	Sr	Springfield	Springfield, PA
G	12	Rich Branning	6 ft 3 in (1.91 m)	160 lb (73 kg)	So	Marina	Huntington Beach, CA
G	10	Jeff Carpenter	6 ft 0 in (1.83 m)	165 lb (75 kg)	Sr	Fenwick	Oak Park, IL
G	24	Chris Fabian	6 ft 2 in (1.88 m)	195 lb (88 kg)	Jr	Haddonfield	Haddonfield, NJ
F/C	34	Bruce Flowers	6 ft 8 in (2.03 m)	210 lb (95 kg)	Jr	Berkley	Huntington Woods, MI
F	22	Randy Haefner	6 ft 6 in (1.98 m)	205 lb (93 kg)	Sr	McNicholas	Milford, OH
G/F	42	Bill Hanzlik	6 ft 7 in (2.01 m)	185 lb (84 kg)	So	Beloit	Beloit, WI
G	11	Tim Healy	6 ft 1 in (1.85 m)	170 lb (77 kg)	So	Cardinal Gibbons	Fort Lauderdale, FL
F	30	Tracy Jackson	6 ft 6 in (1.98 m)	210 lb (95 kg)	Fr	Paint Branch	Silver Spring, Maryland
C	52	Bill Laimbeer	6 ft 11 in (2.11 m)	235 lb (107 kg)	Jr	Palos Verdes; Owens CC	Palos Verdes, CA
C	55	Gilbert Salinas	6 ft 11 in (2.11 m)	215 lb (98 kg)	Fr		San Antonio, Texas
F	44	Kelly Tripucka	6 ft 6 in (1.98 m)	230 lb (104 kg)	Fr	Bloomfield	Essex Fells, New Jersey
G	25	Don Williams	6 ft 3 in (1.91 m)	180 lb (82 kg)	Sr	Mackin	Washington, D.C.
C	32	Orlando Woolridge	6 ft 9 in (2.06 m)	215 lb (98 kg)	Fr	Mansfield	Mansfield, Louisiana

Head coach

- Digger Phelps

Assistant coach(es)

- Danny Nee
- Scott Thompson

Legend

- (C) Team captain
- (S) Suspended
- (I) Ineligible
- (W) Walk-on
- Injured
- Current redshirt

== Schedule and results ==
Date time, TV	Rank^{#}	Opponent^{#}	Result	Record	Site city, state
Regular Season
Nov 26, 1977*	No. 4	Ole Miss	W 111–62	1–0	Joyce Center; Notre Dame, Indiana
Nov 30, 1977*	No. 3	Baylor	W 98–57	2–0	Joyce Center; Notre Dame, Indiana
Dec 3, 1977*	No. 3	Valparaiso	W 89–75	3–0	Joyce Center; Notre Dame, Indiana
Dec 5, 1977*	No. 3	Lafayette	W 76–42	4–0	Joyce Center; Notre Dame, Indiana
Dec 7, 1977*	No. 3	at Northwestern	W 88–48	5–0	Welsh-Ryan Arena; Evanston, Illinois
Dec 10, 1977*	No. 3	at No. 5 UCLA; Rivalry	W 69–66	6–0	Pauley Pavilion (12,829); Los Angeles, California
Dec 14, 1977*	No. 2	at Indiana	L 66–67	6–1	Assembly Hall; Bloomington, Indiana
Dec 23, 1977*	No. 5	Saint Joseph's (IN)	W 108–72	7–1	Joyce Center; Notre Dame, Indiana
Dec 31, 1977*	No. 4	vs. No. 1 Kentucky	L 68–73	7–2	Freedom Hall; Louisville, Kentucky
Jan 10, 1978*	No. 5	at San Francisco	L 70–79	7–3	Oakland–Alameda County Coliseum Arena; Oakland, California
Jan 14, 1978*	No. 5	at St. Bonaventure	W 79–78	8–3	Rochester Community War Memorial; Rochester, New York
Jan 17, 1978*	No. 7	Manhattan	W 81–64	9–3	Joyce Center; Notre Dame, Indiana
Jan 19, 1978*	No. 7	Villanova	W 70–69	10–3	Joyce Center; Notre Dame, Indiana
Jan 22, 1978*	No. 7	No. 3 UCLA; Rivalry	W 75–73	11–3	Joyce Center (11,345); Notre Dame, Indiana
Jan 23, 1978*	No. 7	Dartmouth	W 78–64	12–3	Joyce Center; Notre Dame, Indiana
Jan 25, 1978*	No. 5	West Virginia	W 103–82	13–3	Joyce Center; Notre Dame, Indiana
Jan 29, 1978*	No. 5	Maryland	W 69–54	14–3	Joyce Center; Notre Dame, Indiana
Feb 1, 1978*	No. 4	at La Salle	W 95–90	15–3	The Palestra; Philadelphia, Pennsylvania
Feb 4, 1978*	No. 4	Davidson	W 100–76	16–3	Joyce Center; Notre Dame, Indiana
Feb 12, 1978*	No. 4	No. 11 DePaul	L 68–69 ^{OT}	16–4	Joyce Center; Notre Dame, Indiana
Feb 16, 1978*	No. 7	at Fordham	W 95–76	17–4	Madison Square Garden; New York, New York
Feb 18, 1978*	No. 7	at South Carolina	L 60–65	17–5	Carolina Coliseum; Columbia, South Carolina
Feb 21, 1978*	No. 9	North Carolina State	W 70–59	18–5	Joyce Center; Notre Dame, Indiana
Feb 26, 1978*	No. 9	No. 1 Marquette	W 65–59	19–5	Joyce Center (11,345); Notre Dame, Indiana
Mar 4, 1978*	No. 7	at Dayton	L 59–66	19–6	University of Dayton Arena; Dayton, Ohio
Mar 6, 1978*	No. 10	Loyola-Chicago	W 83–68	20–6	Joyce Center; Notre Dame, Indiana
NCAA Tournament
Mar 12, 1978*	No. 6	vs. Houston; First round	W 100–77	21–6	Mabee Center; Tulsa, Oklahoma
Mar 17, 1978*	No. 6	vs. No. 14 Utah; Midwest Regional Final – Sweet Sixteen	W 69–56	22–6	Allen Fieldhouse; Lawrence, Kansas
Mar 19, 1978*	No. 6	vs. No. 3 DePaul; Midwest Regional Final – Elite Eight	W 84–64	23–6	Allen Fieldhouse; Lawrence, Kansas
Mar 25, 1978*	No. 6	vs. No. 7 Duke; National semifinal – Final Four	L 86–90	23–7	Checkerdome; St. Louis, Missouri
Mar 27, 1978*	No. 6	vs. No. 5 Arkansas; National consolation – Third-place game	L 69–71	23–8	Checkerdome; St. Louis, Missouri
*Non-conference game. ^{#}Rankings from AP poll. (#) Tournament seedings in parentheses. MW=Midwest. All times are in Eastern Time.
