= 1977–78 Detroit Titans men's basketball team =

American college basketball season

1977–78 Detroit Titans men's basketball
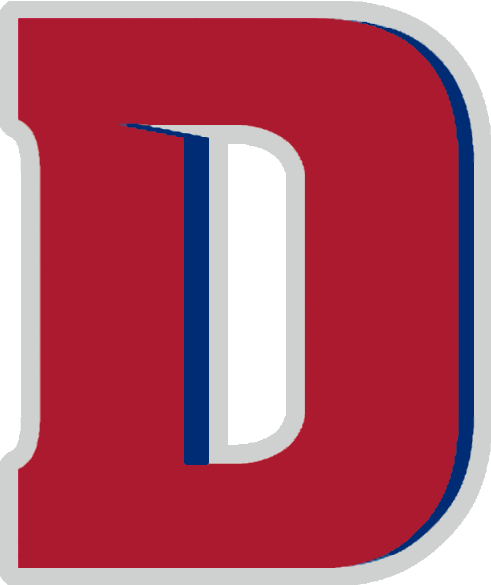

NIT, Second Round
- Conference: Independent

Ranking
- AP: No. 18
- Record: 25–4
- Head coach: Smokey Gaines (1st season)
- Assistant coach: Willie McCarter
- Home arena: Calihan Hall

1977–78 NCAA Division I men's basketball independents standings
	Conf.				Overall
Team	W		L	PCT	W		L	PCT
No. 3 DePaul		–		–	27	–	3	.900
No. 18 Detroit		–		–	25	–	4	.862
Illinois State		–		–	24	–	4	.857
No. 8 Marquette		–		–	24	–	4	.857
Pan American		–		–	22	–	4	.846
VCU		–		–	24	–	5	.828
Fairfield		–		–	22	–	5	.815
North Texas State		–		–	22	–	6	.786
Syracuse		–		–	22	–	6	.786
Rhode Island		–		–	24	–	7	.774
Providence		–		–	24	–	8	.750
St. John's		–		–	21	–	7	.750
Utah State		–		–	21	–	7	.750
Georgetown		–		–	23	–	8	.742
No. 6 Notre Dame		–		–	23	–	8	.742
Holy Cross		–		–	20	–	7	.741
Northeast Louisiana		–		–	20	–	7	.741
UNC Wilmington		–		–	19	–	7	.731
St. Bonaventure		–		–	21	–	8	.724
UNLV		–		–	20	–	8	.714
Virginia Tech		–		–	19	–	8	.704
James Madison		–		–	18	–	8	.692
Maine		–		–	17	–	8	.680
Army		–		–	19	–	9	.679
Dayton		–		–	19	–	10	.655
St. Francis (NY)		–		–	16	–	9	.640
Iona		–		–	17	–	10	.630
William & Mary		–		–	16	–	10	.615
Air Force		–		–	15	–	10	.600
Loyola (IL)		–		–	16	–	11	.593
Mercer		–		–	16	–	11	.593
Oklahoma City		–		–	16	–	11	.593
Seton Hall		–		–	16	–	11	.593
Boston College		–		–	15	–	11	.577
Butler		–		–	15	–	11	.577
Saint Francis (PA)		–		–	15	–	11	.577
South Carolina		–		–	16	–	12	.571
Siena		–		–	13	–	10	.565
Navy		–		–	14	–	11	.560
Milwaukee		–		–	15	–	12	.556
Niagara		–		–	14	–	12	.538
Northeastern		–		–	14	–	12	.538
Southern Mississippi		–		–	13	–	12	.520
Portland State		–		–	14	–	13	.519
Stetson		–		–	14	–	13	.519
Oral Roberts		–		–	13	–	14	.481
Xavier		–		–	13	–	14	.481
Cleveland State		–		–	12	–	13	.480
Tennessee State		–		–	11	–	12	.478
Catholic		–		–	12	–	14	.462
Manhattan		–		–	12	–	14	.462
Georgia Southern		–		–	12	–	15	.444
Northwestern State		–		–	12	–	15	.444
Connecticut		–		–	11	–	15	.423
Old Dominion		–		–	11	–	15	.423
Vermont		–		–	11	–	15	.423
Boston University		–		–	10	–	15	.400
Hardin–Simmons		–		–	10	–	16	.385
Campbell		–		–	9	–	15	.375
Centenary (LA)		–		–	10	–	17	.370
Denver		–		–	10	–	17	.370
Colgate		–		–	9	–	17	.346
East Carolina		–		–	9	–	17	.346
Fordham		–		–	8	–	18	.308
Long Island		–		–	8	–	18	.308
Saint Peter's		–		–	8	–	18	.308
Baptist		–		–	8	–	19	.296
Samford		–		–	8	–	19	.296
Canisius		–		–	7	–	19	.269
Houston Baptist		–		–	7	–	19	.269
New Hampshire		–		–	7	–	19	.269
Wagner		–		–	7	–	19	.269
Evansville		–		–	1	–	3	.250
Fairleigh Dickinson		–		–	6	–	18	.250
Valparaiso		–		–	6	–	19	.240
Robert Morris		–		–	4	–	19	.174
Richmond		–		–	4	–	22	.154
Hawaii		–		–	1	–	26	.037
Rankings from AP Poll

The 1977–78 Detroit Titans men's basketball team represented the University of Detroit in the 1977–78 NCAA Division I men's basketball season. The team played at Calihan Hall in Detroit.

The Titans were led by head coach Smokey Gaines, a former assistant coach who moved into the head coaching role for the season when former coach Dick Vitale became the school's Athletic Director. He had quick success at UD finishing 25–4 in his first season, inheriting a stocked roster with guard John Long, forward Terry Tyler and guard Terry Duerod, all of whom would eventually play in the NBA.

Detroit, coming off a Sweet Sixteen appearance in the 1977 NCAA Tournament, rolled for much of the season, and with an independent status, entered the final game of the season 24–2 with a home game against rival Marquette, ranked #3. With previous losses to the only ranked teams on the schedule, the Earvin "Magic" Johnson led Michigan State Spartans, who would finish #4 in the final rankings, and on the road at #20 Georgetown, the game represented an opportunity to secure an NCAA bid. In front of the largest crowd in Calihan Hall history, the Titans came up short as Butch Lee of Marquette led a balanced attack in the 80-77 Warriors victory.

Denied an NCAA bid, the Titans would finish the regular season 24-3 and received a bid to the 1978 National Invitation Tournament. Detroit defeated Virginia Commonwealth 94–86 at home in the opening round, with a double-double of 19 points and 11 rebounds from Terry Tyler. On the road, the University of Detroit would lose to the NC State Wolfpack 84–77 as Kendal Pinder scored 18 points with 21 rebounds, as the height advantaged Wolfpack dominated the boards 64–33.

On the season, Tyler averaged a double-double of 16.4 ppg and 12.6 rpg, Long paced the team's scoring with 21.4 ppg, and Duerod contributed 17.1 ppg. After the season, Vitale would be hired to coach the Detroit Pistons of the NBA, and drafted Long and Tyler in the 1978 NBA draft.

Vitale was inducted in the University of Detroit Athletics Hall of Fame in 1993 alongside Terry Duerod. Terry Tyler and John Long were honored together in 2001.

== Roster ==
1977–78 Detroit Titans men's basketball team
Players
Coaches

Pos.	#	Name	Height	Weight	Year	Hometown
F		John Long	6 ft 5 in (1.96 m)	—	Sr
G		Terry Duerod	6 ft 1 in (1.85 m)	—	Jr	Royal Oak, Michigan
F		Terry Tyler	6 ft 7 in (2.01 m)	—	Sr
G		Kevin Smith	6 ft 2 in (1.88 m)	—	Fr
G		Wilbert McCormick	6 ft 1 in (1.85 m)	—	So
G		Turono Anderson	6 ft 3 in (1.91 m)	—	Sr
F		Kevin Kaseta	6 ft 9 in (2.06 m)	—	Sr
G		Dave Niles	6 ft 5 in (1.96 m)	—	So
F		Jeff Whitlow	6 ft 6 in (1.98 m)	—	Jr
F		Arthur Bright	6 ft 5 in (1.96 m)	—	Fr
F		Billy Harris	6 ft 8 in (2.03 m)	—	So
F		Eric Argady	6 ft 9 in (2.06 m)	—	So
G		Rich McDermott	6 ft 2 in (1.88 m)	—	Jr
F		Walter Smith	6 ft 7 in (2.01 m)	—	Sr

Head coach

- Smokey Gaines (LeMoyne–Owen)

Assistant coach(es)

Legend

- (C) Team captain
- (S) Suspended
- (I) Ineligible
- (W) Walk-on
- Injured
- Current redshirt

Roster

== Schedule and results ==
Date time, TV	Rank^{#}	Opponent^{#}	Result	Record	Site city, state
Regular Season
Dec 1, 1977*	No. 19	at Toledo	W 76–64	1–0	Centennial Hall; Toledo, Ohio
Dec 4, 1977*		Adrian	W 112–69	2–0	Calihan Hall; Detroit, Michigan
Dec 8, 1977*	No. 17	Saint Louis	W 69–61	3–0	Calihan Hall; Detroit, Michigan
Dec, 1977*		Northern Michigan	W 111–66	4–0	Calihan Hall; Detroit, Michigan
Dec 12, 1977*	No. 16	at St. Bonaventure	W 94–92	5–0	Reilly Center; St. Bonaventure, New York
Dec 17, 1977*	No. 16	Ball State	W 103–70	6–0	Calihan Hall; Detroit, Michigan
Dec 21, 1977*	No. 15	Michigan State	L 74–103	6–1	Calihan Hall; Detroit, Michigan
Dec 26, 1977*	No. 20	Harvard; Motor City Classic	W 77–69	7–1	Calihan Hall; Detroit, Michigan
Dec 27, 1977*	No. 20	Eastern Michigan; Motor City Classic	W 109–71	8–1	Calihan Hall; Detroit, Michigan
Dec 30, 1977*	No. 20	at Marshall	W 89–84	9–1	Veterans Memorial Fieldhouse; Huntington, West Virginia
*		Buffalo	W 122–81	10–1	Calihan Hall (7,195); Detroit, Michigan
*		Oakland	W 99–58	11–1	Calihan Hall; Detroit, Michigan
Jan 11, 1978*		at Iona	W 84–79	12–1	John A. Mulcahy Campus Events Center; New Rochelle, New York
Jan 14, 1978*		Dayton	W 87–73	13–1	Calihan Hall; Detroit, Michigan
Jan 18, 1978*		at Bowling Green	W 84–79	14–1	Anderson Arena; Bowling Green, Ohio
Jan 21, 1978*		Saint Peter's	W 87–77	15–1	Calihan Hall; Detroit, Michigan
Jan 28, 1978*		Duquesne	W 98–80	16–1	Calihan Hall; Detroit, Michigan
, 1978*		Wayne State	W 84–51	17–1	Calihan Hall; Detroit, Michigan
Feb 4, 1978*		Xavier	W 80–74	18–1	Calihan Hall; Detroit, Michigan
Feb 11, 1978*	No. 17	at Georgetown	L 82–83	18–2	McDonough Gymnasium (4,500); Washington, DC
Feb 15, 1978*	No. 19	at Western Michigan	W 113–91	19–2	Read Fieldhouse; Kalamazoo, Michigan
Feb, 1978*		CCNY	W 132–91	20–2	Calihan Hall; Detroit, Michigan
Feb 18, 1978*	No. 19	Canisius	W 124–89	21–2	Calihan Hall; Detroit, Michigan
Feb 22, 1978*	No. 16	Saint Francis (PA)	W 121–89	22–2	Calihan Hall; Detroit, Michigan
Feb 25, 1978*	No. 16	at Xavier	W 82–77	23–2	Schmidt Fieldhouse; Cincinnati, Ohio
Feb 27, 1978*	No. 16	Loyola (IL)	W 89–69	24–2	Calihan Hall; Detroit, Michigan
Mar 4, 1978*	No. 16	No. 3 Marquette	L 77–80	24–3	Calihan Hall (11,065); Detroit, Michigan
NIT
Mar 9, 1978*	No. 19	VCU; First round	W 94–86	25–3	Calihan Hall; Detroit, Michigan
Mar 14, 1978*	No. 18	at NC State; Quarterfinals	L 77–84	25–4	Reynolds Coliseum; Raleigh, North Carolina
*Non-conference game. ^{#}Rankings from AP Poll. (#) Tournament seedings in parentheses. All times are in Eastern Time.
