= 1977–78 Connecticut Huskies men's basketball team =

American college basketball season

1977–78 Connecticut Huskies men's basketball
- Conference: Independent
- Record: 11–15
- Head coach: Dom Perno (1st season)
- Assistant coaches: Jim O’Brien; Arthur A. Perry
- Home arena: Hugh S. Greer Field House; Hartford Civic Center

1977–78 NCAA Division I men's basketball independents standings
	Conf.				Overall
Team	W		L	PCT	W		L	PCT
No. 3 DePaul		–		–	27	–	3	.900
No. 18 Detroit		–		–	25	–	4	.862
Illinois State		–		–	24	–	4	.857
No. 8 Marquette		–		–	24	–	4	.857
Pan American		–		–	22	–	4	.846
VCU		–		–	24	–	5	.828
Fairfield		–		–	22	–	5	.815
North Texas State		–		–	22	–	6	.786
Syracuse		–		–	22	–	6	.786
Rhode Island		–		–	24	–	7	.774
Providence		–		–	24	–	8	.750
St. John's		–		–	21	–	7	.750
Utah State		–		–	21	–	7	.750
Georgetown		–		–	23	–	8	.742
No. 6 Notre Dame		–		–	23	–	8	.742
Holy Cross		–		–	20	–	7	.741
Northeast Louisiana		–		–	20	–	7	.741
UNC Wilmington		–		–	19	–	7	.731
St. Bonaventure		–		–	21	–	8	.724
UNLV		–		–	20	–	8	.714
Virginia Tech		–		–	19	–	8	.704
James Madison		–		–	18	–	8	.692
Maine		–		–	17	–	8	.680
Army		–		–	19	–	9	.679
Dayton		–		–	19	–	10	.655
St. Francis (NY)		–		–	16	–	9	.640
Iona		–		–	17	–	10	.630
William & Mary		–		–	16	–	10	.615
Air Force		–		–	15	–	10	.600
Loyola (IL)		–		–	16	–	11	.593
Mercer		–		–	16	–	11	.593
Oklahoma City		–		–	16	–	11	.593
Seton Hall		–		–	16	–	11	.593
Boston College		–		–	15	–	11	.577
Butler		–		–	15	–	11	.577
Saint Francis (PA)		–		–	15	–	11	.577
South Carolina		–		–	16	–	12	.571
Siena		–		–	13	–	10	.565
Navy		–		–	14	–	11	.560
Milwaukee		–		–	15	–	12	.556
Niagara		–		–	14	–	12	.538
Northeastern		–		–	14	–	12	.538
Southern Mississippi		–		–	13	–	12	.520
Portland State		–		–	14	–	13	.519
Stetson		–		–	14	–	13	.519
Oral Roberts		–		–	13	–	14	.481
Xavier		–		–	13	–	14	.481
Cleveland State		–		–	12	–	13	.480
Tennessee State		–		–	11	–	12	.478
Catholic		–		–	12	–	14	.462
Manhattan		–		–	12	–	14	.462
Georgia Southern		–		–	12	–	15	.444
Northwestern State		–		–	12	–	15	.444
Connecticut		–		–	11	–	15	.423
Old Dominion		–		–	11	–	15	.423
Vermont		–		–	11	–	15	.423
Boston University		–		–	10	–	15	.400
Hardin–Simmons		–		–	10	–	16	.385
Campbell		–		–	9	–	15	.375
Centenary (LA)		–		–	10	–	17	.370
Denver		–		–	10	–	17	.370
Colgate		–		–	9	–	17	.346
East Carolina		–		–	9	–	17	.346
Fordham		–		–	8	–	18	.308
Long Island		–		–	8	–	18	.308
Saint Peter's		–		–	8	–	18	.308
Baptist		–		–	8	–	19	.296
Samford		–		–	8	–	19	.296
Canisius		–		–	7	–	19	.269
Houston Baptist		–		–	7	–	19	.269
New Hampshire		–		–	7	–	19	.269
Wagner		–		–	7	–	19	.269
Evansville		–		–	1	–	3	.250
Fairleigh Dickinson		–		–	6	–	18	.250
Valparaiso		–		–	6	–	19	.240
Robert Morris		–		–	4	–	19	.174
Richmond		–		–	4	–	22	.154
Hawaii		–		–	1	–	26	.037
Rankings from AP Poll

The 1977–78 Connecticut Huskies men's basketball team represented the University of Connecticut in the 1977–78 collegiate men's basketball season. The Huskies completed the season with an 11–15 overall record. The Huskies were an NCAA Division I Independent school for men's basketball this year. The Huskies played their home games at Hugh S. Greer Field House in Storrs, Connecticut and the Hartford Civic Center in Hartford, Connecticut, and were led by first-year head coach Dom Perno.

In the early morning hours of January 18, 1978 the Hartford Civic Center roof collapsed under the weight of snow just hours after the UConn game vs UMass. This forced UConn to play the remainder of their season solely in Storrs.

== Schedule ==
Date time, TV	Rank^{#}	Opponent^{#}	Result	Record	Site (attendance) city, state
Regular season
11/26/1977*		Fordham	W 73–62	1–0	Hartford Civic Center; Hartford, CT
11/30/1977*		at Syracuse; Rivalry	L 61–101	1–1	Manley Field House; Syracuse, NY
12/3/1977*		Yale	W 73–57	2–1	Hugh S. Greer Field House; Storrs, CT
12/6/1977*		New Hampshire	W 82–68	3–1	Hugh S. Greer Field House; Storrs, CT
12/10/1977*		at Boston University	L 61–66	3–2	Case Gym; Boston, MA
12/14/1977*		at Massachusetts	L 64–74	3–3	Curry Hicks Cage; Amherst, MA
12/28/1977*		Niagara; UConn Classic	L 72–96	3–4	Hartford Civic Center; Hartford, CT
12/29/1977*		Manhattan; UConn Classic	W 75–68	4–4	Hartford Civic Center; Hartford, CT
1/3/1978*		Colgate	W 76–57	5–4	Hugh S. Greer Field House; Storrs, CT
1/6/1978*		St. Francis (NY)	L 81–84	5–5	Hugh S. Greer Field House; Storrs, CT
1/7/1978*		at New Hampshire	W 60–50	6–5	Lundholm Gym; Durham, NH
1/10/1978*		at Rhode Island	L 68–78	6–6	Keaney Gymnasium; Kingston, RI
1/14/1978*		at Harvard	W 73–72	7–6	Malkin Athletic Center; Cambridge, MA
1/17/1978*		Massachusetts	W 56–49	8–6	Hartford Civic Center; Hartford, CT
1/21/1978*		Providence	L 47–57	8–7	New Haven Coliseum; New Haven, CT
1/25/1978*		Boston University	W 80–63	9–7	Hugh S. Greer Field House; Storrs, CT
1/27/1978*		vs. Holy Cross; Colonial Classic	L 63–78	9–8	Boston Garden; Boston, MA
1/28/1978*		vs. Boston College; Colonial Classic	L 72–102	9–9	Boston Garden; Boston, MA
2/4/1978*		at Rutgers	L 70–78	9–10	Louis Brown Athletic Center; Piscataway, NJ
2/9/1978*		at St. Peter's	L 71–95	9–11	Yanitelli Center; Jersey City, NJ
2/11/1978*		Rhode Island	L 61–70	9–12	Hugh S. Greer Field House; Storrs, CT
2/15/1978*		at Maine	L 73–79	9–13	Memorial Gymnasium; Orono, ME
2/18/1978*		Vermont	W 59–48	10–13	Hugh S. Greer Field House; Storrs, CT
2/22/1978*		Boston College	L 74–76	10–14	Hugh S. Greer Field House; Storrs, CT
2/25/1978*		Manhattan	W 57–54	11–14	Hugh S. Greer Field House; Storrs, CT
2/28/1978*		at Fairfield	L 57–63	11–15	Alumni Hall; Fairfield, CT
*Non-conference game. ^{#}Rankings from AP Poll. (#) Tournament seedings in parentheses. All times are in Eastern Time.

Schedule Source:
