= 1977–78 Marquette Warriors men's basketball team =

American college basketball season

1977–78 Marquette Warriors men's basketball

NCAA Tournament, First Round, L 81–84 vs. Miami (OH)
- Conference: Independent

Ranking
- Coaches: No. 3
- AP: No. 8
- Record: 24–4
- Head coach: Hank Raymonds (1st season)
- Home arena: MECCA Arena

1977–78 NCAA Division I men's basketball independents standings
| | Conf. | | | | Overall |
| Team | W | | L | PCT | W | | L | PCT |
|---|---|---|---|---|---|---|---|---|
| No. 3 DePaul | | – | | – | 27 | – | 3 | .900 |
| No. 18 Detroit | | – | | – | 25 | – | 4 | .862 |
| Illinois State | | – | | – | 24 | – | 4 | .857 |
| No. 8 Marquette | | – | | – | 24 | – | 4 | .857 |
| Pan American | | – | | – | 22 | – | 4 | .846 |
| VCU | | – | | – | 24 | – | 5 | .828 |
| Fairfield | | – | | – | 22 | – | 5 | .815 |
| North Texas State | | – | | – | 22 | – | 6 | .786 |
| Syracuse | | – | | – | 22 | – | 6 | .786 |
| Rhode Island | | – | | – | 24 | – | 7 | .774 |
| Providence | | – | | – | 24 | – | 8 | .750 |
| St. John's | | – | | – | 21 | – | 7 | .750 |
| Utah State | | – | | – | 21 | – | 7 | .750 |
| Georgetown | | – | | – | 23 | – | 8 | .742 |
| No. 6 Notre Dame | | – | | – | 23 | – | 8 | .742 |
| Holy Cross | | – | | – | 20 | – | 7 | .741 |
| Northeast Louisiana | | – | | – | 20 | – | 7 | .741 |
| UNC Wilmington | | – | | – | 19 | – | 7 | .731 |
| St. Bonaventure | | – | | – | 21 | – | 8 | .724 |
| UNLV | | – | | – | 20 | – | 8 | .714 |
| Virginia Tech | | – | | – | 19 | – | 8 | .704 |
| James Madison | | – | | – | 18 | – | 8 | .692 |
| Maine | | – | | – | 17 | – | 8 | .680 |
| Army | | – | | – | 19 | – | 9 | .679 |
| Dayton | | – | | – | 19 | – | 10 | .655 |
| St. Francis (NY) | | – | | – | 16 | – | 9 | .640 |
| Iona | | – | | – | 17 | – | 10 | .630 |
| William & Mary | | – | | – | 16 | – | 10 | .615 |
| Air Force | | – | | – | 15 | – | 10 | .600 |
| Loyola (IL) | | – | | – | 16 | – | 11 | .593 |
| Mercer | | – | | – | 16 | – | 11 | .593 |
| Oklahoma City | | – | | – | 16 | – | 11 | .593 |
| Seton Hall | | – | | – | 16 | – | 11 | .593 |
| Boston College | | – | | – | 15 | – | 11 | .577 |
| Butler | | – | | – | 15 | – | 11 | .577 |
| Saint Francis (PA) | | – | | – | 15 | – | 11 | .577 |
| South Carolina | | – | | – | 16 | – | 12 | .571 |
| Siena | | – | | – | 13 | – | 10 | .565 |
| Navy | | – | | – | 14 | – | 11 | .560 |
| Milwaukee | | – | | – | 15 | – | 12 | .556 |
| Niagara | | – | | – | 14 | – | 12 | .538 |
| Northeastern | | – | | – | 14 | – | 12 | .538 |
| Southern Mississippi | | – | | – | 13 | – | 12 | .520 |
| Portland State | | – | | – | 14 | – | 13 | .519 |
| Stetson | | – | | – | 14 | – | 13 | .519 |
| Oral Roberts | | – | | – | 13 | – | 14 | .481 |
| Xavier | | – | | – | 13 | – | 14 | .481 |
| Cleveland State | | – | | – | 12 | – | 13 | .480 |
| Tennessee State | | – | | – | 11 | – | 12 | .478 |
| Catholic | | – | | – | 12 | – | 14 | .462 |
| Manhattan | | – | | – | 12 | – | 14 | .462 |
| Georgia Southern | | – | | – | 12 | – | 15 | .444 |
| Northwestern State | | – | | – | 12 | – | 15 | .444 |
| Connecticut | | – | | – | 11 | – | 15 | .423 |
| Old Dominion | | – | | – | 11 | – | 15 | .423 |
| Vermont | | – | | – | 11 | – | 15 | .423 |
| Boston University | | – | | – | 10 | – | 15 | .400 |
| Hardin–Simmons | | – | | – | 10 | – | 16 | .385 |
| Campbell | | – | | – | 9 | – | 15 | .375 |
| Centenary (LA) | | – | | – | 10 | – | 17 | .370 |
| Denver | | – | | – | 10 | – | 17 | .370 |
| Colgate | | – | | – | 9 | – | 17 | .346 |
| East Carolina | | – | | – | 9 | – | 17 | .346 |
| Fordham | | – | | – | 8 | – | 18 | .308 |
| Long Island | | – | | – | 8 | – | 18 | .308 |
| Saint Peter's | | – | | – | 8 | – | 18 | .308 |
| Baptist | | – | | – | 8 | – | 19 | .296 |
| Samford | | – | | – | 8 | – | 19 | .296 |
| Canisius | | – | | – | 7 | – | 19 | .269 |
| Houston Baptist | | – | | – | 7 | – | 19 | .269 |
| New Hampshire | | – | | – | 7 | – | 19 | .269 |
| Wagner | | – | | – | 7 | – | 19 | .269 |
| Evansville | | – | | – | 1 | – | 3 | .250 |
| Fairleigh Dickinson | | – | | – | 6 | – | 18 | .250 |
| Valparaiso | | – | | – | 6 | – | 19 | .240 |
| Robert Morris | | – | | – | 4 | – | 19 | .174 |
| Richmond | | – | | – | 4 | – | 22 | .154 |
| Hawaii | | – | | – | 1 | – | 26 | .037 |
Rankings from AP Poll

The 1977–78 Marquette Warriors men's basketball team represented the Marquette University in the 1977–78 season. The Warriors finished the regular season with a record of 24–4. The Warriors would receive an at-large bid into the NCAA Tournament where they would fall in the first round to Miami (OH).

== Roster ==
1977–78 Marquette Warriors men's basketball team
Players
Coaches

| Pos. | # | Name | Height | Weight | Year | Hometown |
|---|---|---|---|---|---|---|
| C | | Odell Ball | 6 ft 9 in (2.06 m) | — | Jr |
| G | 23 | Jim Boylan | 6 ft 2 in (1.88 m) | 190 lb (86 kg) | Sr | Jersey City, New Jersey |
| F | 43 | Robert Byrd | 6 ft 6 in (1.98 m) | 185 lb (84 kg) | So | Chicago, Illinois |
| G | | Tony Davis | 6 ft 2 in (1.88 m) | — | Fr |
| F | 40 | Jim Dudley | 6 ft 6 in (1.98 m) | 190 lb (86 kg) | Jr | South Milwaukee, Wisconsin |
| G | | Larry Hatchett | 6 ft 2 in (1.88 m) | — | Fr |
| G | 15 | Butch Lee | 6 ft 1 in (1.85 m) | 185 lb (84 kg) | Sr | The Bronx, New York |
| F | | Oliver Lee | 6 ft 7 in (2.01 m) | — | Fr |
| F | 21 | Ulice Payne | 6 ft 6 in (1.98 m) | 185 lb (84 kg) | Sr | Donora, Pennsylvania |
| G | 55 | Gary Rosenberger | 6 ft 0 in (1.83 m) | 155 lb (70 kg) | Sr | Milwaukee, Wisconsin |
| F | 33 | Bernard Toone | 6 ft 9 in (2.06 m) | 210 lb (95 kg) | Jr | Yonkers, New York |
| C | 54 | Jerome Whitehead | 6 ft 10 in (2.08 m) | 220 lb (100 kg) | Sr | Waukegan, Illinois |

Head coach

- Hank Raymonds

Assistant coach(es)

- Rick Majerus

Legend

- (C) Team captain
- (S) Suspended
- (I) Ineligible
- (W) Walk-on
- Injured
- Current redshirt

== Schedule ==
| Date time, TV | Rank^{#} | Opponent^{#} | Result | Record | Site city, state |
Regular season
| November 30 | | St. Thomas (MN) | W 87–60 | 1–0 | MECCA Arena (10,938); Milwaukee, WI |
| December 3 | | Western Michigan | W 59–47 | 2–0 | MECCA Arena (10,938); Milwaukee, WI |
| December 6 | | at Minnesota | W 61–44 | 3–0 | Williams Arena (14,709); Minneapolis, MN |
| December 10 | | Florida | W 81–67 | 4–0 | MECCA Arena (10,938); Milwaukee, WI |
| December 17 | | Bowling Green State | W 86–54 | 5–0 | MECCA Arena (10,938); Milwaukee, WI |
| December 22 | No. 2 | at Louisville | L 60–61 | 5–1 | Freedom Hall (16,433); Louisville, Kentucky |
| December 26 | | Eastern Kentucky | W 90–73 | 6–1 | MECCA Arena (10,938); Milwaukee, WI |
| December 27 | No. 5 | Texas; Milwaukee Classic | W 65–56 | 7–1 | MECCA Arena (10,938); Milwaukee, WI |
| January 2 | | at Wichita State | W 67–56 | 8–1 | Levitt Arena (9,802); Wichita, Kansas |
| January 6 | | Centenary | W 72–56 | 9–1 | MECCA Arena (10,938); Milwaukee, WI |
| January 9 | | at Missouri | W 70–52 | 10–1 | Hearnes Center (9,415); Columbia, Missouri |
| January 13 | | Saint Louis | W 56–54 | 11–1 | MECCA Arena (10,938); Milwaukee, WI |
| January 15 | | UNLV | W 97–81 | 12–1 | MECCA Arena (10,938); Milwaukee, WI |
| January 18 | | DePaul | W 80–74 | 13–1 | MECCA Arena (10,938); Milwaukee, WI |
| January 21 | No. 2 | Washington | W 71–63 | 14–1 | MECCA Arena (10,938); Milwaukee, WI |
| January 24 | | Xavier | W 78–62 | 15–1 | MECCA Arena (10,938); Milwaukee, WI |
| January 28 | | at Loyola (IL) | L 64–68 | 15–2 | Alumni Gym (7,140); Chicago, Illinois |
| February 2 | | at Penn State | W 73–60 | 16–2 | Rec Hall (8,475); University Park, Pennsylvania |
| February 2 | | at South Carolina | W 69–66 ^{2OT} | 17–2 | Carolina Coliseum (11,876); Columbia, SC |
| February 7 | No. 3 | Creighton | W 82–57 | 18–2 | MECCA Arena (10,938); Milwaukee, WI |
| February 11 | | Air Force | W 76–59 | 19–2 | MECCA Arena (10,938); Milwaukee, WI |
| February 14 | No. 1 | Wisconsin | W 75–64 | 20–2 | MECCA Arena (10,938); Milwaukee, WI |
| February 18 | | Cincinnati | W 57–45 | 21–2 | MECCA Arena (10,938); Milwaukee, WI |
| February 20 | | at Xavier | W 75–53 | 22–2 | Schmidt Field House (7,482); Cincinnati, OH |
| February 26 | | at Notre Dame | L 59–65 | 22–3 | Joyce Center (11,345); South Bend, Indiana |
| March 1 | | Butler | W 90–79 | 23–3 | MECCA Arena (10,938); Milwaukee, WI |
| March 4 | No. 3 | at No. 16 Detroit | W 80–77 | 24–3 | Calihan Hall (11,065); Detroit, Michigan |
NCAA tournament
| March 11 | (ME 1L) No. 3 | vs. (ME 3Q) Miami (OH); First Round | L 81–84 ^{OT} | 24–4 | Market Square Arena (16,519); Indianapolis, Indiana |
*Non-conference game. ^{#}Rankings from AP poll. (#) Tournament seedings in parentheses. ME=Mideast. All times are in Eastern Time.
