= 1977–78 Rhode Island Rams men's basketball team =

American college basketball season

1977–78 Rhode Island Rams men's basketball

NCAA tournament
- Conference: Independent
- Record: 24–7
- Head coach: Jack Kraft
- Home arena: Keaney Gymnasium

1977–78 NCAA Division I men's basketball independents standings
	Conf.				Overall
Team	W		L	PCT	W		L	PCT
No. 3 DePaul		–		–	27	–	3	.900
No. 18 Detroit		–		–	25	–	4	.862
Illinois State		–		–	24	–	4	.857
No. 8 Marquette		–		–	24	–	4	.857
Pan American		–		–	22	–	4	.846
VCU		–		–	24	–	5	.828
Fairfield		–		–	22	–	5	.815
North Texas State		–		–	22	–	6	.786
Syracuse		–		–	22	–	6	.786
Rhode Island		–		–	24	–	7	.774
Providence		–		–	24	–	8	.750
St. John's		–		–	21	–	7	.750
Utah State		–		–	21	–	7	.750
Georgetown		–		–	23	–	8	.742
No. 6 Notre Dame		–		–	23	–	8	.742
Holy Cross		–		–	20	–	7	.741
Northeast Louisiana		–		–	20	–	7	.741
UNC Wilmington		–		–	19	–	7	.731
St. Bonaventure		–		–	21	–	8	.724
UNLV		–		–	20	–	8	.714
Virginia Tech		–		–	19	–	8	.704
James Madison		–		–	18	–	8	.692
Maine		–		–	17	–	8	.680
Army		–		–	19	–	9	.679
Dayton		–		–	19	–	10	.655
St. Francis (NY)		–		–	16	–	9	.640
Iona		–		–	17	–	10	.630
William & Mary		–		–	16	–	10	.615
Air Force		–		–	15	–	10	.600
Loyola (IL)		–		–	16	–	11	.593
Mercer		–		–	16	–	11	.593
Oklahoma City		–		–	16	–	11	.593
Seton Hall		–		–	16	–	11	.593
Boston College		–		–	15	–	11	.577
Butler		–		–	15	–	11	.577
Saint Francis (PA)		–		–	15	–	11	.577
South Carolina		–		–	16	–	12	.571
Siena		–		–	13	–	10	.565
Navy		–		–	14	–	11	.560
Milwaukee		–		–	15	–	12	.556
Niagara		–		–	14	–	12	.538
Northeastern		–		–	14	–	12	.538
Southern Mississippi		–		–	13	–	12	.520
Portland State		–		–	14	–	13	.519
Stetson		–		–	14	–	13	.519
Oral Roberts		–		–	13	–	14	.481
Xavier		–		–	13	–	14	.481
Cleveland State		–		–	12	–	13	.480
Tennessee State		–		–	11	–	12	.478
Catholic		–		–	12	–	14	.462
Manhattan		–		–	12	–	14	.462
Georgia Southern		–		–	12	–	15	.444
Northwestern State		–		–	12	–	15	.444
Connecticut		–		–	11	–	15	.423
Old Dominion		–		–	11	–	15	.423
Vermont		–		–	11	–	15	.423
Boston University		–		–	10	–	15	.400
Hardin–Simmons		–		–	10	–	16	.385
Campbell		–		–	9	–	15	.375
Centenary (LA)		–		–	10	–	17	.370
Denver		–		–	10	–	17	.370
Colgate		–		–	9	–	17	.346
East Carolina		–		–	9	–	17	.346
Fordham		–		–	8	–	18	.308
Long Island		–		–	8	–	18	.308
Saint Peter's		–		–	8	–	18	.308
Baptist		–		–	8	–	19	.296
Samford		–		–	8	–	19	.296
Canisius		–		–	7	–	19	.269
Houston Baptist		–		–	7	–	19	.269
New Hampshire		–		–	7	–	19	.269
Wagner		–		–	7	–	19	.269
Evansville		–		–	1	–	3	.250
Fairleigh Dickinson		–		–	6	–	18	.250
Valparaiso		–		–	6	–	19	.240
Robert Morris		–		–	4	–	19	.174
Richmond		–		–	4	–	22	.154
Hawaii		–		–	1	–	26	.037
Rankings from AP Poll

The 1977–78 Rhode Island Rams men's basketball team represented the University of Rhode Island as an NCAA independent during the 1977–78 college basketball season. The team was led by second-year head coach Jack Kraft and played their home games at Keaney Gymnasium. They finished the season 24–7 and were invited to the 1978 NCAA tournament. In the opening round, they narrowly lost to Duke, 63–62.

== Roster ==
1977–78 Rhode Island Rams men's basketball team
Players	Coaches
Pos. / # / Name / Height / Weight / Year / Hometown; F / 35 / Sly Williams / 6 ft 7 in (2.01 m) / 205 lb (93 kg) / So / New Haven, Connecticut	Head coach: Jack Kraft; Assistant coach(es) Legend: (C) Team captain; (S) Suspended; (I) Ineligible; (W) Walk-on; Injured; Current redshirt

== Schedule and results ==
Date time, TV	Rank^{#}	Opponent^{#}	Result	Record	Site (attendance) city, state
Regular season
Nov 25, 1977*		vs. Ohio; IPTAY Tournament	W 81–69	1–0	Littlejohn Coliseum; Clemson, South Carolina
Nov 26, 1977*		at Clemson; IPTAY Tournament Final	L 75–82	1–1	Littlejohn Coliseum; Clemson, South Carolina
Nov 30, 1977*		Brown	W 83–59	2–1	Keaney Gymnasium; Kingston, Rhode Island
Dec 2, 1977*		vs. Michigan State; Carrier Classic	L 64–92	2–2	Manley Field House; Syracuse, New York
Dec 3, 1977*		vs. Le Moyne; Carrier Classic	W 84–57	3–2	Manley Field House; Syracuse, New York
Dec 7, 1977*		at La Salle	W 78–73	4–2	The Palestra; Philadelphia, Pennsylvania
Dec 10, 1977*		Saint Joseph's	W 65–61	5–2	Keaney Gymnasium; Kingston, Rhode Island
Dec 14, 1977*		Manhattan	W 66–64	6–2	Keaney Gymnasium; Kingston, Rhode Island
Dec 22, 1977*		at Stanford	L 74–76	6–3	Maples Pavilion; Stanford, California
Dec 23, 1977*		at No. 11 San Francisco	W 87–85	7–3	War Memorial Gymnasium; San Francisco, California
Dec 28, 1977*		vs. Texas Tech; Rainbow Classic	L 73–78 ^{OT}	7–4	Neal S. Blaisdell Center; Honolulu, Hawaii
Dec 29, 1977*		vs. BYU; Rainbow Classic	W 92–87	8–4	Neal S. Blaisdell Center; Honolulu, Hawaii
Dec 30, 1977*		vs. Lafayette; Rainbow Classic	W 64–60	9–4	Neal S. Blaisdell Center; Honolulu, Hawaii
Jan 7, 1978*		Biscayne	W 78–66	10–4	Keaney Gymnasium; Kingston, Rhode Island
Jan 10, 1978*		Connecticut	W 78–68	11–4	Providence Civic Center; Providence, Rhode Island
Jan 16, 1978*		at No. 12 New Hampshire	W 99–64	12–4	Lundholm Gymnasium; Durham, New Hampshire
Jan 25, 1978*		Richmond	W 87–48	13–4	Keaney Gymnasium; Kingston, Rhode Island
Jan 28, 1978*		Stonehill	W 101–63	14–4	Keaney Gymnasium; Kingston, Rhode Island
Feb 1, 1978*		South Carolina	L 59–61	14–5	Providence Civic Center; Providence, Rhode Island
Feb 4, 1978*		at No. 16 Providence	L 59–79	14–6	Providence Civic Center (12,022); Providence, Rhode Island
Feb 11, 1978*		at Connecticut	W 70–61	15–6	Hugh S. Greer Field House; Storrs, Connecticut
Feb 13, 1978*		Wake Forest	W 89–77	16–6	Providence Civic Center; Providence, Rhode Island
Feb 14, 1978*		at Boston College	W 84–82	17–6	Roberts Center; Chestnut Hill, Massachusetts
Feb 18, 1978*		King's	W 82–71	18–6	Kearney Gymnasium; Kingston, Rhode Island
Feb 21, 1978*		No. 11 Providence	W 73–64	19–6	Providence Civic Center (12,150); Providence, Rhode Island
Feb 25, 1978*		Massachusetts	W 82–75	20–6	Kearney Gymnasium; Kingston, Rhode Island
Feb 26, 1978*		Boston University	W 79–68	21–6	Kearney Gymnasium; Kingston, Rhode Island
Feb 28, 1978*		at Brown	W 86–63	22–6	Marvel Gymnasium; Providence, Rhode Island
Mar 2, 1978*		Fairfield	W 71–69	23–6	Kearney Gymnasium; Kingston, Rhode Island
Mar 4, 1978*		vs. No. 18 Providence; ECAC New England Regionals	W 65–62	24–6	Providence Civic Center (12,150); Providence, Rhode Island
NCAA tournament
Mar 12, 1978*		vs. No. 8 Duke; First round	L 62–63	24–7	Charlotte Coliseum; Charlotte, North Carolina
*Non-conference game. ^{#}Rankings from AP poll. (#) Tournament seedings in parentheses. E=East. All times are in EST.
