= 1977–78 Illinois State Redbirds men's basketball team =

American college basketball season

1977–78 Illinois State Redbirds men's basketball

Charlotte Invitational champion

NIT, First Round
- Conference: Independent
- Record: 24–4
- Head coach: Gene Smithson (3rd season)
- Assistant coaches: Ron Ferguson; Bill Flanagan; Jeff Jones; Roger Powell
- Home arena: Horton Field House

1977–78 NCAA Division I men's basketball independents standings
| | Conf. | | | | Overall |
| Team | W | | L | PCT | W | | L | PCT |
|---|---|---|---|---|---|---|---|---|
| No. 3 DePaul | | – | | – | 27 | – | 3 | .900 |
| No. 18 Detroit | | – | | – | 25 | – | 4 | .862 |
| Illinois State | | – | | – | 24 | – | 4 | .857 |
| No. 8 Marquette | | – | | – | 24 | – | 4 | .857 |
| Pan American | | – | | – | 22 | – | 4 | .846 |
| VCU | | – | | – | 24 | – | 5 | .828 |
| Fairfield | | – | | – | 22 | – | 5 | .815 |
| North Texas State | | – | | – | 22 | – | 6 | .786 |
| Syracuse | | – | | – | 22 | – | 6 | .786 |
| Rhode Island | | – | | – | 24 | – | 7 | .774 |
| Providence | | – | | – | 24 | – | 8 | .750 |
| St. John's | | – | | – | 21 | – | 7 | .750 |
| Utah State | | – | | – | 21 | – | 7 | .750 |
| Georgetown | | – | | – | 23 | – | 8 | .742 |
| No. 6 Notre Dame | | – | | – | 23 | – | 8 | .742 |
| Holy Cross | | – | | – | 20 | – | 7 | .741 |
| Northeast Louisiana | | – | | – | 20 | – | 7 | .741 |
| UNC Wilmington | | – | | – | 19 | – | 7 | .731 |
| St. Bonaventure | | – | | – | 21 | – | 8 | .724 |
| UNLV | | – | | – | 20 | – | 8 | .714 |
| Virginia Tech | | – | | – | 19 | – | 8 | .704 |
| James Madison | | – | | – | 18 | – | 8 | .692 |
| Maine | | – | | – | 17 | – | 8 | .680 |
| Army | | – | | – | 19 | – | 9 | .679 |
| Dayton | | – | | – | 19 | – | 10 | .655 |
| St. Francis (NY) | | – | | – | 16 | – | 9 | .640 |
| Iona | | – | | – | 17 | – | 10 | .630 |
| William & Mary | | – | | – | 16 | – | 10 | .615 |
| Air Force | | – | | – | 15 | – | 10 | .600 |
| Loyola (IL) | | – | | – | 16 | – | 11 | .593 |
| Mercer | | – | | – | 16 | – | 11 | .593 |
| Oklahoma City | | – | | – | 16 | – | 11 | .593 |
| Seton Hall | | – | | – | 16 | – | 11 | .593 |
| Boston College | | – | | – | 15 | – | 11 | .577 |
| Butler | | – | | – | 15 | – | 11 | .577 |
| Saint Francis (PA) | | – | | – | 15 | – | 11 | .577 |
| South Carolina | | – | | – | 16 | – | 12 | .571 |
| Siena | | – | | – | 13 | – | 10 | .565 |
| Navy | | – | | – | 14 | – | 11 | .560 |
| Milwaukee | | – | | – | 15 | – | 12 | .556 |
| Niagara | | – | | – | 14 | – | 12 | .538 |
| Northeastern | | – | | – | 14 | – | 12 | .538 |
| Southern Mississippi | | – | | – | 13 | – | 12 | .520 |
| Portland State | | – | | – | 14 | – | 13 | .519 |
| Stetson | | – | | – | 14 | – | 13 | .519 |
| Oral Roberts | | – | | – | 13 | – | 14 | .481 |
| Xavier | | – | | – | 13 | – | 14 | .481 |
| Cleveland State | | – | | – | 12 | – | 13 | .480 |
| Tennessee State | | – | | – | 11 | – | 12 | .478 |
| Catholic | | – | | – | 12 | – | 14 | .462 |
| Manhattan | | – | | – | 12 | – | 14 | .462 |
| Georgia Southern | | – | | – | 12 | – | 15 | .444 |
| Northwestern State | | – | | – | 12 | – | 15 | .444 |
| Connecticut | | – | | – | 11 | – | 15 | .423 |
| Old Dominion | | – | | – | 11 | – | 15 | .423 |
| Vermont | | – | | – | 11 | – | 15 | .423 |
| Boston University | | – | | – | 10 | – | 15 | .400 |
| Hardin–Simmons | | – | | – | 10 | – | 16 | .385 |
| Campbell | | – | | – | 9 | – | 15 | .375 |
| Centenary (LA) | | – | | – | 10 | – | 17 | .370 |
| Denver | | – | | – | 10 | – | 17 | .370 |
| Colgate | | – | | – | 9 | – | 17 | .346 |
| East Carolina | | – | | – | 9 | – | 17 | .346 |
| Fordham | | – | | – | 8 | – | 18 | .308 |
| Long Island | | – | | – | 8 | – | 18 | .308 |
| Saint Peter's | | – | | – | 8 | – | 18 | .308 |
| Baptist | | – | | – | 8 | – | 19 | .296 |
| Samford | | – | | – | 8 | – | 19 | .296 |
| Canisius | | – | | – | 7 | – | 19 | .269 |
| Houston Baptist | | – | | – | 7 | – | 19 | .269 |
| New Hampshire | | – | | – | 7 | – | 19 | .269 |
| Wagner | | – | | – | 7 | – | 19 | .269 |
| Evansville | | – | | – | 1 | – | 3 | .250 |
| Fairleigh Dickinson | | – | | – | 6 | – | 18 | .250 |
| Valparaiso | | – | | – | 6 | – | 19 | .240 |
| Robert Morris | | – | | – | 4 | – | 19 | .174 |
| Richmond | | – | | – | 4 | – | 22 | .154 |
| Hawaii | | – | | – | 1 | – | 26 | .037 |
Rankings from AP Poll

The 1977–78 Illinois State Redbirds men's basketball team represented Illinois State University during the 1977–78 NCAA Division I men's basketball season. The Redbirds, led by third year head coach Gene Smithson, played their home games at Horton Field House and competed as an independent (not a member of a conference). They finished the season 24–4.

The Redbirds received an invitation to the 1978 National Invitation Tournament. They were beaten by Indiana State University in the first round.

== Roster ==
1977–78 Illinois State Redbirds men's basketball team
Players
Coaches

| Pos. | # | Name | Height | Weight | Year | Hometown |
|---|---|---|---|---|---|---|
| F | 10 | Billy Lewis | 6 ft 6 in (1.98 m) | 195 lb (88 kg) | Sr | Chicago, IL |
| G | 31 | Rick Ferina | 6 ft 4 in (1.93 m) | 180 lb (82 kg) | Jr | Niles, IL |
| G | 21 | Derrick Mayes | 6 ft 1 in (1.85 m) | 170 lb (77 kg) | Jr | Elgin, IL |
| C | 32 | Joe Galvin | 7 ft 0 in (2.13 m) | 218 lb (99 kg) | So | Bloomington, IL |
| G | 13 | Ron Jones | 6 ft 5 in (1.96 m) | 175 lb (79 kg) | So | Venice, IL |
| F | 35 | Larry Lowe | 6 ft 7 in (2.01 m) | 190 lb (86 kg) | So | Glenwood, IL |
| F | 42 | Robert McCoy | 6 ft 5 in (1.96 m) | 195 lb (88 kg) | So | Chicago Heights, IL |
| F | 45 | Del Yarbrough | 6 ft 7 in (2.01 m) | 220 lb (100 kg) | So | North Chicago, IL |
| C | 52 | Roy Herold | 6 ft 8 in (2.03 m) | 205 lb (93 kg) | Fr | Helsinki, Finland |
| F | 55 | Anthony Jones (W) | 6 ft 6 in (1.98 m) | 186 lb (84 kg) | Fr | Chicago, IL |
| G | 23 | Dave Nussbaumer (W) | 6 ft 0 in (1.83 m) | 172 lb (78 kg) | Fr | McLean, VA |
| G | 44 | Randy Smithson | 6 ft 3 in (1.91 m) | 180 lb (82 kg) | Fr | Normal, IL |
| F | 24 | McKay Smith | 6 ft 5 in (1.96 m) | 165 lb (75 kg) | Fr | Springfield, IL |

Head coach

- Gene Smithson (North Central (IL))

Assistant coach(es)

- Ron Ferguson (Illinois)
- Bill Flanagan (Monmouth (IL))
- Jeff Jones (Illinois State)
- Roger Powell (Illinois State)

Legend

- (C) Team captain
- (S) Suspended
- (I) Ineligible
- (W) Walk-on
- Injured
- Current redshirt

== Schedule ==
| Date time, TV | Rank^{#} | Opponent^{#} | Result | Record | High points | High rebounds | High assists | Site (attendance) city, state |
Regular Season
| November 26, 1977*; 7:30 pm | | at Saint Louis | W 90–83 | 1–0 | 22 – Lewis | 9 – Lewis, Galvin | – | Kiel Auditorium (5,117); St. Louis, MO |
| November 29, 1977*; 7:30 pm | | Valparaiso | W 98–81 | 2–0 | 19 – Lewis | 9 – Galvin | – | Horton Field House (5,700); Normal, IL |
| December 2, 1977*; 8:00 pm | | vs. Colgate; Charlotte Invitational [Semifinal] | W 94–62 | 3–0 | 21 – Galvin | 12 – Galvin | – | Charlotte Coliseum (I) (2,107); Charlotte, NC |
| December 3, 1977*; 8:00 pm | | vs. Delaware; Charlotte Invitational [Final] | W 89–70 | 4–0 | 21 – Lewis | 13 – Lewis | – | Charlotte Coliseum (I) (400); Charlotte, NC |
| December 5, 1977*; 7:30 pm | | California State–Northridge | W 72–59 | 5–0 | 24 – Lewis | 11 – Galvin | – | Horton Field House (3,800); Normal, IL |
| December 7, 1977*; 7:35 pm | | at Southern Illinois | W 51–48 | 6–0 | 16 – Lewis | 8 – Lewis | – | SIU Arena (6,320); Carbondale, IL |
| December 10, 1977*; 7:30 pm | | Akron | W 86–70 | 7–0 | 33 – Lewis | 11 – Lewis | – | Horton Field House (6,000); Normal, IL |
| December 17, 1977*; 3:00 pm | | New Orleans | W 93–86 ^{OT} | 8–0 | 30 – Lewis | 12 – Lewis | – | Horton Field House (5,400); Normal, IL |
| December 19, 1977*; 7:30 pm | | Central Michigan | W 90–78 | 9–0 | 20 – Lewis | 12 – Galvin | – | Horton Field House (5,000); Normal, IL |
| December 26, 1977*; 7:30 pm | | Kent State | W 79–71 | 10–0 | 21 – Galvin | 15 – Galvin | – | Horton Field House (5,000); Normal, IL |
| December 30, 1977*; 7:30 pm | | Long Island | W 93–68 | 11–0 | 27 – Lewis | 13 – Lewis | – | Horton Field House (5,500); Normal, IL |
| January 2, 1978*; 7:30 pm | | at Bradley | W 84–83 | 12–0 | 24 – Mayes | 8 – Lewis, Yarbrough | – | Robertson Memorial Field House (7,300); Peoria, IL |
| January 5, 1978*; 10:05 pm | | at California–Santa Barbara | L 69–84 | 12–1 | 22 – Jones | 6 – Lewis, Yarbrough | – | Robertson Gymnasium (2,100); Santa Barbara, CA |
| January 7, 1978*; 9:30 pm | | at California State–Fullerton | W 88–85 | 13–1 | 21 – Jones | 7 – Jones | – | Titan Gym (3,390); Fullerton, CA |
| January 11, 1978*; 7:30 pm | | Northern Illinois | W 79–67 | 14–1 | 19 – Jones | 16 – Yarbrough | – | Horton Field House (8,000); Normal, IL |
| January 13, 1978*; 10:15 pm | | at No. 11 Nevada–Las Vegas | L 92–94 | 14–2 | 34 – Jones | 10 – Jones | – | Las Vegas Convention Center (6,352); Winchester, NV |
| January 15, 1978*; 7:30 pm | | Quincy | W 86–76 | 15–2 | 27 – Lewis | 14 – Lewis | – | Horton Field House (3,000); Normal, IL |
| January 18, 1978*; 7:30 pm | | Evansville | canceled as result of Air Indiana Flight 216 crash on December 13, 1977 | | | | | Horton Field House; Normal, IL |
| January 21, 1978*; 2:00 pm | | No. 4 Indiana State | W 81–76 | 16–2 | 25 – Lewis | 12 – Lewis | – | Horton Field House (8,000); Normal, IL |
| January 25, 1978*; 7:30 pm | No. 20 | Northern Michigan | W 75–58 | 17–2 | 34 – Lewis | 8 – Lewis | – | Horton Field House (4,000); Normal, IL |
| January 28, 1978*; 7:30 pm | No. 20 | Southern Illinois–Edwardsville | W 80–73 | 18–2 | 19 – Lewis | 12 – Lewis | – | Horton Field House (6,800); Normal, IL |
| February 6, 1978*; 7:30 pm | No. 19 | Oral Roberts | W 84–71 | 19–2 | 19 – Galvin | 10 – Galvin, Yarbrough | – | Horton Field House (7,500); Normal, IL |
| February 8, 1978*; 7:30 pm | No. 15 | at Western Illinois | W 97–79 | 20–2 | 29 – Lewis | 11 – Lewis, Jones | – | Western Hall (4,095); Macomb, IL |
| February 15, 1978*; 7:30 pm | No. 15 | at Northern Illinois | W 79–67 | 21–2 | 18 – Lewis | 13 – Lewis | – | Chick Evans Field House (5,820); DeKalb, IL |
| February 18, 1978*; 2:00 pm | No. 15 | Athletes In Action; Exhibition | L 97–100 ^{OT} | | – | – | – | Horton Field House; Normal, IL |
| February 20, 1978*; 7:30 pm | No. 15 | McNeese State | W 87–68 | 22–2 | 23 – Lewis | 9 – Lewis | – | Horton Field House (6,000); Normal, IL |
| February 25, 1978*; 8:00 pm | No. 15 | at Centenary | W 90–77 | 23–2 | 27 – Lewis | 13 – Galvin | – | Gold Dome (2,018); Shreveport, LA |
| February 28, 1978*; 7:30 pm | No. 13 | at Northern Iowa | W 82–76 | 24–2 | 25 – Lewis, Jones | 9 – Jones | – | UNI Dome (4,700); Cedar Falls, IA |
| March 4, 1978*; 8:00 pm | No. 13 | at No. 4 DePaul | L 84–96 | 24–3 | 22 – Yarbrough | 11 – Yarbrough | – | Alumni Hall (5,717); Chicago, IL |
National Invitation {NIT} Tournament
| March 10, 1978*; 6:30 pm | No. 17 | at Indiana State; First Round | L 71–73 | 24–4 | 18 – Lewis | 6 – Lewis, Galvin | 9 – Mayes | Hulman Civic University Center (10,150); Terre Haute, IN |
*Non-conference game. ^{#}Rankings from AP Poll. (#) Tournament seedings in parentheses. All times are in Central Standard Time.
