= 1977–78 St. Bonaventure Brown Indians men's basketball team =

American college basketball season

1977–78 St. Bonaventure Brown Indians men's basketball

NCAA tournament
- Conference: Independent
- Record: 21–8
- Head coach: Jim Satalin (5th season)
- Home arena: Reilly Center

1977–78 NCAA Division I men's basketball independents standings
	Conf.				Overall
Team	W		L	PCT	W		L	PCT
No. 3 DePaul		–		–	27	–	3	.900
No. 18 Detroit		–		–	25	–	4	.862
Illinois State		–		–	24	–	4	.857
No. 8 Marquette		–		–	24	–	4	.857
Pan American		–		–	22	–	4	.846
VCU		–		–	24	–	5	.828
Fairfield		–		–	22	–	5	.815
North Texas State		–		–	22	–	6	.786
Syracuse		–		–	22	–	6	.786
Rhode Island		–		–	24	–	7	.774
Providence		–		–	24	–	8	.750
St. John's		–		–	21	–	7	.750
Utah State		–		–	21	–	7	.750
Georgetown		–		–	23	–	8	.742
No. 6 Notre Dame		–		–	23	–	8	.742
Holy Cross		–		–	20	–	7	.741
Northeast Louisiana		–		–	20	–	7	.741
UNC Wilmington		–		–	19	–	7	.731
St. Bonaventure		–		–	21	–	8	.724
UNLV		–		–	20	–	8	.714
Virginia Tech		–		–	19	–	8	.704
James Madison		–		–	18	–	8	.692
Maine		–		–	17	–	8	.680
Army		–		–	19	–	9	.679
Dayton		–		–	19	–	10	.655
St. Francis (NY)		–		–	16	–	9	.640
Iona		–		–	17	–	10	.630
William & Mary		–		–	16	–	10	.615
Air Force		–		–	15	–	10	.600
Loyola (IL)		–		–	16	–	11	.593
Mercer		–		–	16	–	11	.593
Oklahoma City		–		–	16	–	11	.593
Seton Hall		–		–	16	–	11	.593
Boston College		–		–	15	–	11	.577
Butler		–		–	15	–	11	.577
Saint Francis (PA)		–		–	15	–	11	.577
South Carolina		–		–	16	–	12	.571
Siena		–		–	13	–	10	.565
Navy		–		–	14	–	11	.560
Milwaukee		–		–	15	–	12	.556
Niagara		–		–	14	–	12	.538
Northeastern		–		–	14	–	12	.538
Southern Mississippi		–		–	13	–	12	.520
Portland State		–		–	14	–	13	.519
Stetson		–		–	14	–	13	.519
Oral Roberts		–		–	13	–	14	.481
Xavier		–		–	13	–	14	.481
Cleveland State		–		–	12	–	13	.480
Tennessee State		–		–	11	–	12	.478
Catholic		–		–	12	–	14	.462
Manhattan		–		–	12	–	14	.462
Georgia Southern		–		–	12	–	15	.444
Northwestern State		–		–	12	–	15	.444
Connecticut		–		–	11	–	15	.423
Old Dominion		–		–	11	–	15	.423
Vermont		–		–	11	–	15	.423
Boston University		–		–	10	–	15	.400
Hardin–Simmons		–		–	10	–	16	.385
Campbell		–		–	9	–	15	.375
Centenary (LA)		–		–	10	–	17	.370
Denver		–		–	10	–	17	.370
Colgate		–		–	9	–	17	.346
East Carolina		–		–	9	–	17	.346
Fordham		–		–	8	–	18	.308
Long Island		–		–	8	–	18	.308
Saint Peter's		–		–	8	–	18	.308
Baptist		–		–	8	–	19	.296
Samford		–		–	8	–	19	.296
Canisius		–		–	7	–	19	.269
Houston Baptist		–		–	7	–	19	.269
New Hampshire		–		–	7	–	19	.269
Wagner		–		–	7	–	19	.269
Evansville		–		–	1	–	3	.250
Fairleigh Dickinson		–		–	6	–	18	.250
Valparaiso		–		–	6	–	19	.240
Robert Morris		–		–	4	–	19	.174
Richmond		–		–	4	–	22	.154
Hawaii		–		–	1	–	26	.037
Rankings from AP Poll

The 1977–78 St. Bonaventure Brown Indians men's basketball team represented St. Bonaventure University during the 1977–78 NCAA Division I men's basketball season. The Brown Indians were independent and not a member of a conference. They were led by ninth year head coach Jim Satalin. St. Bonaventure advanced to the NCAA tournament where they fell to Penn in the opening round.

== Roster ==
1977–78 St. Bonaventure Brown Indians men's basketball team
Players
Coaches

Pos.	#	Name	Height	Weight	Year	Hometown
G	23	Glenn Hagan	6 ft 0 in (1.83 m)	170 lb (77 kg)	Sr	Rochester, New York
F	53	Greg Sanders	6 ft 6 in (1.98 m)	—	Sr

Head coach

- Jim Satalin (St. Bonaventure)

Assistant coach(es)

Legend

- (C) Team captain
- (S) Suspended
- (I) Ineligible
- (W) Walk-on
- Injured
- Current redshirt

== Schedule/results ==
Date time, TV	Rank^{#}	Opponent^{#}	Result	Record	Site (attendance) city, state
Regular season
Nov 30, 1977*		Scranton	W 84–74	1–0	Reilly Center; St. Bonaventure, New York
Dec 3, 1977*		Georgetown	W 71–67	2–0	Reilly Center (5,319); St. Bonaventure, New York
Dec 6, 1977*		Cornell	W 61–51	3–0	Reilly Center; St. Bonaventure, New York
Dec 10, 1977*		at No. 18 Syracuse	L 81–107	3–1	Manley Field House; Syracuse, New York
Dec 12, 1977*		No. 16 Detroit	L 92–94	3–2	Reilly Center; St. Bonaventure, New York
Dec 27, 1977*		vs. Florida; Gator Bowl Tourney	L 75–88	3–3	Gator Bowl Stadium; Jacksonville, Florida
Dec 28, 1977*		at Jacksonville; Gator Bowl Tourney	W 103–75	4–3	Gator Bowl Stadium; Jacksonville, Florida
Jan 2, 1978*		Iona	W 93–85	5–3	Reilly Center; St. Bonaventure, New York
Jan 4, 1978*		Howard	W 108–74	6–3	Reilly Center; St. Bonaventure, New York
Jan 8, 1978*		at Virginia Tech	L 89–94	6–4	Cassell Coliseum; Blacksburg, Virginia
Jan 11, 1978*		UW Milwaukee	W 70–68	7–4	Reilly Center; St. Bonaventure, New York
Jan 14, 1978*		No. 5 Notre Dame	L 78–79	7–5	Rochester War Memorial; Rochester, New York
Jan 18, 1978*		Long Island	W 111–83	8–5	Reilly Center; St. Bonaventure, New York
Jan 21, 1978*		at Canisius	W 96–60	9–5	Buffalo Memorial Auditorium; Buffalo, New York
Jan 25, 1978*		at Hofstra	W 83–73	10–5	Hofstra Physical Fitness Center; Hempstead, New York
Jan 28, 1978*		Niagara	W 89–76	11–5	Reilly Center; St. Bonaventure, New York
Jan 30, 1978*		at St. Francis (NY)	W 90–72	12–5	Generoso Pope Athletic Complex; Brooklyn, New York
Feb 2, 1978*		No. 16 Providence	W 72–64	13–5	Reilly Center; St. Bonaventure, New York
Feb 4, 1978*		Jacksonville	W 94–89	14–5	Reilly Center; St. Bonaventure, New York
Feb 8, 1978*		at Villanova	L 76–91	14–6	Villanova Field House; Villanova, Pennsylvania
Feb 13, 1978*		Canisius	W 97–88	15–6	Reilly Center; St. Bonaventure, New York
Feb 18, 1978*		Duquesne	W 82–80	16–6	Reilly Center; St. Bonaventure, New York
Feb 20, 1978*		at Fairfield	L 81–92	16–7	Alumni Hall; Fairfield, Connecticut
Feb 22, 1978*		La Salle	W 108–95	17–7	Reilly Center; St. Bonaventure, New York
Feb 25, 1978*		at Niagara	W 69–67	18–7	Niagara Falls Convention and Civic Center; Niagara Falls, New York
Feb 27, 1978*		at Saint Francis (PA)	W 75–72	19–7	DeGol Arena; Loretto, Pennsylvania
Mar 1, 1978*		vs. No. 14 Syracuse; ECAC Upstate Playoffs	W 70–69	20–7	Rochester War Memorial; Rochester, New York
Mar 4, 1978*		vs. VCU; ECAC Upstate Playoffs	W 63–61	21–7	Rochester War Memorial; Rochester, New York
NCAA tournament
Mar 12, 1978*	(E 2L)	vs. (E 4Q) No. 20 Penn; First round	L 83–92	21–8	The Palestra; Philadelphia, Pennsylvania
*Non-conference game. ^{#}Rankings from AP Poll. (#) Tournament seedings in parentheses. E=East. All times are in Eastern Time.
