= 1977–78 DePaul Blue Demons men's basketball team =

American college basketball season

1977–78 DePaul Blue Demons men's basketball
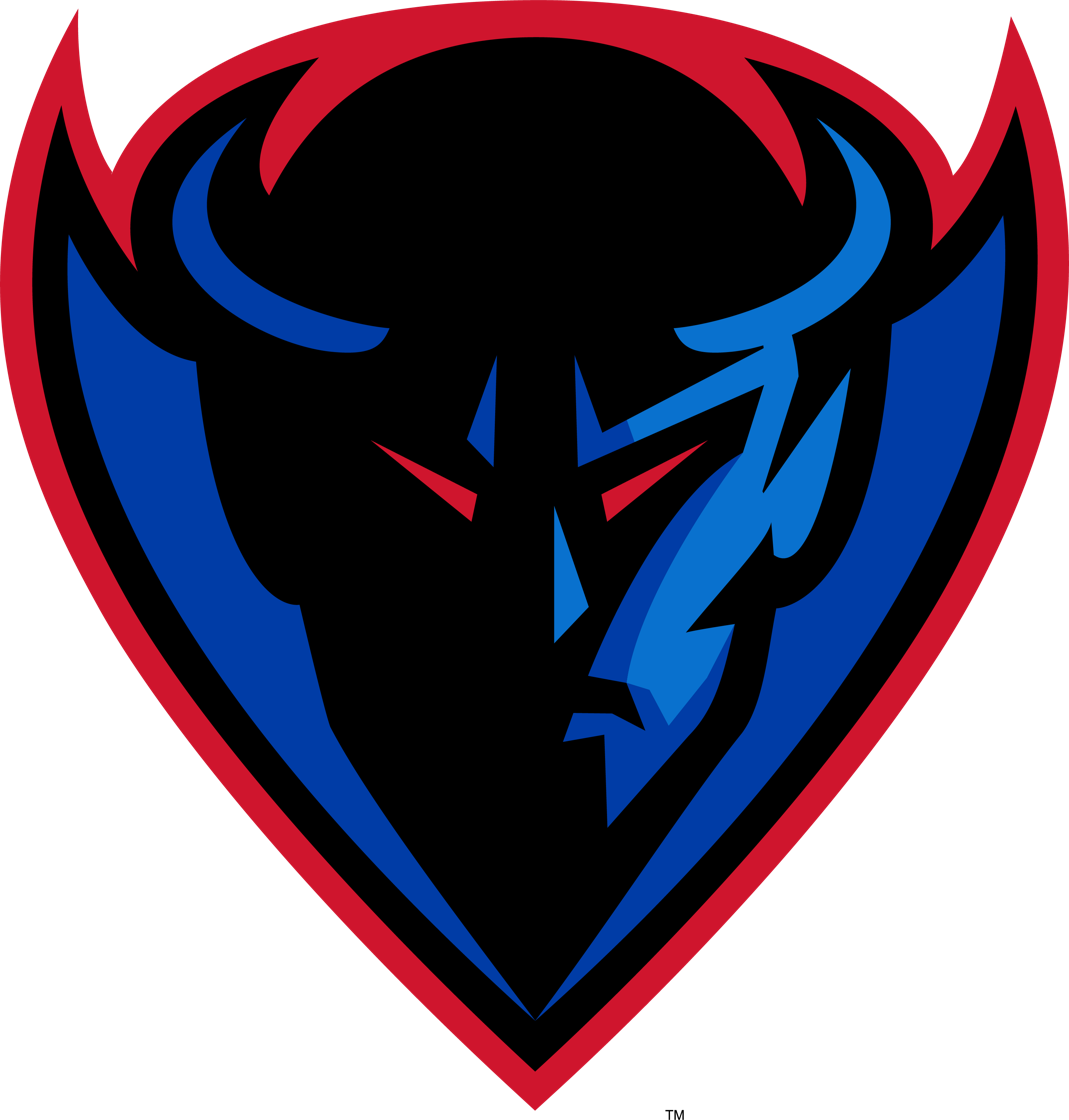

NCAA tournament, Elite Eight
- Conference: Independent

Ranking
- Coaches: No. 7
- AP: No. 3
- Record: 27–3
- Head coach: Ray Meyer (36th season)
- Assistant coach: Joey Meyer (4th season)
- Home arena: Alumni Hall

1977–78 NCAA Division I men's basketball independents standings
	Conf.				Overall
Team	W		L	PCT	W		L	PCT
No. 3 DePaul		–		–	27	–	3	.900
No. 18 Detroit		–		–	25	–	4	.862
Illinois State		–		–	24	–	4	.857
No. 8 Marquette		–		–	24	–	4	.857
Pan American		–		–	22	–	4	.846
VCU		–		–	24	–	5	.828
Fairfield		–		–	22	–	5	.815
North Texas State		–		–	22	–	6	.786
Syracuse		–		–	22	–	6	.786
Rhode Island		–		–	24	–	7	.774
Providence		–		–	24	–	8	.750
St. John's		–		–	21	–	7	.750
Utah State		–		–	21	–	7	.750
Georgetown		–		–	23	–	8	.742
No. 6 Notre Dame		–		–	23	–	8	.742
Holy Cross		–		–	20	–	7	.741
Northeast Louisiana		–		–	20	–	7	.741
UNC Wilmington		–		–	19	–	7	.731
St. Bonaventure		–		–	21	–	8	.724
UNLV		–		–	20	–	8	.714
Virginia Tech		–		–	19	–	8	.704
James Madison		–		–	18	–	8	.692
Maine		–		–	17	–	8	.680
Army		–		–	19	–	9	.679
Dayton		–		–	19	–	10	.655
St. Francis (NY)		–		–	16	–	9	.640
Iona		–		–	17	–	10	.630
William & Mary		–		–	16	–	10	.615
Air Force		–		–	15	–	10	.600
Loyola (IL)		–		–	16	–	11	.593
Mercer		–		–	16	–	11	.593
Oklahoma City		–		–	16	–	11	.593
Seton Hall		–		–	16	–	11	.593
Boston College		–		–	15	–	11	.577
Butler		–		–	15	–	11	.577
Saint Francis (PA)		–		–	15	–	11	.577
South Carolina		–		–	16	–	12	.571
Siena		–		–	13	–	10	.565
Navy		–		–	14	–	11	.560
Milwaukee		–		–	15	–	12	.556
Niagara		–		–	14	–	12	.538
Northeastern		–		–	14	–	12	.538
Southern Mississippi		–		–	13	–	12	.520
Portland State		–		–	14	–	13	.519
Stetson		–		–	14	–	13	.519
Oral Roberts		–		–	13	–	14	.481
Xavier		–		–	13	–	14	.481
Cleveland State		–		–	12	–	13	.480
Tennessee State		–		–	11	–	12	.478
Catholic		–		–	12	–	14	.462
Manhattan		–		–	12	–	14	.462
Georgia Southern		–		–	12	–	15	.444
Northwestern State		–		–	12	–	15	.444
Connecticut		–		–	11	–	15	.423
Old Dominion		–		–	11	–	15	.423
Vermont		–		–	11	–	15	.423
Boston University		–		–	10	–	15	.400
Hardin–Simmons		–		–	10	–	16	.385
Campbell		–		–	9	–	15	.375
Centenary (LA)		–		–	10	–	17	.370
Denver		–		–	10	–	17	.370
Colgate		–		–	9	–	17	.346
East Carolina		–		–	9	–	17	.346
Fordham		–		–	8	–	18	.308
Long Island		–		–	8	–	18	.308
Saint Peter's		–		–	8	–	18	.308
Baptist		–		–	8	–	19	.296
Samford		–		–	8	–	19	.296
Canisius		–		–	7	–	19	.269
Houston Baptist		–		–	7	–	19	.269
New Hampshire		–		–	7	–	19	.269
Wagner		–		–	7	–	19	.269
Evansville		–		–	1	–	3	.250
Fairleigh Dickinson		–		–	6	–	18	.250
Valparaiso		–		–	6	–	19	.240
Robert Morris		–		–	4	–	19	.174
Richmond		–		–	4	–	22	.154
Hawaii		–		–	1	–	26	.037
Rankings from AP Poll

The 1977–78 DePaul Blue Demons men's basketball team represented DePaul University during the 1977–78 NCAA Division I men's basketball season. They were led by head coach Ray Meyer, in his 36th season, and played their home games at the Alumni Hall in Chicago. After starting the season unranked, the Blue Demons won 25 of 27 games to earn a top five ranking and the top at-large seed in the Midwest region of the NCAA tournament. DePaul began tournament play by defeating Creighton and Louisville, before losing to Notre Dame in the Midwest regional final. They finished the season with an overall record of 27–3.

Senior Dave Corzine established school records for single-season (630) and career (1,896) scoring, the latter surpassing the legendary George Mikan's total from 32 years prior. The single-season mark would only last a year as incoming freshman Mark Aguirre established a benchmark that still stands (767). Corzine also established the career rebounds total at DePaul (1,151) – a record that still persists to this day.

== Roster ==
1977–78 DePaul Blue Demons men's basketball team
Players
Coaches

Pos.	#	Name	Height	Weight	Year	Previous school	Hometown
G	10	Randy Ramsey	6 ft 1 in (1.85 m)	185 lb (84 kg)	Sr	Thornton Township	Harvey, IL
G	12	Randy Hook	6 ft 1 in (1.85 m)	170 lb (77 kg)	Sr	East Aurora	Aurora, IL
G	14	Scott Feiereisel	6 ft 2 in (1.88 m)	185 lb (84 kg)	So	Loyola Academy	Wilmette, IL
G	15	Clyde Bradshaw	6 ft 0 in (1.83 m)	170 lb (77 kg)	Fr	East Orange	East Orange, NJ
F	21	Dennis McGuire	6 ft 7 in (2.01 m)	195 lb (88 kg)	Fr	Holy Cross	River Grove, IL
G	24	Gary Garland	6 ft 4 in (1.93 m)	180 lb (82 kg)	Jr	Clifford J. Scott	East Orange, NJ
F	30	Curtis Watkins	6 ft 5 in (1.96 m)	190 lb (86 kg)	Jr	Thornton	Harvey, IL
F	32	William Dise	6 ft 5 in (1.96 m)	190 lb (86 kg)	Sr	DuSable	Chicago, IL
C	35	Gary Wydra	7 ft 0 in (2.13 m)	225 lb (102 kg)	Sr	Foreman	Chicago, IL
C	40	Dave Corzine	6 ft 11 in (2.11 m)	245 lb (111 kg)	Sr	John Hersey	Arlington Heights, IL
F	50	Thomas Barr	6 ft 6 in (1.98 m)	185 lb (84 kg)	Fr	Maine South	Park Ridge, IL
F	54	Joe Ponsetto	6 ft 7 in (2.01 m)	210 lb (95 kg)	Sr	Proviso East	Maywood, IL
F/C		William Madey	6 ft 8 in (2.03 m)	220 lb (100 kg)	So	Gordon Tech	Chicago, IL

Head coach

- Ray Meyer (Notre Dame)

Assistant coach(es)

- Joey Meyer (DePaul)
- Ken Sarubbi

Legend

- (C) Team captain
- (S) Suspended
- (I) Ineligible
- (W) Walk-on
- Injured
- Current redshirt

Roster

== Schedule and results ==
Date time, TV	Rank^{#}	Opponent^{#}	Result	Record	Site city, state
Regular season
Nov 26, 1977*		Butler	W 93–65	1–0	Alumni Hall; Chicago, Illinois
Dec 3, 1977*		Evansville	W 94–71	2–0	Alumni Hall; Chicago, Illinois
Dec 5, 1977*		Bradley	W 89–85	3–0	Alumni Hall; Chicago, Illinois
Dec 10, 1977*		Wichita State	W 89–84	4–0	Alumni Hall; Chicago, Illinois
Dec 14, 1977*		at Wisconsin	W 85–62	5–0	UW Fieldhouse; Madison, Wisconsin
Dec 17, 1977*		Northwestern	W 83–79	6–0	Alumni Hall; Chicago, Illinois
Dec 21, 1977*		at LSU	L 67–68	6–1	LSU Assembly Center; Baton Rouge, Louisiana
Dec 23, 1977*		at Centenary	W 96–77	7–1	Gold Dome; Shreveport, Louisiana
Dec 28, 1977*		vs. Penn State; Kodak Classic	W 82–67	8–1	Blue Cross Arena; Rochester, New York
Dec 29, 1977*		vs. Yale; Kodak Classic	W 100–52	9–1	Blue Cross Arena; Rochester, New York
Jan 2, 1978*		Western Michigan	W 92–61	10–1	Alumni Hall; Chicago, Illinois
Jan 7, 1978*		Loyola (IL)	W 93–73	11–1	Alumni Hall; Chicago, Illinois
Jan 10, 1978*		at Eastern Michigan	W 91–83	12–1	Bowen Field House; Ypsilanti, Michigan
Jan 14, 1978*		at Bradley	W 80–66	13–1	Robertson Memorial Field House; Peoria, Illinois
Jan 18, 1978*		at Marquette	L 74–80	13–2	MECCA Arena (10,938); Milwaukee, Wisconsin
Jan 21, 1978*		Dayton	W 74–70	14–2	Alumni Hall; Chicago, Illinois
Jan 23, 1978*		Saint Louis	W 100–81	15–2	Alumni Hall; Chicago, Illinois
Jan 28, 1978*	No. 19	No. 9 Providence	W 78–68	16–2	Alumni Hall (5,300); Chicago, Illinois
Feb 1, 1978*	No. 13	at Creighton	W 85–82 ^{3OT}	17–2	Omaha Civic Auditorium; Omaha, Nebraska
Feb 4, 1978*		Oral Roberts	W 63–57	18–2	Alumni Hall; Chicago, Illinois
Feb 7, 1978*		Duquesne	W 83–58	19–2	Alumni Hall; Chicago, Illinois
Feb 12, 1978*	No. 11	at No. 4 Notre Dame	W 69–68 ^{OT}	20–2	Joyce Center; Notre Dame, Indiana
Feb 16, 1978*		Green Bay	W 55–49	21–2	Alumni Hall; Chicago, Illinois
Feb 18, 1978*		at Loyola (IL)	W 83–73	22–2	Alumni Gym; Chicago, Illinois
Feb 22, 1978*		at Air Force	W 54–41	23–2	Clune Arena; Colorado Springs, Colorado
Mar 1, 1978*		at Valparaiso	W 89–62	24–2	Hilltop Gym; Valparaiso, Indiana
Mar 4, 1978*	No. 4	No. 13 Illinois State	W 96–84	25–2	Alumni Hall; Chicago, Illinois
NCAA Tournament
Mar 12, 1978*	(MW 1L) No. 3	vs. (MW 3Q) Creighton; First round	W 80–78	26–2	Levitt Arena; Wichita, Kansas
Mar 17, 1978*	(MW 1L) No. 3	vs. (MW 2Q) No. 9 Louisville; Midwest Regional Semifinal – Sweet Sixteen	W 90–89 ^{2OT}	27–2	Allen Fieldhouse; Lawrence, Kansas
Mar 19, 1978*	(MW 1L) No. 3	vs. (MW 2L) No. 6 Notre Dame; Midwest Regional Final – Elite Eight	L 64–84	27–3	Allen Fieldhouse; Lawrence, Kansas
*Non-conference game. ^{#}Rankings from AP poll. (#) Tournament seedings in parentheses. MW=Midwest. All times are in Central Time.

== Rankings ==
Ranking movements Legend: ██ Increase in ranking ██ Decrease in ranking — = Not ranked
	Week																
Poll	Pre	1	2	3	4	5	6	7	8	9	10	11	12	13	14	15	Final
AP	—	—	—	—	—	—	—	20	18	19	13	11	8	7	6	4	3
Coaches	—	—	—	—	—	—	—	—	20	19	13	11	10	7	7	7	Not released

^Coaches did not release a Week 1 poll.

== Awards and honors ==
- Ray Meyer – Henry Iba Award
