= 1977–78 Evansville Purple Aces men's basketball team =

American college basketball season

1977–78 Evansville Purple Aces men's basketball
- Conference: Indiana Collegiate Conference
- Record: 1–3 (0–0 ICC)
- Head coach: Bobby Watson (1st season)
- Assistant coaches: Mark Sandy; Ernon Simpson; Stafford Stephenson
- Home arena: Roberts Municipal Stadium

The 1977–78 Evansville Purple Aces men's basketball team represented the University of Evansville during the 1977–78 NCAA Division I men's basketball season. They were coached by first-time head coach Bobby Watson after the departure of Arad McCutchan, who had spent the previous 31 years as coach of the program. Former Purple Aces player Jerry Sloan had previously accepted an offer to become the new head coach but left after six days with the team. The season was the Purple Aces' first time playing in NCAA Division I after years of success in NCAA Division II competition.

The Purple Aces lost their first two games of the season against the Western Kentucky Hilltoppers and the DePaul Blue Demons. The Purple Aces' only win of the season came in a home game on December 6, 1977, against the Pittsburgh Panthers. On December 10, the Purple Aces lost an away game to the 11th-ranked Indiana State Sycamores. On December 13, Watson and all 14 members of the varsity team were killed when their plane crashed as they travelled to play the Middle Tennessee Blue Raiders.

== Season overview ==
=== Background and coaching staff ===
In 1976, the University of Evansville declared that its sports programs would move from NCAA Division II to NCAA Division I for the 1977–78 season. In January 1977, Aces head coach Arad McCutchan announced that he would step down after 31 years in the position. His longtime choice to succeed him, former Aces player Jerry Sloan, signed a four-year contract on February 3, 1977, but resigned six days later because of personal reasons. The Aces finished with a 15–12 record during the 1976–77 season.

After Sloan's resignation, the University of Evansville's screening committee interviewed eight candidates for the position. On May 3, Bobby Watson, an assistant for the Oral Roberts Golden Eagles, was announced as head coach. He had been watching the position for years and was familiar with Indiana through recruitment trips in the tri-state area. Watson was one of three final candidates alongside Wayne Boultinghouse from ISU–Evansville and Jack Schalow from Morehead State.

On March 25, Watson signed Norvell Lee, the head coach at Goldsboro High School, as his first assistant coach. On April 21, he added assistant Stafford Stephenson, the head coach at Wingate Junior College, and graduate assistant Mark Sandy, the head coach at Herndon High School, to his coaching staff; Watson had served as an assistant alongside Stephenson at Wake Forest and Sandy was one of his players at Ferrum. On July 3, Lee stepped down as assistant coach because of his mother's poor health. Five days later, Larry Humes, an assistant coach at Howe High School and former Aces player, was signed as an assistant. On August 19, Watson announced that Humes had resigned and was to be replaced by Ernon "Ernie" Simpson, head coach at Union County High School.

=== Recruitment ===
The Aces had only six players return from their 1976–77 team so Watson recruited seven freshmen during the offseason: Mark Siegel, Kraig Heckendorn, Mike Joyner, Warren Alston, Mike Duff, Ray Comandella and Barney Lewis. They joined seniors John Ed Washington, Tony Winburn and Kevin Kingston, juniors Bryan Taylor and Steve Miller, and sophomore Keith Moon. Duff was considered the "most highly prized" of Watson's recruits; he had signed to play for the Missouri Tigers in April 1977 but changed his mind and signed with the Aces in May. Duff was a teammate of Kingston at Eldorado High School in Eldorado, Illinois. Alston and Lewis had played under Lee at Goldsboro High School. The freshmen were joined by Greg Smith who made the Aces as a walk-on. David Furr also tried out as a walk-on but injured his ankle on the first day of practice and was redshirted by Watson.

=== Non-conference regular season ===
The Aces started their non-conference regular season on November 30, 1977, at home against the Western Kentucky Hilltoppers in Roberts Municipal Stadium. Taylor, Miller, Winburn, Washington and Duff were appointed as starters with Alston assuming a sixth man role. The Aces lost to the Hilltoppers 72–82 despite Duff scoring 26 points and grabbing 13 rebounds in his collegiate debut. Watson blamed the loss on poor physical play by his forwards and considered his guards disappointing. On December 3, the Aces lost their second game 71–94 to the DePaul Blue Demons in Chicago. After the game, Watson accepted that the Aces were a young team and lacked size, stating, "We're just going to have some long nights like this. It's painful while you're learning." Miller was the Aces' leading scorer with 18 points.

For the Aces' third game against the Pittsburgh Panthers at home on December 6, freshman Heckendorn was moved into the starting line-up in place of Winburn. The Aces beat the Panthers 90–83 to earn their first win as an NCAA Division I team. Taylor scored a game-high 25 points followed by Miller with 21 points. Watson attributed the victory to an improvement in aggressiveness including rebounding; the 34–32 count was the first time the Aces had out-rebounded an opponent during the season.

On December 10, the Aces faced their first ranked opponent in an away game against the 5–0 Indiana State Sycamores who were led by Larry Bird. Watson kept the same starting line-up as in their Pittsburgh victory with Duff, Taylor and Washington being given turns at guarding Bird. The Aces were blown out 76–102 by the Sycamores with Bird scoring 35 points. Duff scored 23 points before he fouled out late in the second half; Watson said, "I think in two years Duff will be as good as Bird and I don't give guys very many accolades." Taylor sprained his ankle during the game and was considered unlikely to start when the Aces played on the road against the Middle Tennessee Blue Raiders on December 14. Watson planned to insert Alston, who had scored 17 points off the bench against the Sycamores, into the starting line-up in Taylor's place.

== Plane crash ==
On December 13, 1977, Watson, all 14 members of the varsity team and some members of the staff were killed in the Air Indiana Flight 216 crash. The Purple Aces had been travelling to Nashville, Tennessee, to play the Middle Tennessee Blue Raiders when the plane crashed shortly after takeoff from the Evansville Regional Airport and killed all passengers on board. Also killed in the crash were Bob Hudson, assistant athletic director and ticket manager; Charles Shike, comptroller; Greg Knipping, sports information director; Marv Bates, Evansville radio sportscaster; Mark Kniese, team trainer; and Jeff Bohnert and Mark Kirkpatrick, team student managers. Watson was the only coach on the flight as assistant coaches Sandy, Stephenson and Simpson were on scouting assignments.

The only Purple Aces player who was not on the flight, freshman David Furr, was killed in a car accident two weeks later.

== Roster ==
1977–78 Evansville Purple Aces men's basketball team
Players
Coaches

Pos.	#	Name	Height	Weight	Year	Previous school	Hometown
G		Warren Alston	6 ft 4 in (1.93 m)	—	Fr	Goldsboro HS	Goldsboro, NC
F		Ray Comandella	6 ft 9 in (2.06 m)	—	Fr	Munster HS	Munster, IN
F		Mike Duff	6 ft 7 in (2.01 m)	—	Fr	Eldorado HS	Eldorado, IL
		David Furr (redshirt)	—	—	Fr	East Richland HS	Olney, IL
G		Kraig Heckendorn	6 ft 1 in (1.85 m)	—	Fr	Oak Hills HS	Cincinnati, OH
G		Mike Joyner	6 ft 3 in (1.91 m)	—	Fr	Terre Haute South HS	Terre Haute, IN
G		Kevin Kingston	6 ft 2 in (1.88 m)	—	Sr	John A. Logan	Eldorado, IL
F		Barney Lewis	6 ft 7 in (2.01 m)	—	Fr	Goldsboro HS	Goldsboro, NC
C		Steve Miller	6 ft 8 in (2.03 m)	—	Jr	New Albany HS	New Albany, IN
C		Keith Moon	6 ft 8 in (2.03 m)	—	So	Fairmont West HS	Kettering, OH
F		Mark Siegel	6 ft 1 in (1.85 m)	—	Fr	Pike HS	Indianapolis, IN
G		Greg Smith (W)	6 ft 0 in (1.83 m)	—	Fr	Frankfort Community HS	West Frankfort, IL
F		Bryan Taylor	6 ft 5 in (1.96 m)	—	Jr	Louisville	Tell City, IN
G		John Ed Washington	6 ft 3 in (1.91 m)	—	Sr	Arsenal Tech HS	Indianapolis, IN
G		Tony Winburn	5 ft 8 in (1.73 m)	—	Sr	IUS	Jeffersonville, IN

Head coach

- Bobby Watson (VMI)

Assistant coach(es)

- Mark Sandy (Ferrum)
- Ernon Simpson (Kentucky Wesleyan)
- Stafford Stephenson (Emory & Henry)

Legend

- (C) Team captain
- (S) Suspended
- (I) Ineligible
- (W) Walk-on
- Injured
- Current redshirt

Roster

== Schedule and results ==
Date time, TV	Rank^{#}	Opponent^{#}	Result	Record	Site city, state
Non-conference regular season
Nov 30, 1977*		Western Kentucky	L 72–82	0–1	Roberts Municipal Stadium; Evansville, IN
Dec 3, 1977*		at DePaul	L 71–94	0–2	Alumni Hall; Chicago, IL
Dec 6, 1977*		Pittsburgh	W 90–83	1–2	Roberts Municipal Stadium; Evansville, IN
Dec 10, 1977*		at No. 11 Indiana State	L 76–102	1–3	Hulman Center; Terre Haute, IN
*Non-conference game. ^{#}Rankings from AP Poll. (#) Tournament seedings in parentheses.

== Player statistics ==
Player	GP	FGPG	FGAPG	FG%	FTPG	FTAPG	FT%	RPG	PFPG	PPG
Warren Alston	4	4.0	8.8	.457	2.3	3.3	.692	1.5	1.3	10.3
Ray Comandella	1	.0	.0	–	.0	.0	–	.0	1.0	.0
Mike Duff	4	8.5	18.5	.459	3.3	5.3	.619	9.5	4.5	20.3
Kraig Heckendorn	4	.5	1.5	.333	1.0	1.5	.667	.0	2.0	2.0
Mike Joyner	2	1.5	3.0	.500	.0	.0	–	.0	.0	3.0
Kevin Kingston	4	.3	1.0	.250	.0	.3	.000	.5	1.3	.5
Barney Lewis	4	.5	1.3	.400	.0	.3	.000	.5	.0	1.0
Steve Miller	4	4.0	9.0	.444	5.3	7.0	.750	7.0	3.3	13.3
Keith Moon	4	.3	1.8	.143	.5	.5	1.000	1.0	1.5	1.0
Mark Siegel	4	.8	2.5	.300	.0	.0	–	1.8	1.8	1.5
Greg Smith	1	.0	.0	–	.0	.0	–	.0	.0	.0
Bryan Taylor	4	7.5	13.0	.577	3.3	4.5	.722	5.3	2.3	18.3
John Ed Washington	4	3.8	13.0	.288	.3	.3	1.000	5.3	3.3	7.8
Tony Winburn	4	.0	.3	.000	.0	.3	.000	1.0	1.0	.0
Team Totals	4	30.8	72.0	.427	15.8	23.0	.685	41.5	22.3	77.3
