= Catholic University Cardinals men's basketball =

- University: The Catholic University of America
- Head coach: Aaron Kelly (1st season)
- Location: Washington, D.C.
- Arena: Raymond A. DuFour Athletic Center
- Conference: Landmark Conference; III Division
- Nickname: Cardinals
- Colors: Cardinal red and black

NCAA Division I tournament appearances
- Division I: 1944; Division II: 1964; Division III: 1993, 1996, 1998, 1999, 2000, 2001, 2002, 2003, 2004, 2006, 2007, 2013, 2015, 2016, 2024, 2025, 2026

NCAA Division III tournament champions
- 2001
Other NCAA Division III tournament results
Final Four	2001
Elite Eight	2000, 2001, 2025
Sweet Sixteen	1998, 1999, 2000, 2001, 2002, 2025

The Catholic University Cardinals men's basketball team represents The Catholic University of America in the National Collegiate Athletic Association (NCAA) Division III college basketball competition as a member of the Landmark Conference. They won the national championship in the 2000–2001 season, and are the only program in Division III to reach the Sweet Sixteen in five consecutive seasons, from 1998 to 2002.

== History ==
The team began as a club sport in the 1909–10 season, and gained varsity status the following year. Although it did not have an official head coach, the roster listed Joseph Bollin as the team's "manager." The first game during the club sport era was against Georgetown University, and the first official game was a 42–33 home victory over Gallaudet University on January 7, 1911. They followed it with a 37–34 victory over St. John's College in Annapolis, but lost the remaining six games of the season to finish 2–6.

Fred Rice, a graduate student, joined the team in the 1911–12 season as a player coach. Rice had previously played at Georgetown, where he earned a law degree. The team improved to 10–7, and then 13–3 in 1912–13.

The December 1916 edition of The Catholic University of America Bulletin declared that, under Rice's leadership,

Our three latest seasons have been records of accomplishment and victory. Schools of much greater prominence have been conquered, and even the acknowledged college champions of the North have bowed in defeat to us. The fastest Southern teams have been unable to best us, and, as a result, the South Atlantic Championship has been awarded to us two times.

The Brookland Gymnasium, the first on-campus arena, opened in 1924. The team won its first two games in it, and went 38–15 from 1925 to 1928.

== NCAA tournament results ==
The 1943–44 men's basketball team won the Mason-Dixon Conference title and made the program's first trip to the NCAA tournament. The team played in Madison Square Garden, losing to Dartmouth and Temple.

Cardinals' NCAA D-I Tournament history
Year	Opponent	Won/Lost	Result
1944
1944	Dartmouth College	L	38–63
1944	Temple University	L	35–55

In the 1963–64 season, Catholic played the NCAA College Division (Division II) Tournament at Hofstra, losing to Hofstra and Philadelphia.

Cardinals' NCAA D-II (College Division) Tournament history
Year	Opponent	Won/Lost	Result
1964
1964	Hofstra University	L	91–92 (2OT)
1964	Philadelphia Textile	L	64–94

The men's basketball team won the 2001 NCAA Division III National Championship and was the only program in Division III to reach the Sweet Sixteen in five consecutive seasons, from 1998 to 2002. They also reached the postseason in 1993, 1996, 2003, 2004, 2006, 2007, 2013, 2015, 2016, and 2024.

Cardinals' NCAA D-III Tournament history
Year	Round	Opponent	Won/Lost	Result
1993	1st	Stockton State College	L	91–106
1996	1st	Cabrini College	L	65–85
1998
1998	2nd	Johns Hopkins University	W	67–62
1998	Sectional Semifinals	Hunter College	L	82–84 (2 OT)
1999
1999	1st	Lebanon Valley College	W	77–72
1999	2nd	Goucher College	W	73–69
1999	Sectional Semifinals	William Paterson University	L	71–79
2000
2000	2nd	Christopher Newport University	W	65–64
2000	Sectional Semifinals	William Paterson University	W	57–52
2000	Sectional Finals	Franklin & Marshall College	L	74–85
2001
2001	1st	City College of New York	W	82–65
2001	2nd	Widener University	W	69–67
2001	Sectional Semifinals	State University of New York at Brockport	W	69–64
2001	Sectional Finals	Clark University	W	82–78
2001	National Semifinals	Ohio Northern University	W	82–76
2001	Championship	William Paterson University	W	76–62
2002
2002	2nd	Hampden–Sydney College	W	74–66
2002	Sectional Semifinals	Clark University	L	72–75
2003	2nd	Montclair State University	L	78–95
2004
2004	1st	SUNY-Old Westbury	W	75–50
2004	2nd	Gwynedd–Mercy College	L	72–74 (OT)
2006	1st	Widener University	L	59–61
2007
2007	1st	Messiah College	W	37–58
2007	2nd	Lincoln University	L	70–81
2013
2013	1st	College of Staten Island	W	67–61
2013	2nd	Williams College	L	78–89
2015
2015	1st	Alvernia University	W	87–80
2015	2nd	Randolph–Macon College	L	65–78
2016	1st	Endicott College	L	76–84
2024
2024	1st	Worcester State University	W	75-72 (OT)
2024	2nd	Rowan University	L	85–89
2025
2025	1st	Franklin & Marshall	W	84-50
2025	2nd	Randolph–Macon	W	79-67
2025	Sectional Semifinals	Roanoke	W	95-91 (OT)
2025	Sectional Finals	Trinity	L	86-63

== Coaches ==
Cardinals' Coaches
Years	Coach
1911 – 1930	Fred Rice
1931 – 1941	Forrest Cotton
1943 – 1944	John Long
1952 – 1957	Joe Della Ratta
1958 – 1967	Tom Young
	Bob Reese
1972 – 1975	Dick Myers
1975 – 1982	Jack Kvancz
1983 – 1989	Jack Bruen
1990 – 1991	Bob Valvano
1992 – 2003	Mike Lonergan
2004 – 2019	Steve Howes
2019 – present	Aaron Kelly
