= Louisiana–Monroe Warhawks men's basketball =

Collegiate men's basketball program

ULM Warhawks men's basketball
2026–27 Louisiana–Monroe Warhawks men's basketball team
- University: University of Louisiana at Monroe
- First season: 1951–52; 75 years ago
- Head coach: Ryan Cross; 1st season, 0–0 (–)
- Location: Monroe, Louisiana
- Arena: Fant–Ewing Coliseum (capacity: 7,000)
- Conference: Sun Belt Conference
- Nickname: Warhawks
- Colors: Maroon and gold

NCAA Division I tournament appearances
- 1982, 1986, 1990, 1991, 1992, 1993, 1996

Conference tournament champions
- 1979, 1982, 1986, 1990, 1991, 1992, 1993, 1996

Conference regular-season champions
- 1962, 1965, 1980, 1986, 1990, 1991, 1993, 1994, 1996, 1997

Conference division champions
- 2007

Uniforms
Home	Away

For information on all University of Louisiana at Monroe sports, see Louisiana–Monroe Warhawks

The ULM Warhawks men's basketball (formerly the Northeast Louisiana Indians) program represents intercollegiate men's basketball at the University of Louisiana at Monroe. The school competes in the Sun Belt Conference in Division I of the National Collegiate Athletic Association (NCAA). They are currently led by first-year head coach Ryan Cross and play home games at the Fant–Ewing Coliseum in Monroe, Louisiana. The Warhawks have appeared in the NCAA tournament seven times, most recently in 1996.

== History ==
=== Conference membership history ===
- 1951–1971: Gulf States Conference
- 1971–1978: Independent
- 1978–1982: Atlantic Sun Conference
- 1982–2006: Southland Conference
- 2006–present: Sun Belt Conference

=== Coaches ===
Years	Coach	Record
1951–1953	Cary Phillips	8–33
1953–1957	Arnold Kilpatrick	58–52
1957–1979	Lenny Fant	326–221
1979–1981	Benny Hollis	33–23
1981–2005	Mike Vining	402–302
2006–2010	Orlando Early	60–92
2010–2025	Keith Richard	170–296
2025–2026	Phil Cunningham	4–28
2026–present	Ryan Cross	0–0

== All-time conference record ==
Conference	Seasons	Record
Gulf States	18	100–98
Atlantic Sun	4	23–11
Southland	24	235–145
Sun Belt	18	118–210

== Postseason results ==
=== NCAA tournament results ===
The Warhawks have appeared in the NCAA tournament seven times. Their combined record is 0–7.

Year	Seed	Round	Opponent	Result
1982	11	First round	(6) Iowa	L 63–70
1986	13	First round	(4) UNLV	L 51–74
1990	15	First round	(2) Purdue	L 63–75
1991	15	First round	(2) Duke	L 73–102
1992	15	First round	(2) USC	L 54–84
1993	13	First round	(4) Iowa	L 69–82
1996	15	First round	(2) Wake Forest	L 50–62

=== NAIA tournament results ===
The Warhawks have appeared in the NAIA tournament one time. Their record is 1–1.

Year	Round	Opponent	Result
1970	First round Second Round	Linfield; Jackson State	W 78–72; L 83–90

=== NIT results ===
The Warhawks have appeared in the National Invitation Tournament (NIT) two times. Their combined record is 0–2.

Year	Round	Opponent	Result
1979	First round	Virginia	L 78–79
1988	First round	Arkansas State	L 54–70

=== CBI results ===
The Warhawks have appeared in the College Basketball Invitational (CBI) one time. Their record is 3–2.

Year	Round	Opponent	Result
2015	First round Quarterfinals; Semi-finals; Finals Game 1 Finals Game 2	Eastern Michigan; Mercer; Vermont; Loyola–Chicago; Loyola–Chicago	W 71–67; W 71–69; W 71–65; L 58–65; L 62–63

=== CIT results ===
The Warhawks have appeared in the CollegeInsider.com Postseason Tournament (CIT) three times. Their combined record is 1–3.

Year	Round	Opponent	Result
2016	First round	Furman	L 57–58
2018	First round	Austin Peay	L 66–80
2019	First round Quarterfinals	Kent State; Texas Southern	W 87–77; L 102–108 ^{3OT}

== See also ==
- List of NCAA Division I men's basketball programs
