= 1974–75 Marquette Warriors men's basketball team =

American college basketball season

1974–75 Marquette Warriors men's basketball

NCAA Men's Division I Tournament, First round
- Conference: Independent

Ranking
- Coaches: No. 6
- AP: No. 11
- Record: 23–4
- Head coach: Al McGuire
- Home arena: MECCA Arena

1974–75 NCAA Division I men's basketball independents standings
	Conf.				Overall
Team	W		L	PCT	W		L	PCT
Texas–Pan American		–		–	22	–	2	.917
UNC Charlotte		–		–	23	–	3	.885
Centenary (LA)		–		–	25	–	4	.862
No. 11 Marquette		–		–	23	–	4	.852
Stetson		–		–	22	–	4	.846
No. 13 Cincinnati		–		–	23	–	6	.793
Utah State		–		–	21	–	6	.778
Rutgers		–		–	22	–	7	.759
Creighton		–		–	20	–	7	.741
Memphis State		–		–	20	–	7	.741
South Alabama		–		–	19	–	7	.731
No. 6 Syracuse		–		–	23	–	9	.719
Holy Cross		–		–	20	–	8	.714
Oral Roberts		–		–	20	–	8	.714
Boston College		–		–	21	–	9	.700
Florida State		–		–	18	–	8	.692
Portland State		–		–	18	–	8	.692
UC Santa Barbara		–		–	18	–	8	.692
VCU		–		–	17	–	8	.680
South Carolina		–		–	19	–	9	.679
St. John's		–		–	21	–	10	.677
Southern Illinois		–		–	18	–	9	.667
No. 14 Notre Dame		–		–	19	–	10	.655
Detroit		–		–	17	–	9	.654
No. 20 Providence		–		–	20	–	11	.645
Georgetown		–		–	18	–	10	.643
George Washington		–		–	17	–	10	.630
Pittsburgh		–		–	18	–	11	.621
Houston		–		–	16	–	10	.615
Illinois State		–		–	16	–	10	.615
Tulane		–		–	16	–	10	.615
Virginia Tech		–		–	16	–	10	.615
Canisius		–		–	15	–	10	.600
DePaul		–		–	15	–	10	.600
Northeast Louisiana		–		–	15	–	10	.600
South Florida		–		–	15	–	10	.600
Seton Hall		–		–	16	–	11	.593
Jacksonville		–		–	15	–	11	.577
Duquesne		–		–	14	–	11	.560
Hawaii		–		–	14	–	11	.560
Saint Peter's		–		–	15	–	12	.556
Cleveland State		–		–	13	–	11	.542
Manhattan		–		–	14	–	12	.538
Air Force		–		–	13	–	12	.520
LIU		–		–	13	–	12	.520
St. Bonaventure		–		–	14	–	13	.519
West Virginia		–		–	14	–	13	.519
Cal State Los Angeles		–		–	13	–	13	.500
Marshall		–		–	13	–	13	.500
Navy		–		–	12	–	12	.500
Northeastern		–		–	12	–	12	.500
Fairfield		–		–	13	–	14	.481
Niagara		–		–	13	–	14	.481
Fordham		–		–	12	–	13	.480
Penn State		–		–	11	–	12	.478
Indiana State		–		–	12	–	14	.462
Oklahoma City		–		–	12	–	14	.462
Saint Louis		–		–	12	–	14	.462
Fairleigh Dickinson		–		–	11	–	13	.458
Portland		–		–	13	–	16	.448
Saint Francis (PA)		–		–	11	–	14	.440
Georgia Tech		–		–	11	–	15	.423
Southern Miss		–		–	11	–	15	.423
Xavier		–		–	11	–	15	.423
Ball State		–		–	10	–	15	.400
Loyola-Chicago		–		–	10	–	15	.400
Butler		–		–	10	–	16	.385
Dayton		–		–	10	–	16	.385
Denver		–		–	9	–	16	.360
Northern Illinois		–		–	8	–	15	.348
Houston Baptist		–		–	9	–	17	.346
Mercer		–		–	9	–	17	.346
Samford		–		–	9	–	17	.346
Colgate		–		–	8	–	16	.333
Villanova		–		–	9	–	18	.333
Buffalo		–		–	8	–	17	.320
Georgia Southern		–		–	8	–	18	.308
Georgia State		–		–	8	–	18	.308
Wisconsin-Milwaukee		–		–	8	–	18	.308
St. Francis (NY)		–		–	7	–	19	.269
Baptist		–		–	4	–	16	.200
Hardin-Simmons		–		–	5	–	20	.200
Iona		–		–	4	–	19	.174
Army		–		–	3	–	22	.120
Rankings from AP Poll

The 1974–75 Marquette Warriors men's basketball team represented Marquette University in NCAA Division I men's competition in the 1974–75 academic year. They received the conference's automatic bid to the NCAA Tournament where they lost in the first round to Kentucky.

== Roster ==
1974–75 Marquette Warriors men's basketball team
Players
Coaches

Pos.	#	Name	Height	Weight	Year	Hometown
G	10	Barry Brennan	5 ft 10 in (1.78 m)	150 lb (68 kg)	Jr	Charlotte, North Carolina
C	30	Craig Butrym	6 ft 11 in (2.11 m)	185 lb (84 kg)	So	Fox Point, Wisconsin
G	53	Rick Campbell	6 ft 5 in (1.96 m)	190 lb (86 kg)	Sr	Chicago, Illinois
G	23	Dave Delsman	5 ft 10 in (1.78 m)	160 lb (73 kg)	Sr	Waukesha, Wisconsin
F	31	Bo Ellis	6 ft 9 in (2.06 m)	190 lb (86 kg)	So	Chicago, Illinois
F/C	45	Jerry Homan	6 ft 7 in (2.01 m)	205 lb (93 kg)	Sr	Wauwatosa, Wisconsin
F	51	Greg Johnson	6 ft 5 in (1.96 m)	175 lb (79 kg)	Jr	Milwaukee, Wisconsin
G	15	Butch Lee	6 ft 1 in (1.85 m)	185 lb (84 kg)	Fr	The Bronx, New York
F	42	Bill Neary	6 ft 5 in (1.96 m)	185 lb (84 kg)	So	Wauwatosa, Wisconsin
G	55	Gary Rosenberger	6 ft 0 in (1.83 m)	155 lb (70 kg)	Fr	Milwaukee, Wisconsin
G	43	Earl Tatum	6 ft 5 in (1.96 m)	185 lb (84 kg)	Jr	Mount Vernon, New York
F	40	Paul Vollmer	6 ft 4 in (1.93 m)	180 lb (82 kg)	Sr	Wauwatosa, Wisconsin
G	22	Lloyd Walton	6 ft 0 in (1.83 m)	160 lb (73 kg)	Jr	Chicago, Illinois

Head coach

- Al McGuire

Assistant coach(es)

- Hank Raymonds
- Rick Majerus

Legend

- (C) Team captain
- (S) Suspended
- (I) Ineligible
- (W) Walk-on
- Injured
- Current redshirt

== Schedule ==
Date time, TV	Rank^{#}	Opponent^{#}	Result	Record	Site city, state
December 3		St. John's (MN)	W 92–46	1–0	MECCA Arena; Milwaukee, WI
December 7		Saint Mary's (CA)	W 93–66	2–0	MECCA Arena; Milwaukee, WI
December 14		Toledo	W 64–61	3–0	MECCA Arena; Milwaukee, WI
December 18		at Pittsburgh	L 58–65	3–1	Fitzgerald Field House; Pittsburgh, Pennsylvania
December 21		Louisville	L 69–80	3–2	MECCA Arena; Milwaukee, WI
December 27		Georgia	W 100–70	4–2	MECCA Arena; Milwaukee, WI
December 28		Virginia	W 73–55	5–2	MECCA Arena; Milwaukee, WI
January 3		DePaul	W 61–60	6–2	MECCA Arena; Milwaukee, WI
January 6		at San Diego State	W 58–54	7–2	Peterson Gym; San Diego, California
January 8		at Portland	W 87–57	8–2	Howard Hall; Portland, Oregon
January 11		Manhattan	W 66–62	9–2	MECCA Arena; Milwaukee, WI
January 14		South Carolina	W 69–60	10–2	MECCA Arena; Milwaukee, WI
January 18		Notre Dame	W 71–68	11–2	MECCA Arena; Milwaukee, WI
January 21		Cincinnati	L 58–68	11–3	MECCA Arena; Milwaukee, WI
January 29		at Xavier	W 73–55	12–3	Cincinnati Gardens; Cincinnati, Ohio
February 1		at DePaul	W 72–69	13–3	Alumni Hall; Chicago, Illinois
February 4		at Wisconsin	W 69–63	14–3	Wisconsin Field House; Madison, Wisconsin
February 8		Xavier	W 78–55	15–3	MECCA Arena; Milwaukee, WI
February 11		Western Carolina	W 63–53	16–3	MECCA Arena; Milwaukee, WI
February 15		Detroit	W 81–62	17–3	MECCA Arena; Milwaukee, WI
February 17		at Butler	W 77–55	18–3	Hinkle Fieldhouse; Indianapolis, Indiana
February 20		at Fordham	W 101–64	19–3	Rose Hill Gym; Bronx, NY
February 22		at South Carolina	W 68–65	20–3	Carolina Coliseum; Columbia, SC
March 1		Oklahoma City	W 86–65	21–3	MECCA Arena; Milwaukee, WI
March 8		at Creighton	W 64–60	22–3	Omaha Civic Auditorium; Omaha, Nebraska
March 10		at Tulane	W 73–65	23–3	Avron B. Fogelman Arena; New Orleans, Louisiana
March 15		vs. Kentucky; NCAA Tournament First Round	L 54–76	23–4	Coleman Coliseum; Tuscaloosa, Alabama
*Non-conference game. ^{#}Rankings from AP Poll. (#) Tournament seedings in parentheses.
