= 1975 NCAA Division I basketball tournament =

Edition of USA college basketball tournament

- NCAA logo from 1971 to 1979
- Season: 1974–75
- Teams: 32
- Finals site: San Diego Sports Arena, San Diego, California
- Champions: UCLA Bruins (10th title, 10th title game, 12th Final Four)
- Runner-up: Kentucky Wildcats (6th title game, 7th Final Four)
- Semifinalists: Louisville Cardinals (3rd Final Four); Syracuse Orangemen (1st Final Four)
- Winning coach: John Wooden (10th title)
- MOP: Richard Washington (UCLA)
- Attendance: 183,857
- Top scorer: Jim Lee (Syracuse) (119 points)

The 1975 NCAA Division I basketball tournament involved 32 schools playing in single-elimination play to determine the national champion of men's NCAA Division I college basketball. The 37th annual edition of the tournament began on March 15, 1975, and ended with the championship game on March 31, at the San Diego Sports Arena, now known as Pechanga Arena San Diego, in San Diego, California. A total of 36 games were played, including a third-place game in each region and a national third-place game. This was the first 32-team tournament.

UCLA, coached by John Wooden, won his 10th and last national title with a 92–85 victory in the final game over Kentucky, coached by Joe B. Hall. Richard Washington of UCLA was named the tournament's Most Outstanding Player.

The Bruins again had an advantage by playing the Final Four in their home state. It was the last time a team won the national championship playing in its home state.

== Tournament notes ==
- The bracket expanded to 32 teams; the previous six editions had 25 teams, and had varied between 22 and 25 from 1953 through 1974.
- With the expanded bracket, seven teams made their NCAA tournament debuts: Alabama, Central Michigan, Middle Tennessee, Montana, UNLV, Rutgers, and San Diego State. This was the most new teams since a then-record eleven new teams made the 25-team bracket in 1956.
- Alabama had previously won the Southeastern Conference in 1956, but were deemed ineligible for the tournament due to their entire starting lineup having played as freshmen, which was not allowed at the time. They had also tied Vanderbilt for the 1974 SEC title, but lost the bid because Vanderbilt was ranked higher.
- It was the last time until 2021 that Oregon State officially won an NCAA tournament game. (The Beavers won two tournament games in 1982, but those were later vacated by the NCAA.) Of the major conferences, only Nebraska, which, until March 19, 2026, had never won an NCAA tournament game, had a longer active winning drought.
- This was the last tournament in which third-place games were contested in each regional; the national third-place game continued through 1981.
- This was also the first NCAA tournament to allow more than one team per conference; previously, only one team from each conference was allowed. This change was in response to a number of factors:
  - The USC Trojans were ranked fifth in both major polls in 1971, their only two losses were to Pac-8 rival and top-ranked UCLA (the defending and eventual national champion), but were excluded from the 25-team NCAA tournament due to being runner-up in the conference.
  - The 1974 ACC tournament final pitted two of the three best teams in the country: North Carolina State and Maryland.
  - In 1974, the Collegiate Commissioners' Association held a tournament in St. Louis, Missouri. They invited the second-place teams from eight conferences to participate.
- The new selection criteria threatened to exclude Northeastern teams, which did not belong to conferences. To address this problem, this was the first NCAA Tournament to grant automatic bids to the winners of ECAC regional tournaments for Northeastern Division I independents organized by the Eastern College Athletic Conference, a loose sports federation of Northeastern colleges and universities; this practice continued through 1982.
- Finally, the national final was the last game for UCLA coaching legend John Wooden, who had announced his retirement at the press conference following the Saturday semifinal win over Louisville. Two days later, he won his tenth and final NCAA championship.
- Bob Wortman became the first person to officiate championship games in college basketball and the National Football League when he worked the UCLA-Kentucky final alongside Naismith Memorial Hall of Fame referee Hank Nichols. Wortman was the field judge for Super Bowl VI in January 1972, and later for Super Bowl XII at the same position.
  - The UCLA-Kentucky matchup was the first of six championship games officiated by Nichols (1979, '80, 82, '83, '86), who later became the NCAA's national coordinator of officiating.

== Memorable games ==
There were two memorable games in the 1975 tournament. Number 2 ranked Kentucky upset previously unbeaten Indiana 92–90 in their regional final. The Hoosiers, coached by Bob Knight, were undefeated and the number one team in the nation, when leading scorer Scott May suffered a broken arm in a win over arch-rival Purdue. This was the only loss Indiana would suffer between March 1974 and December 1976. In the national semifinals, UCLA defeated Louisville, coached by former Wooden assistant Denny Crum, 75–74 in overtime, rallying late in regulation to force overtime and coming from behind in overtime to win on a last second shot by Richard Washington.

Both games made USA Today's 2002 list of the greatest NCAA tournament games of all time, with the former at #8 and the latter at #28.

== Schedule and venues ==
The following are the sites that were selected to host each round of the 1975 tournament:

First round

- March 15
  - East Region
    - Charlotte Coliseum, Charlotte, North Carolina (Host: University of North Carolina at Charlotte)
    - The Palestra, Philadelphia, Pennsylvania (Hosts: University of Pennsylvania, Ivy League)
  - Mideast Region
    - Memorial Coliseum, Lexington, Kentucky (Host: University of Kentucky)
    - Memorial Coliseum, Tuscaloosa, Alabama (Host: University of Alabama at Tuscaloosa)
  - Midwest Region
    - Lubbock Municipal Coliseum, Lubbock, Texas (Host: Texas Tech University)
    - Mabee Center, Tulsa, Oklahoma (Host: Oral Roberts University)
  - West Region
    - WSU Performing Arts Coliseum, Pullman, Washington (Host: Washington State University)
    - ASU Activity Center, Tempe, Arizona (Host: Arizona State University)

Regional semifinals and finals (Sweet Sixteen and Elite Eight)

- March 20 and 22
  - East Regional, Providence Civic Center, Providence, Rhode Island (Host: Providence College)
  - Mideast Regional, University of Dayton Arena, Dayton, Ohio (Host: University of Dayton)
  - Midwest Regional, Pan American Center, Las Cruces, New Mexico (Host: New Mexico State University)
  - West Regional, Memorial Coliseum, Portland, Oregon (Host: University of Portland)

National semifinals, 3rd-place game, and championship (Final Four and championship)

- March 29 and 31
  - San Diego Sports Arena, San Diego, California (Host: San Diego State University)

== Teams ==
Region	Team	Coach	Conference	Finished	Final Opponent	Score
East
East	Boston College	Bob Zuffelato	Independent	Regional Fourth Place	North Carolina	L 110–90
East	Furman	Joe Williams	Southern	Round of 32	Boston College	L 82–76
East	Kansas State	Jack Hartman	Big Eight	Regional Runner-up	Syracuse	L 95–87
East	La Salle	Paul Westhead	East Coast	Round of 32	Syracuse	L 87–83
East	New Mexico State	Lou Henson	Missouri Valley	Round of 32	North Carolina	L 93–69
East	North Carolina	Dean Smith	Atlantic Coast	Regional third place	Boston College	W 110–90
East	Penn	Chuck Daly	Ivy League	Round of 32	Kansas State	L 69–62
East	Syracuse	Roy Danforth	Independent	Fourth Place	Louisville	L 96–88
Mideast
Mideast	Central Michigan	Dick Parfitt	Mid-American	Regional third place	Oregon State	W 88–87
Mideast	Georgetown	John Thompson	Independent	Round of 32	Central Michigan	L 77–75
Mideast	Indiana	Bob Knight	Big Ten	Regional Runner-up	Kentucky	L 92–90
Mideast	Kentucky	Joe B. Hall	Southeastern	Runner-up	UCLA	L 92–85
Mideast	Marquette	Al McGuire	Independent	Round of 32	Kentucky	L 76–54
Mideast	Middle Tennessee State	Jimmy Earle	Ohio Valley	Round of 32	Oregon State	L 78–67
Mideast	Oregon State	Ralph Miller	Pacific-8	Regional Fourth Place	Central Michigan	L 88–87
Mideast	UTEP	Don Haskins	Western Athletic	Round of 32	Indiana	L 78–53
Midwest
Midwest	Cincinnati	Gale Catlett	Independent	Regional third place	Notre Dame	W 95–87
Midwest	Creighton	Tom Apke	Independent	Round of 32	Maryland	L 83–79
Midwest	Kansas	Ted Owens	Big Eight	Round of 32	Notre Dame	L 77–71
Midwest	Louisville	Denny Crum	Missouri Valley	Third Place	Syracuse	W 96–88
Midwest	Maryland	Lefty Driesell	Atlantic Coast	Regional Runner-up	Louisville	L 96–82
Midwest	Notre Dame	Digger Phelps	Independent	Regional Fourth Place	Cincinnati	L 95–87
Midwest	Rutgers	Tom Young	Independent	Round of 32	Louisville	L 91–78
Midwest	Texas A&M	Shelby Metcalf	Southwest	Round of 32	Cincinnati	L 87–79
West
West	Alabama	C. M. Newton	Southeastern	Round of 32	Arizona State	L 97–94
West	Arizona State	Ned Wulk	Western Athletic	Regional Runner-up	UCLA	L 89–75
West	Michigan	Johnny Orr	Big Ten	Round of 32	UCLA	L 103–91
West	Montana	Jud Heathcote	Big Sky	Regional Fourth Place	UNLV	L 75–67
West	UNLV	Jerry Tarkanian	West Coast	Regional third place	Montana	W 75–67
West	San Diego State	Tim Vezie	Pacific Coast	Round of 32	UNLV	L 90–80
West	UCLA	John Wooden	Pacific-8	Champion	Kentucky	W 92–85
West	Utah State	Dutch Belnap	Independent	Round of 32	Montana	L 69–63

== Bracket ==
* – Denotes overtime period

=== East region ===
Quarterfinals
Syracuse	87
La Salle	83*
North Carolina	93
New Mexico State	69
Kansas State	69
Penn	62
Boston College	82
Furman	76

Semifinals
Syracuse	78
North Carolina	76
Kansas State	74
Boston College	65

Finals
Syracuse	95
Kansas State	87*
East Regional third place
North Carolina	110
Boston College	90

=== Mideast region ===
Quarterfinals
Indiana	78
UTEP	53
Oregon State	78
Middle Tennessee	67
Central Michigan	77
Georgetown	75
Kentucky	76
Marquette	54

Semifinals
Indiana	81
Oregon State	71
Central Michigan	73
Kentucky	90

Finals
Indiana	90
Kentucky	92
Mideast Regional third place
Oregon State	87
Central Michigan	88

=== Midwest region ===
Quarterfinals
Maryland	83
Creighton	79
Notre Dame	77
Kansas	71
Cincinnati	87
Texas A&M	79
Louisville	91
Rutgers	78

Semifinals
Maryland	83
Notre Dame	71
Cincinnati	63
Louisville	78

Finals
Maryland	82
Louisville	96
Midwest Regional third place
Notre Dame	87
Cincinnati	95

=== West region ===
Quarterfinals
UCLA	103
Michigan	91*
Montana	69
Utah State	63
Arizona State	97
Alabama	94
UNLV	90
San Diego State	80

Semifinals
UCLA	67
Montana	64
Arizona State	84
UNLV	81

Finals
UCLA	89
Arizona State	75
West Regional third place
Montana	67
UNLV	75

=== Final Four ===
National semifinals Saturday, March 29
E	Syracuse	79
ME	Kentucky	95
MW	Louisville	74*
W	UCLA	75

National Championship Game; Monday, March 31
ME	Kentucky	85
W	UCLA	92
National third-place game
E	Syracuse	88*
MW	Louisville	96

== Announcers ==
Curt Gowdy, Billy Packer, Jim Simpson and Jerry Lucas (Final Four only) - First Round at Tuscaloosa, Alabama (Marquette-Kentucky); West Regional Final at Portland, Oregon; Final Four in San Diego, California

- Jim Simpson and Tom Hawkins - First Round at Tempe, Arizona (Arizona State-Alabama); East Regional Final at Providence, Rhode Island
- Charlie Jones and Jerry Lucas - First Round at Lexington, Kentucky (Indiana-UTEP)
- Marv Albert and Jerry Lucas - Mideast Regional Final at Dayton, Ohio
- Jay Randolph and Ross Porter - Midwest Regional Final at Las Cruces, New Mexico

== See also ==
- 1975 NCAA Division II basketball tournament
- 1975 NCAA Division III basketball tournament
- 1975 National Invitation Tournament
- 1975 NAIA Division I men's basketball tournament
- 1975 National Women's Invitation Tournament
