= 1974–75 St. John's Redmen basketball team =

American college basketball season

1974–75 St. John's Redmen men's basketball

Ocean State Classic Champions

1975 NIT, Fourth Place
- Conference: Independent
- Record: 21–10
- Head coach: Lou Carnesecca
- Assistant coaches: John Kresse; Brian Mahoney
- Captains: Mel Utley; Kevin Cluess
- Home arena: Alumni Hall; Madison Square Garden

1974–75 NCAA Division I men's basketball independents standings
	Conf.				Overall
Team	W		L	PCT	W		L	PCT
Texas–Pan American		–		–	22	–	2	.917
UNC Charlotte		–		–	23	–	3	.885
Centenary (LA)		–		–	25	–	4	.862
No. 11 Marquette		–		–	23	–	4	.852
Stetson		–		–	22	–	4	.846
No. 13 Cincinnati		–		–	23	–	6	.793
Utah State		–		–	21	–	6	.778
Rutgers		–		–	22	–	7	.759
Creighton		–		–	20	–	7	.741
Memphis State		–		–	20	–	7	.741
South Alabama		–		–	19	–	7	.731
No. 6 Syracuse		–		–	23	–	9	.719
Holy Cross		–		–	20	–	8	.714
Oral Roberts		–		–	20	–	8	.714
Boston College		–		–	21	–	9	.700
Florida State		–		–	18	–	8	.692
Portland State		–		–	18	–	8	.692
UC Santa Barbara		–		–	18	–	8	.692
VCU		–		–	17	–	8	.680
South Carolina		–		–	19	–	9	.679
St. John's		–		–	21	–	10	.677
Southern Illinois		–		–	18	–	9	.667
No. 14 Notre Dame		–		–	19	–	10	.655
Detroit		–		–	17	–	9	.654
No. 20 Providence		–		–	20	–	11	.645
Georgetown		–		–	18	–	10	.643
George Washington		–		–	17	–	10	.630
Pittsburgh		–		–	18	–	11	.621
Houston		–		–	16	–	10	.615
Illinois State		–		–	16	–	10	.615
Tulane		–		–	16	–	10	.615
Virginia Tech		–		–	16	–	10	.615
Canisius		–		–	15	–	10	.600
DePaul		–		–	15	–	10	.600
Northeast Louisiana		–		–	15	–	10	.600
South Florida		–		–	15	–	10	.600
Seton Hall		–		–	16	–	11	.593
Jacksonville		–		–	15	–	11	.577
Duquesne		–		–	14	–	11	.560
Hawaii		–		–	14	–	11	.560
Saint Peter's		–		–	15	–	12	.556
Cleveland State		–		–	13	–	11	.542
Manhattan		–		–	14	–	12	.538
Air Force		–		–	13	–	12	.520
LIU		–		–	13	–	12	.520
St. Bonaventure		–		–	14	–	13	.519
West Virginia		–		–	14	–	13	.519
Cal State Los Angeles		–		–	13	–	13	.500
Marshall		–		–	13	–	13	.500
Navy		–		–	12	–	12	.500
Northeastern		–		–	12	–	12	.500
Fairfield		–		–	13	–	14	.481
Niagara		–		–	13	–	14	.481
Fordham		–		–	12	–	13	.480
Penn State		–		–	11	–	12	.478
Indiana State		–		–	12	–	14	.462
Oklahoma City		–		–	12	–	14	.462
Saint Louis		–		–	12	–	14	.462
Fairleigh Dickinson		–		–	11	–	13	.458
Portland		–		–	13	–	16	.448
Saint Francis (PA)		–		–	11	–	14	.440
Georgia Tech		–		–	11	–	15	.423
Southern Miss		–		–	11	–	15	.423
Xavier		–		–	11	–	15	.423
Ball State		–		–	10	–	15	.400
Loyola-Chicago		–		–	10	–	15	.400
Butler		–		–	10	–	16	.385
Dayton		–		–	10	–	16	.385
Denver		–		–	9	–	16	.360
Northern Illinois		–		–	8	–	15	.348
Houston Baptist		–		–	9	–	17	.346
Mercer		–		–	9	–	17	.346
Samford		–		–	9	–	17	.346
Colgate		–		–	8	–	16	.333
Villanova		–		–	9	–	18	.333
Buffalo		–		–	8	–	17	.320
Georgia Southern		–		–	8	–	18	.308
Georgia State		–		–	8	–	18	.308
Wisconsin-Milwaukee		–		–	8	–	18	.308
St. Francis (NY)		–		–	7	–	19	.269
Baptist		–		–	4	–	16	.200
Hardin-Simmons		–		–	5	–	20	.200
Iona		–		–	4	–	19	.174
Army		–		–	3	–	22	.120
Rankings from AP Poll

The 1974–75 St. John's Redmen basketball team represented St. John's University during the 1974–75 NCAA Division I men's basketball season. The team was coached by Lou Carnesecca in his seventh year at the school. St. John's home games are played at Alumni Hall and Madison Square Garden.

== Roster ==
1974–75 St. John's Red Storm men's basketball team
Players
Coaches

Pos.	#	Name	Height	Weight	Year	Previous school	Hometown
G/F	-	Kevelin Winfree (I)	6 ft 5 in (1.96 m)	—	Fr	Alexander Hamilton	Brooklyn, NY
F	-	Cecil Rellford (redshirt)	6 ft 6 in (1.98 m)	—	Jr	Suncoast/Kentucky State	Riviera Beach, FL
G	10	Frank Alagia	5 ft 9 in (1.75 m)	—	Jr	St. Agnes	Rockville Centre, NY
G	12	Bill Clarke	6 ft 2 in (1.88 m)	—	Fr	Archbishop Molloy	Rosedale, NY
G/F	22	Beaver Smith	6 ft 4 in (1.93 m)	—	Jr	South Side	Rockille Centre, NY
F	24	George Johnson	6 ft 7 in (2.01 m)	—	Fr	New Utrecht	Brooklyn, NY
G	30	Mel Utley (C)	6 ft 3 in (1.91 m)	—	Sr	Far Rockaway	Far Rockaway, NY
G/F	32	Glen Williams	6 ft 4 in (1.93 m)	—	So	Laurinburg Prep	St. Thomas, USVI
G	35	Kevin Cluess (C)	6 ft 4 in (1.93 m)	—	Sr	Archbishop Molloy	West Hempstead, NY
G/F	40	Fred McRae	6 ft 5 in (1.96 m)	—	So	John Bowne/Rockwood Prep	Jamaica, NY
F	42	John Farmer	6 ft 5 in (1.96 m)	—	RS Jr	St. John the Baptist/Hofstra	Brentwood, NY
F	44	Ron McGugins	6 ft 6 in (1.98 m)	—	Jr	Blessed Sacrament	Bronx, NY
C	52	Tom Weadock	6 ft 11 in (2.11 m)	—	RS So	Power Memorial/San Jacinto	New York, NY

Head coach

- Lou Carnesecca (St. John's, '50)

Assistant coach(es)

- John Kresse (St. John's, '64)
- Brian Mahoney (Manhattan, '71)

Legend

- (C) Team captain
- (S) Suspended
- (I) Ineligible
- (W) Walk-on
- Injured
- Current redshirt

== Schedule and results ==
Date time, TV	Rank^{#}	Opponent^{#}	Result	Record	Site city, state
Regular season
11/30/74*		Wayne State	W 109-65	1-0	Alumni Hall; Queens, NY
12/02/74*		at Vanderbilt	L 53-63	1-1	Memorial Gymnasium; Nashville, TN
12/07/74*		Temple	W 88-63	2-1	Alumni Hall; Queens, NY
12/10/74*		at Syracuse	L 66-75	2-2	Manley Field House; Syracuse, NY
12/14/74*		Rutgers	L 74-85	2-3	Madison Square Garden; New York, NY
12/21/74*		Boston College	W 75-62	3-3	Alumni Hall; Queens, NY
12/27/74*		vs. Rhode Island; Ocean State Classic	W 78-56	4-3	Providence Civic Center; Providence, RI
12/28/74*		vs. No. 11 South Carolina; Ocean State Classic	W 78-77 ^{OT}	5-3	Providence Civic Center; Providence, RI
12/30/74*		at No. 12 Providence; Ocean State Classic	W 91-78	6-3	Providence Civic Center; Providence, RI
01/04/75*		Georgetown	L 63-67	6-4	Alumni Hall; Queens, NY
01/08/75*		at Hofstra	W 74-50	7-4	Physical Fitness Center; Hempstead, NY
01/11/75*		at Davidson	L 77-81	7-5	Charlotte Coliseum; Charlotte, NC
01/14/75*		Rhode Island	W 100-75	8-5	Alumni Hall; Queens, NY
01/18/75*		St. Francis (NY)	W 103-63	9-5	Alumni Hall; Queens, NY
01/22/75*		at Seton Hall	L 67-72	9-6	Walsh Gymnasium; South Orange, NJ
01/25/75*		at American	W 74-68	10-6	Fort Myer Ceremonial Hall; Washington, D.C.
01/28/75*		at Villanova	W 72-63	11-6	Villanova Field House; Villanova, PA
02/01/75*		at Army	W 105-77	12-6	USMA Fieldhouse; West Point, NY
02/06/75*		Niagara	W 91-57	13-6	Alumni Hall; Queens, NY
02/08/75*		Fordham	W 56-46	14-6	Madison Square Garden; New York, NY
02/13/75*		No. 16 Notre Dame	L 67-68	14-7	Madison Square Garden; New York, NY
02/19/75*		at St. Joseph's	W 92-73	15-7	The Palestra; Philadelphia, PA
02/22/75*		Iona	W 73-47	16-7	Alumni Hall; Queens, NY
02/25/75*		at Holy Cross	W 72-65	17-7	Worcester Auditorium; Worcester, MA
03/01/75*		Providence	W 88-70	18-7	Alumni Hall; Queens, NY
ECAC Metro tournament
03/06/75*		vs. Seton Hall; ECAC Metro Semifinal	W 76-64	19-7	Madison Square Garden; New York, NY
03/08/75*		vs. No. 20 Rutgers; ECAC Metro Final	L 77-79 ^{OT}	19-8	Madison Square Garden; New York, NY
NIT tournament
03/15/75*		vs. Lafayette; NIT First Round	W 94-76	20-8	Madison Square Garden; New York, NY
03/18/75*		vs. Manhattan; NIT Quarterfinal	W 57-56	21-8	Madison Square Garden; New York, NY
03/22/75*		vs. Providence; NIT Semifinal	L 72-85	21-9	Madison Square Garden; New York, NY
03/23/75*		vs. Oregon; NIT Third Place Game	L 76-80 ^{OT}	21-10	Madison Square Garden; New York, NY
*Non-conference game. ^{#}Rankings from AP Poll. (#) Tournament seedings in parentheses.

== Team players drafted into the NBA ==
Round	Pick	Player	NBA club
2	33	Mel Utley	Cleveland Cavaliers
4	67	Kevin Cluess	Kansas City Kings
