= 1975 NCAA Division I basketball championship game =

1975 NCAA Tournament Championship Game
National championship game
UCLA Bruins	Kentucky Wildcats
Pac-8	SEC
(27–3)	(26–4)
92	85
Head coach: John Wooden	Head coach: Joe B. Hall
- AP: 1
- Coaches: 2
- AP: 2
- Coaches: 4
	1st half	2nd half	Total
UCLA Bruins	43	49	92
Kentucky Wildcats	40	45	85
- Date: March 31, 1975
- Venue: San Diego Sports Arena, San Diego, California
- Referees: Hank Nichols and Bob Wortman
- Attendance: 15,153

United States TV coverage
- Network: NBC
- Announcers: Curt Gowdy and Billy Packer

The 1975 NCAA Division I basketball championship game was the final of the 1975 NCAA Division I basketball tournament and determined the national champion for the 1974–75 season. The game was held at the San Diego Sports Arena in San Diego, California, on March 31, 1975.

The UCLA Bruins defeated the Kentucky Wildcats 92–85 to win the program's 10th title in 12 seasons. The 1975 national championship game was the last in the career of UCLA head coach John Wooden, who had been in charge of the Bruins throughout their title-winning run.

== Background ==
=== UCLA Bruins ===
The Bruins entered the 1974–75 season coming off a loss in the Final Four of the 1974 NCAA tournament, which ended a streak of seven consecutive national championships. The team had won titles in nine of the previous 11 seasons, all of which were earned under head coach John Wooden, who was in his 27th season with UCLA. Following the team's defeat against North Carolina State, multiple Bruins players were selected in the 1974 NBA draft, including Bill Walton—who had been chosen as the national player of the year—and Jamaal Wilkes. Senior forward Dave Meyers led the 1974–75 Bruins in scoring with an average of 18.3 points per game, and had a team-high 7.9 rebounds per game. Richard Washington, a sophomore center, added 15.9 points and 7.8 rebounds per game. Sophomore forward Marques Johnson and senior guard Pete Trgovich also had double-figure scoring averages, with 11.6 and 10.2 points per game respectively. Other regulars in the Bruins' roster included center Ralph Drollinger and guard Andre McCarter.

UCLA opened their 1974–75 campaign as the second-ranked team in the country in the AP Poll. Their first game of the season, against Wichita State on November 29, 1974, was an 85–74 victory. That game began a long winning streak for the Bruins, and was the first of seven straight wins by margins greater than 10 points. The Bruins defeated two ranked teams during that stretch: 11th-ranked Memphis State on December 20, and 12th-ranked Notre Dame one day later. Lopsided wins over Davidson and Oklahoma brought the Bruins to 10–0 entering Pac-8 conference play.

On January 9, the Bruins defeated Washington by 10 points in their first conference game. Two days later, a 77–69 win over Washington State brought them to 12–0. Stanford then beat the Bruins, 64–60, giving UCLA their first loss of the season. After a pair of wins, the Bruins had their second loss, in a rematch with Notre Dame. The team then went on a six-game winning streak, which included four games against ranked teams: two against Oregon, and one each against Oregon State and USC. At Washington, the Bruins took a 22-point loss, which left them at 9–2 in the conference. UCLA then won their final three regular season games, concluding with a 72–68 win at USC, then ranked 11th in the country. Entering the tournament, the Bruins were the second-ranked team in the AP Poll, and had a 23–3 record (12–2 in Pac-8 play).

In the first round of the tournament's West region, against Michigan, the Bruins were forced into overtime before emerging with a 103–91 win. The next round also proved competitive, as they defeated Montana by three points, 67–64. That win put the Bruins into the regional final, where they clinched a Final Four appearance with a 14-point victory over Arizona State.

Against Louisville in the Final Four, the Bruins were locked in a tight game late, trailing 65–61 with under a minute remaining. UCLA was able to tie the score and force overtime; it was the second straight year that the Bruins reached overtime in a Final Four game. The Bruins trailed 74–73 as Louisville's Terry Howard shot a one-and-one free throw with 20 seconds on the clock in the extra period. His attempt missed and the Bruins gained possession of the ball. After a timeout and multiple passes, Washington made a jump shot eight feet from the basket for what proved to be the winning points in a 75–74 UCLA win. Following the game, Wooden publicly announced that he would retire after the end of the national championship game.

=== Kentucky Wildcats ===
The Wildcats were coached by Joe B. Hall, who was in his third season at the position. The previous season, the team finished at 13–13, failing to qualify for the NCAA tournament for the first time since 1967. Senior guard Kevin Grevey was the Wildcats' leading scorer, with a 23.5 point-per-game average in 1974–75; he also averaged 6.4 rebounds. The top rebounder on the team was freshman center Rick Robey, who had an average of 6.9 per game while contributing 10.4 points per game. Jimmy Dan Connor, a senior guard, was second on the team in scoring at 12.4 points per game. Forward Jack Givens averaged 9.4 points per game, while guard Mike Flynn had 9.0. Other players on the Kentucky roster included forward Bob Guyette, center Mike Phillips, guard Larry Johnson, and forward James Lee.

Northwestern, Kentucky's first opponent in the 1974–75 season, fell by a 97–70 margin on November 30. After a road win over Miami (Ohio), the Wildcats traveled to Indiana to face the third-ranked Hoosiers, and were defeated 98–74. The Wildcats rebounded with a 12-point victory over North Carolina, who were ranked eighth in the country. It was the start of a seven-game winning streak, which included a 113–96 result over 13th-ranked Notre Dame and the first two games in the Southeastern Conference (SEC) schedule. Following a 90–85 loss to Auburn, the Wildcats had a nine-game run of victores, including a pair of wins against ranked schools: a six-point win over number 18 Tennessee and a five-point win over number six Alabama.

Kentucky had a pair of defeats in their next four games, although one of the wins was a second victory over Alabama. The team's regular season concluded with wins over Vanderbilt and Mississippi State. The Wildcats' record stood at 22–4 overall, and they finished in first place in the SEC with a 15–3 conference record. They were the number five team in the AP Poll entering the NCAA tournament.

Having been placed in the Mideast region of the tournament, the Wildcats' first-round game against Marquette ended in a 22-point win. In the regional semifinals, Kentucky posted a 90–73 result over Central Michigan to advance to the regional final, where the team faced Indiana, the top-ranked team in men's college basketball before the tournament. The Hoosiers had a record of 30–0 entering the game, but were short-handed; All-American Scott May, feeling the effects of a broken arm suffered earlier in the season, was limited to seven minutes of game time. In a rematch against a team that had beaten them by 24 points in the regular season, Kentucky prevailed 92–90. That victory got the Wildcats into the Final Four, where they defeated Syracuse, 95–79, to book a place in the national title game against UCLA.

== Game summary ==
The crowd for the 1975 national championship game, held at the San Diego Sports Arena, was announced as 15,153. The contest was preceded by a third-place game between the losing Final Four teams, Louisville and Syracuse; it was the last year that the NCAA held a consolation game. Louisville had a 16-point lead at halftime before Syracuse rallied to tie the score and force overtime, where the Cardinals outscored the Orangemen 18–10 to clinch a 96–88 victory. In the first half, the game proceeded at what Sports Illustrated's Curry Kirkpatrick called a "furious pace". During the half, there were five ties and the lead changed hands 15 times. The Wildcats had the advantage for the majority of the period; the Los Angeles Times's Ben Bolch later wrote that "UCLA appeared tight early, its shots mostly missing, as if the Bruins wanted too badly to send Wooden out a winner." However, the Bruins grew into the game in the latter stages of the half. Twelve of the lead changes occurred in the opening six minutes, as the teams remained within a single point of each other. Kentucky's Grevey went on a scoring run, accounting for two field goals and two free throws that pushed the Wildcats to a five-point lead. A Meyers basket for UCLA was countered by a three-point play from Givens.

Seven minutes into the game, Kentucky held a 20–14 advantage, the team's largest lead of the game. UCLA responded by scoring the next six points to force a tie, and the teams traded scores until the scores were even at 27–27. Kentucky's Grevey tallied the next four points, part of his 18 points in the first 12 minutes of play, which helped the Wildcats to a four-point lead at that point. In response to Grevey's play, Wooden inserted Drollinger into the game; he was the only reserve who saw action for UCLA. With the change, Washington was assigned to help defend Grevey; he was three inches taller than Grevey's previous defender, Johnson, and it took 18 minutes for Grevey to score again. The Bruins went on an 8–3 scoring run, and a basket by Trgovich gave them the lead with just over four minutes remaining in the half, 35–34. Trgovich hit five baskets in the latter stages of the half. During the rest of the period, UCLA slightly increased its lead, ending the half on top 43–40.

Twice in the early part of the second half, UCLA took a six-point lead, only for Kentucky to rally to within two points. By the middle of the second half, UCLA had extended its lead, and scores by Meyers and Washington brought their margin to 10 points, 66–56, with 12 minutes remaining on the clock. The Wildcats then rallied with three three-point plays, two by Grevey and one by Flynn. A successful 20-foot shot by Grevey brought Kentucky to within 76–75, with under seven minutes left. Then came what Kirkpatrick called a key turning point in the game. Meyers was called for an offensive foul on a shot attempt during which he bumped into Grevey. Meyers responded strongly to the call and was hit with a technical foul, which prompted Wooden to run onto the court and call referee Hank Nichols a "crook". Kentucky would have a technical foul shot and one-and-one free throws from the original foul call, and would retain possession; this gave the Wildcats a chance to gain the lead, with the three free throws and a potential basket afterwards. However, Grevey missed on both the free throw from the technical foul and the front end of the one-and-one. On the Wildcats' subsequent possession, Lee was called for an offensive foul for setting a pick, leaving Kentucky scoreless from the series of plays.

The teams exchanged points on a pair of free throws by Meyers and a successful bank shot attempt by Guyette, before a missed shot by Johnson was tipped in by Washington to put UCLA up 80–77. Two Trgovich free throws stretched the Bruins' advantage to five points, with under five minutes left. Although the Wildcats cut their deficit to three points on three occasions, and twice had possession of the ball while down three, they were unable to come any closer than that. After holding an 88–85 lead, UCLA tallied the last four points to earn the win, 92–85.

== Statistical summary ==
UCLA converted 38 of its 78 field goal attempts, for a 48.7% rate, and made 16 of its 25 free throw attempts. The Bruins' shooting outpaced that of Kentucky, which made only 38.4% of its shot attempts (33-for-86). The Wildcats did make three more free throws than UCLA, in the same number of attempts.

Grevey led all scorers for both teams with 34 points on 13-of-30 shooting from the field. Guyette made seven of his eleven field goal attempts and had 16 points, including 14 in the second half, while Flynn added 10 points. Those were the only three Wildcats players to score in double figures. Of the six Bruins players to appear in the game, four had 10 points or more. Washington led UCLA with 28 points on 12-of-23 shooting from the field; he was named the tournament's Most Outstanding Player. He was followed by Meyers, who had 24 points and made half of his 18 shots. Trgovich contributed 16 points, while Drollinger came off the bench to score 10 points in 16 minutes.

UCLA had a narrow rebounding advantage over Kentucky, 50–45. Drollinger led the team with 13 rebounds, while Washington and Meyers had 12 and 11, respectively. Robey had nine rebounds to lead the Wildcats. The Bruins had 23 assists, seven more than the Wildcats; McCarter had 14 of the Bruins' assists, the most of any player in the game.

== Aftermath ==
Gene Bartow succeeded Wooden as the Bruins' head coach for the 1975–76 season. UCLA went 27–5 and reached the 1976 Final Four, The team did not return to the national championship game until 1980 (later vacated due to NCAA sanctions), and has won the title once since Wooden's tenure, in 1995 under Jim Harrick.

Hall's Wildcats had a 20–10 record in 1975–76 and did not qualify for the NCAA tournament. After a regional final appearance the following season, the Wildcats ended up winning the national title in 1978, which was the program's first championship in 20 years.
