= 1974–75 Centenary Gentlemen basketball team =

American college basketball season

1974–75 Centenary Gentlemen men's basketball
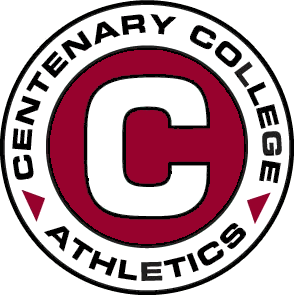
- Conference: Independent
- Record: 25–4
- Head coach: Larry Little (4th season)
- Home arena: Gold Dome

1974–75 NCAA Division I men's basketball independents standings
	Conf.				Overall
Team	W		L	PCT	W		L	PCT
Texas–Pan American		–		–	22	–	2	.917
UNC Charlotte		–		–	23	–	3	.885
Centenary (LA)		–		–	25	–	4	.862
No. 11 Marquette		–		–	23	–	4	.852
Stetson		–		–	22	–	4	.846
No. 13 Cincinnati		–		–	23	–	6	.793
Utah State		–		–	21	–	6	.778
Rutgers		–		–	22	–	7	.759
Creighton		–		–	20	–	7	.741
Memphis State		–		–	20	–	7	.741
South Alabama		–		–	19	–	7	.731
No. 6 Syracuse		–		–	23	–	9	.719
Holy Cross		–		–	20	–	8	.714
Oral Roberts		–		–	20	–	8	.714
Boston College		–		–	21	–	9	.700
Florida State		–		–	18	–	8	.692
Portland State		–		–	18	–	8	.692
UC Santa Barbara		–		–	18	–	8	.692
VCU		–		–	17	–	8	.680
South Carolina		–		–	19	–	9	.679
St. John's		–		–	21	–	10	.677
Southern Illinois		–		–	18	–	9	.667
No. 14 Notre Dame		–		–	19	–	10	.655
Detroit		–		–	17	–	9	.654
No. 20 Providence		–		–	20	–	11	.645
Georgetown		–		–	18	–	10	.643
George Washington		–		–	17	–	10	.630
Pittsburgh		–		–	18	–	11	.621
Houston		–		–	16	–	10	.615
Illinois State		–		–	16	–	10	.615
Tulane		–		–	16	–	10	.615
Virginia Tech		–		–	16	–	10	.615
Canisius		–		–	15	–	10	.600
DePaul		–		–	15	–	10	.600
Northeast Louisiana		–		–	15	–	10	.600
South Florida		–		–	15	–	10	.600
Seton Hall		–		–	16	–	11	.593
Jacksonville		–		–	15	–	11	.577
Duquesne		–		–	14	–	11	.560
Hawaii		–		–	14	–	11	.560
Saint Peter's		–		–	15	–	12	.556
Cleveland State		–		–	13	–	11	.542
Manhattan		–		–	14	–	12	.538
Air Force		–		–	13	–	12	.520
LIU		–		–	13	–	12	.520
St. Bonaventure		–		–	14	–	13	.519
West Virginia		–		–	14	–	13	.519
Cal State Los Angeles		–		–	13	–	13	.500
Marshall		–		–	13	–	13	.500
Navy		–		–	12	–	12	.500
Northeastern		–		–	12	–	12	.500
Fairfield		–		–	13	–	14	.481
Niagara		–		–	13	–	14	.481
Fordham		–		–	12	–	13	.480
Penn State		–		–	11	–	12	.478
Indiana State		–		–	12	–	14	.462
Oklahoma City		–		–	12	–	14	.462
Saint Louis		–		–	12	–	14	.462
Fairleigh Dickinson		–		–	11	–	13	.458
Portland		–		–	13	–	16	.448
Saint Francis (PA)		–		–	11	–	14	.440
Georgia Tech		–		–	11	–	15	.423
Southern Miss		–		–	11	–	15	.423
Xavier		–		–	11	–	15	.423
Ball State		–		–	10	–	15	.400
Loyola-Chicago		–		–	10	–	15	.400
Butler		–		–	10	–	16	.385
Dayton		–		–	10	–	16	.385
Denver		–		–	9	–	16	.360
Northern Illinois		–		–	8	–	15	.348
Houston Baptist		–		–	9	–	17	.346
Mercer		–		–	9	–	17	.346
Samford		–		–	9	–	17	.346
Colgate		–		–	8	–	16	.333
Villanova		–		–	9	–	18	.333
Buffalo		–		–	8	–	17	.320
Georgia Southern		–		–	8	–	18	.308
Georgia State		–		–	8	–	18	.308
Wisconsin-Milwaukee		–		–	8	–	18	.308
St. Francis (NY)		–		–	7	–	19	.269
Baptist		–		–	4	–	16	.200
Hardin-Simmons		–		–	5	–	20	.200
Iona		–		–	4	–	19	.174
Army		–		–	3	–	22	.120
Rankings from AP Poll

The 1974–75 Centenary Gents basketball team represented Centenary College of Louisiana as an NCAA Division I Independent during the 1974–75 college basketball season. The team was coached by Larry Little and played their home games at Gold Dome in Shreveport, Louisiana. Led by junior center Robert Parish, future Naismith Memorial Basketball Hall of Fame and College Basketball Hall of Fame inductee, the Gents finished with an overall record of 25–4.

== Roster ==
1974–75 Centenary Gentlemen men's basketball team
Players
Coaches

Pos.	#	Name	Height	Weight	Year	Previous school	Hometown
C	00	Robert Parish	7 ft 0 in (2.13 m)	220 lb (100 kg)	Jr	Woodlawn HS	Shreveport, Louisiana
		Nate Bland	—	—	Jr
		Leon Johnson	—	—	Sr		Newark, New Jersey
		Barry McLeod	—	—	Jr
		John Pitts	—	—	So
		Bobby White	—	—	Fr

Head coach

- Larry Little

Assistant coach(es)

Legend

- (C) Team captain
- (S) Suspended
- (I) Ineligible
- (W) Walk-on
- Injured
- Current redshirt

== Schedule and results ==
Date time, TV	Rank^{#}	Opponent^{#}	Result	Record	High points	High rebounds	High assists	Site city, state
Regular Season
Nov 29, 1974*		vs. UNC Charlotte; Hall of Fame Tournament	L 66–69	0–1	–	–	–	Springfield, Massachusetts
Nov 30, 1974*		vs. Dartmouth; Hall of Fame Tournament	W 98–62	1–1	–	–	–	Springfield, Massachusetts
Dec 3, 1974*		at Lamar	W 99–78	2–1	–	–	–	McDonald Gym; Beaumont, Texas
Dec 4, 1974*		Texas	W 96–71	3–1	–	–	–	Gold Dome; Shreveport, Louisiana
Dec 9, 1974*		Northwestern State	W 102–89	4–1	–	27 – Parish	–	Gold Dome; Shreveport, Louisiana
Dec 14, 1974*		McNeese State	W 76–71	5–1	–	–	–	Gold Dome; Shreveport, Louisiana
Dec 17, 1974*		at Virginia Commonwealth	L 75–76	5–2	–	–	–	Franklin Street Gym
Dec 26, 1974*		vs. Pacific; All-College Tournament	W 90–81	6–2	–	–	–	Frederickson Fieldhouse; Oklahoma City, Oklahoma
Dec 28, 1974*		vs. North Texas State	W 80–78	7–2	–	–	–	Frederickson Fieldhouse; Oklahoma City, Oklahoma
Dec 29, 1974*		at Oklahoma City	W 91–80	8–2	–	–	–	Frederickson Fieldhouse; Oklahoma City, Oklahoma
Jan, 1975*		Wabash College	W 110–62	9–2	–	–	–	Gold Dome; Shreveport, Louisiana
Jan, 1975*		East Texas Baptist	W 96–71	10–2	–	–	–	Gold Dome; Shreveport, Louisiana
Jan 6, 1975*		Arkansas	W 74–72	11–2	–	–	–	Gold Dome; Shreveport, Louisiana
Jan 9, 1975*		Hawaii	L 78–79	11–3	–	–	–	Gold Dome; Shreveport, Louisiana
Jan 13, 1975*		Lamar	W 105–83	12–3	–	–	–	Gold Dome; Shreveport, Louisiana
Jan 16, 1975*		at Southern Mississippi	W 96–75	13–3	–	–	–	Reed Green Coliseum; Hattiesburg, Mississippi
Jan 18, 1975*		at Indiana State	W 84–74	14–3	–	–	–	Hulman Center; Terre Haute, Indiana
Jan 25, 1975*		at Houston Baptist	W 88–70	15–3	–	–	–	Sharp Gymnasium; Houston, Texas
Jan 27, 1975*		Virginia Commonwealth	W 73–66	16–3	–	–	–	Gold Dome; Shreveport, Louisiana
Feb 1, 1975*		Southern Mississippi	W 105–81	17–3	–	–	–	Gold Dome; Shreveport, Louisiana
Feb, 1975*		at Northwestern State	W 102–89	18–3	–	–	–	Prather Coliseum; Natchitoches, Louisiana
Feb 8, 1975*		Houston Baptist	W 96–83	19–3	–	–	–	Gold Dome; Shreveport, Louisiana
Feb 10, 1975*		at Hardin-Simmons	W 80–67	20–3	–	–	–	Taylor County Expo Center; Abilene, Texas
Feb 13, 1975*		Indiana State	W 78–74	21–3	–	–	–	Gold Dome; Shreveport, Louisiana
Feb 15, 1975*		Southern Illinois	W 71–66	22–3	–	–	–	Gold Dome; Shreveport, Louisiana
Feb 20, 1975*	No. 18	at Hawaii–Hilo	W 103–91	23–3	–	–	–	Afook-Chinen Civic Auditorium; Hilo, Hawaii
Feb 21, 1975*	No. 18	at Hawaii	W 101–93	24–3	–	–	–	Neal S. Blaisdell Center; Honolulu, Hawaii
Feb 22, 1975*	No. 18	at Hawaii	L 89–95	24–4	–	–	–	Neal S. Blaisdell Center; Honolulu, Hawaii
Mar 1, 1975*		Hardin-Simmons	W 91–64	25–4	–	–	–	Gold Dome; Shreveport, Louisiana
*Non-conference game. ^{#}Rankings from AP Poll. (#) Tournament seedings in parentheses.

== Awards and honors ==
- Robert Parish – Third-Team All-American (NABC), Honorable Mention All-American (AP)
