= Roy Danforth =

American college sports administrator (born 1936)

Biographical details
- Born: January 12, 1936 (age 90); Summitville, Indiana, U.S.

Playing career
- 1959–1962: Southern Miss

Coaching career (HC unless noted)

Men's basketball
- 1963–1964: Pearl River Junior College
- 1964–1968: Syracuse (assistant)
- 1968–1976: Syracuse
- 1976–1981: Tulane

Administrative career (AD unless noted)
- 1981–1986: Tulane (assistant AD)
- 1986–1995: Fairleigh Dickinson

Head coaching record
- Overall: 193–161 (.545)

Roy Danforth Jr. (born January 12, 1936), a native of Summitville, Indiana, was the head basketball coach at Syracuse from 1968 to 1976. During his tenure, he compiled a 148–71 (.676) record. In his final four years as a coach, his teams went to the NCAA tournament, including an appearance in the Final Four in 1975. He was credited with rebuilding the Syracuse program, and gave the Orange a terrific home-court advantage. He played college basketball at Southern Mississippi where he scored over 1,000 points and was a 75% career free-throw shooter.

Danforth left Syracuse to succeed Charles Moir at Tulane on April 5, 1976. He signed a three-year contract with a $30,000 annual salary. He was replaced at Syracuse by Jim Boeheim two days prior on April 3. He announced on February 16, 1981, his resignation as Green Wave head coach at the conclusion of the season. He stayed at the university as its assistant athletic director. He was replaced as head coach by Ned Fowler on March 17, 1981. Following his tenure at Tulane, Danforth accepted the athletic director position at Fairleigh Dickinson University.

== Head coaching record ==
Record table
Season	Team	Overall	Conference	Standing	Postseason
Syracuse Orange (Independent) (1968–1976)
1968–69	Syracuse	9–16			
1969–70	Syracuse	12–12			
1970–71	Syracuse	19–7			NIT first round
1971–72	Syracuse	22–6			NIT quarterfinals
1972–73	Syracuse	24–5			NCAA Tournament East semifinals
1973–74	Syracuse	19–7			NCAA Tournament Midwest quarterfinals
1974–75	Syracuse	23–9			NCAA Tournament National semifinals
1975–76	Syracuse	20–9			NCAA Tournament Midwest quarterfinals
Syracuse:		148–71			
Tulane Green Wave (Metro South) (1976–1981)
1976–77	Tulane	10–17	3–3	T-3rd	
1977–78	Tulane	5–22	1–11	7th	
1978–79	Tulane	8–19	2–8	7th	
1979–80	Tulane	10–17	3–9	T-6th	
1980–81	Tulane	12–15	4–8	6th	
Tulane:		45–90	13–39		
Total:		193–161			
National champion Postseason invitational champion Conference regular season champion Conference regular season and conference tournament champion Division regular season champion Division regular season and conference tournament champion Conference tournament champion

== See also ==
- List of NCAA Division I Men's Final Four appearances by coach
