= 1974–75 Syracuse Orangemen basketball team =

American college basketball season

1974–75 Syracuse Orangemen basketball

NCAA tournament, Final Four
- Conference: Independent

Ranking
- AP: No. 6
- Record: 23–9
- Head coach: Roy Danforth (7th season)
- Assistant coaches: Jim Boeheim (6th season); Tom Green (3rd season)
- Home arena: Manley Field House

1974–75 NCAA Division I men's basketball independents standings
	Conf.				Overall
Team	W		L	PCT	W		L	PCT
Texas–Pan American		–		–	22	–	2	.917
UNC Charlotte		–		–	23	–	3	.885
Centenary (LA)		–		–	25	–	4	.862
No. 11 Marquette		–		–	23	–	4	.852
Stetson		–		–	22	–	4	.846
No. 13 Cincinnati		–		–	23	–	6	.793
Utah State		–		–	21	–	6	.778
Rutgers		–		–	22	–	7	.759
Creighton		–		–	20	–	7	.741
Memphis State		–		–	20	–	7	.741
South Alabama		–		–	19	–	7	.731
No. 6 Syracuse		–		–	23	–	9	.719
Holy Cross		–		–	20	–	8	.714
Oral Roberts		–		–	20	–	8	.714
Boston College		–		–	21	–	9	.700
Florida State		–		–	18	–	8	.692
Portland State		–		–	18	–	8	.692
UC Santa Barbara		–		–	18	–	8	.692
VCU		–		–	17	–	8	.680
South Carolina		–		–	19	–	9	.679
St. John's		–		–	21	–	10	.677
Southern Illinois		–		–	18	–	9	.667
No. 14 Notre Dame		–		–	19	–	10	.655
Detroit		–		–	17	–	9	.654
No. 20 Providence		–		–	20	–	11	.645
Georgetown		–		–	18	–	10	.643
George Washington		–		–	17	–	10	.630
Pittsburgh		–		–	18	–	11	.621
Houston		–		–	16	–	10	.615
Illinois State		–		–	16	–	10	.615
Tulane		–		–	16	–	10	.615
Virginia Tech		–		–	16	–	10	.615
Canisius		–		–	15	–	10	.600
DePaul		–		–	15	–	10	.600
Northeast Louisiana		–		–	15	–	10	.600
South Florida		–		–	15	–	10	.600
Seton Hall		–		–	16	–	11	.593
Jacksonville		–		–	15	–	11	.577
Duquesne		–		–	14	–	11	.560
Hawaii		–		–	14	–	11	.560
Saint Peter's		–		–	15	–	12	.556
Cleveland State		–		–	13	–	11	.542
Manhattan		–		–	14	–	12	.538
Air Force		–		–	13	–	12	.520
LIU		–		–	13	–	12	.520
St. Bonaventure		–		–	14	–	13	.519
West Virginia		–		–	14	–	13	.519
Cal State Los Angeles		–		–	13	–	13	.500
Marshall		–		–	13	–	13	.500
Navy		–		–	12	–	12	.500
Northeastern		–		–	12	–	12	.500
Fairfield		–		–	13	–	14	.481
Niagara		–		–	13	–	14	.481
Fordham		–		–	12	–	13	.480
Penn State		–		–	11	–	12	.478
Indiana State		–		–	12	–	14	.462
Oklahoma City		–		–	12	–	14	.462
Saint Louis		–		–	12	–	14	.462
Fairleigh Dickinson		–		–	11	–	13	.458
Portland		–		–	13	–	16	.448
Saint Francis (PA)		–		–	11	–	14	.440
Georgia Tech		–		–	11	–	15	.423
Southern Miss		–		–	11	–	15	.423
Xavier		–		–	11	–	15	.423
Ball State		–		–	10	–	15	.400
Loyola-Chicago		–		–	10	–	15	.400
Butler		–		–	10	–	16	.385
Dayton		–		–	10	–	16	.385
Denver		–		–	9	–	16	.360
Northern Illinois		–		–	8	–	15	.348
Houston Baptist		–		–	9	–	17	.346
Mercer		–		–	9	–	17	.346
Samford		–		–	9	–	17	.346
Colgate		–		–	8	–	16	.333
Villanova		–		–	9	–	18	.333
Buffalo		–		–	8	–	17	.320
Georgia Southern		–		–	8	–	18	.308
Georgia State		–		–	8	–	18	.308
Wisconsin-Milwaukee		–		–	8	–	18	.308
St. Francis (NY)		–		–	7	–	19	.269
Baptist		–		–	4	–	16	.200
Hardin-Simmons		–		–	5	–	20	.200
Iona		–		–	4	–	19	.174
Army		–		–	3	–	22	.120
Rankings from AP Poll

The 1974–75 Syracuse Orangemen basketball team represented Syracuse University in the 1974–75 NCAA Division I men's basketball season. The Head coach was Roy Danforth, serving for his 7th year. The team played home games at Manley Field House in Syracuse, New York. Syracuse reached the Final Four of the NCAA tournament – the first in program history – and finished with a 23–9 record.

== Roster ==
1974–75 Syracuse Orange men's basketball team
Players
Coaches

Pos.	#	Name	Height	Weight	Year	Hometown
G	10	Jim Lee	6 ft 2 in (1.88 m)	160 lb (73 kg)	Sr	Kirkwood, New York
G	11	Larry Kelley	6 ft 0 in (1.83 m)	—	So	New Haven, Connecticut
G	13	Larry Arrington	—	—	So	Washington, D.C.
G	20	Ross Kindel	6 ft 2 in (1.88 m)	—	Fr	Roselle, New Jersey
G	22	Jimmy Williams	5 ft 10 in (1.78 m)	—	So	Buffalo, New York
F	25	Mark Meador	6 ft 5 in (1.96 m)	190 lb (86 kg)	So	Wolcott, Connecticut
G/F	32	Kevin King	6 ft 4 in (1.93 m)	—	Jr	New York, New York
F/C	44	Marty Byrnes	6 ft 7 in (2.01 m)	210 lb (95 kg)	Fr	Pittsford, New York
F/C	45	Rudy Hackett	6 ft 9 in (2.06 m)	210 lb (95 kg)	Sr	Mount Vernon, New York
F	55	Chris Sease	6 ft 4 in (1.93 m)	—	Jr	Syracuse, New York
F	44	Bill DeMarle	6 ft 4 in (1.93 m)	210 lb (95 kg)	Fr	Mahopac, New York

Head coach

- Roy Danforth (Southern Miss)

Assistant coach(es)

Legend

- (C) Team captain
- (S) Suspended
- (I) Ineligible
- (W) Walk-on
- Injured
- Current redshirt

Roster
Last update: 2021-May-8

== Schedule and results ==
Date time, TV	Rank^{#}	Opponent^{#}	Result	Record	Site city, state
Regular season
Nov 30, 1974*		at Buffalo	W 81–65	1–0	Clark Memorial Gym; Buffalo, New York
Dec 4, 1974*		at Cornell	W 78–49	2–0	Barton Hall; Ithaca, New York
Dec 7, 1974*		Army	W 95–59	3–0	Manley Field House; Syracuse, New York
Dec 10, 1974*		St. John's	W 75–66	4–0	Manley Field House; Syracuse, New York
Dec 14, 1974*		at No. 20 Providence	L 57–80	4–1	Providence Civic Center; Providence, Rhode Island
Dec 17, 1974*		Penn State	W 75–71	5–1	Manley Field House; Syracuse, New York
Dec 27, 1974*		vs. Georgetown; Kodak Classic Semifinal/Rivalry	L 70–71	5–2	Rochester, New York
Dec 28, 1974*		at Rochester; Kodak Classic Third Place	W 93–65	6–2	Rochester, New York
Jan 4, 1975*		Pittsburgh	W 77–68	7–2	Manley Field House; Syracuse, New York
Jan 8, 1975*		Bowling Green State	W 90–61	8–2	Manley Field House; Syracuse, New York
Jan 11, 1975*		Northeastern	W 94–75	9–2	Manley Field House; Syracuse, New York
Jan 18, 1975*		American	W 98–84	10–2	Manley Field House; Syracuse, New York
Jan 22, 1975*		at Temple	W 62–57	11–2	McGonigle Hall; Philadelphia, Pennsylvania
Jan 25, 1975*		at Boston College	L 73–79	11–3	Roberts Center; Boston, Massachusetts
Jan 29, 1975*		at Penn State	L 84–88	11–4	Rec Hall; University Park, Pennsylvania
Feb 1, 1975*		No. 7 La Salle	W 82–78	12–4	Manley Field House; Syracuse, New York
Feb 4, 1975*		at St. Bonaventure	W 97–89	13–4	Reilly Center; St. Bonaventure, New York
Feb 6, 1975*		No. 19 Rutgers	L 75–76	13–5	Manley Field House; Syracuse, New York
Feb 8, 1975*		West Virginia	L 81–84	13–6	Manley Field House; Syracuse, New York
Feb 12, 1975*		Colgate	W 85–63	14–6	Manley Field House; Syracuse, New York
Feb 15, 1975*		at Canisius	L 76–80	14–7	Buffalo Memorial Auditorium; Buffalo, New York
Feb 22, 1975*		at George Washington	W 71–64	15–7	Fort Myer Ceremonial Hall; Washington, D.C.
Feb 26, 1975*		Niagara	W 79–66	16–7	Manley Field House; Syracuse, New York
Mar 1, 1975*		at Manhattan	W 74–69	17–7	Madison Square Garden; New York, New York
Mar 3, 1975*		at Fordham	W 88–73	18–7	Rose Hill Gym; Bronx, New York
ECAC Upstate Tournament
Mar 7, 1975*		at Niagara; ECAC Upstate Tournament Semifinal	W 90–72	19–7	Buffalo Memorial Auditorium; Buffalo, New York
Mar 8, 1975*		at St. Bonaventure; ECAC Upstate Tournament Final	W 100–81	20–7	Buffalo Memorial Auditorium; Buffalo, New York
NCAA Tournament
Mar 15, 1975*		vs. La Salle; East Regional Quarterfinal	W 87–83 ^{OT}	21–7	The Palestra; Philadelphia, Pennsylvania
Mar 20, 1975*	No. 20	vs. No. 6 North Carolina; East Regional semifinal – Sweet Sixteen	W 78–76	22–7	Providence Civic Center; Providence, Rhode Island
Mar 22, 1975*	No. 20	vs. No. 17 Kansas State; East Regional Final – Elite Eight	W 95–87 ^{OT}	23–7	Providence Civic Center; Providence, Rhode Island
Mar 29, 1975*	No. 6	vs. No. 2 Kentucky; National semifinal – Final Four	L 79–95	23–8	San Diego Sports Arena; San Diego, California
Mar 31, 1975*	No. 6	vs. No. 4 Louisville; National consolation Game	L 88–96 ^{OT}	23–9	San Diego Sports Arena; San Diego, California
*Non-conference game. ^{#}Rankings from AP Poll. (#) Tournament seedings in parentheses.

== NBA draft ==
Round	Pick	Player	NBA club
3	37	Rudy Hackett	New Orleans Jazz
