= VCU Rams men's basketball, 1968–1979 =

American collegiate basketball team seasons

The VCU Rams men's basketball team represents Virginia Commonwealth University in Richmond, Virginia, United States. The program was established in 1967, and began play in the 1968–69 season. This article is a list of results and statistics of the men's basketball team from the 1968–69 season to the 1978–79 season during which the team played as an NCAA Independent.

Contents:	1968–69 – 1969–70 – 1970–71 – 1971–72 – 1972–73 – 1973–74 – 1974–75 – 1975–76 – 1976–77 – 1977–78 – 1978–79 – NBA Draft selections – Notes

== 1968–69 ==
1968–69 VCU Rams men's basketball
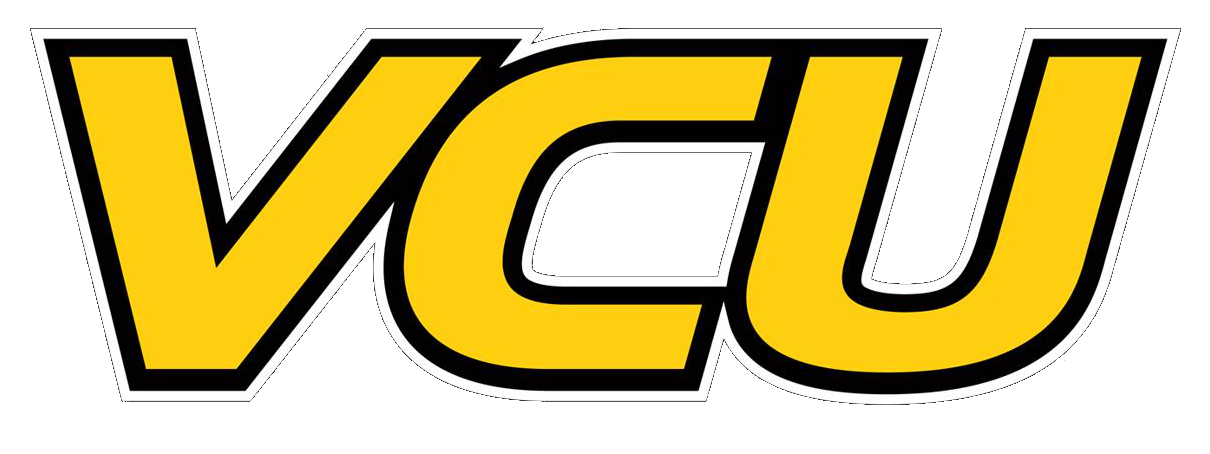
- Conference: Independent
- Record: 12–11
- Head coach: Benny Dees
- Home arena: Franklin Street Gym

The 1968–69 VCU Rams men's basketball team represented the newly created Virginia Commonwealth University during the 1968–69 NCAA men's basketball season. Led by Benny Dees, the Rams played their inaugural season as an independent team, playing a mix of Division I, II and III schools across the Mid-Atlantic, Ohio River Valley and Southeast regions. After an 0–4 start, the Rams finished the season with a winning record of 12–11. During the season, they played in two winter tournaments; the Fort Eustis and Quantico tournaments held at Virginia military bases, Joint Base Langley–Eustis and Marine Corps Base Quantico, respectively. The team did not earn a berth into either the NCAA or NIT tournaments.

During the team's inaugural season, the Rams played in the Franklin Street Gymnasium, which was their home arena until the opening of the Siegel Center in the late 1990s.

Date	Opponent	Rank	Site	Result	Attendance	Record	Notes
November 27	Augusta		Augusta, GA	L 71–89		0–1	
November 30	Georgia Southern		Statesboro, GA	L 88–105		0–2	
December 6	Washington and Lee		Franklin Street Gym • Richmond, VA	L 70–83		0–3	
December 7	Hampden–Sydney		Farmville, VA	L 79–83		0–4	
December 9	N. News Apprentice		Franklin Street Gym • Richmond, VA	W 78–69		1–4	
December 13	Southeastern		Franklin Street Gym • Richmond, VA	W 120–77		2–4	
December 14	Pembroke State		Pembroke, NC	W 86–77		3–4	
December 18	Bridgewater		Quantico, VA	W 101–84		4–4	Quantico Tournament
December 19	NYIT		Quantico, VA	L 81–103		4–5	Quantico Tournament
December 20	West Liberty State		Quantico, VA	W 106–100 (ot)		5–5	Quantico Tournament
December 21	Maryland State		Quantico, VA	L 69–71		5–6	Quantico Tournament
December 27	Roanoke		Newport News, VA	L 59–84		5–7	Fort Eustis Tournament
December 28	West Virginia State		Newport News, VA	W 79–73		6–7	Fort Eustis Tournament
December 29	Denison		Newport News, VA	W 76–69		7–7	Fort Eustis Tournament
January 7	Washington and Lee		Lexington, VA	L 75–80		7–8	
January 9	Virginia Union		Richmond, VA	W 96–74		8–8	
January 11	Pembroke State		Franklin Street Gym • Richmond, VA	W 72–57		9–8	
January 15	High Point		High Point, NC	L 77–109		9–9	
February 5	Old Dominion		Norfolk, VA	L 69–101		9–10	
February 8	Southeastern		Lakeland, FL	W 89–60		10–10	
February 12	Virginia Union		Franklin Street Gym • Richmond, VA	L 82–89		10–11	
February 18	Bridgewater		Franklin Street Gym • Richmond, VA	W 95–86		11–11	
February 20	Hampden–Sydney		Franklin Street Gym • Richmond, VA	W 101–84		12–11	

Source: Men's Basketball 1968–69 Results, VCU Athetlics

== 1969–70 ==
Date	Opponent	Location	Result
Nov. 28	College of Charleston	Franklin Street Gym	W, 142-83
Dec. 2	Long Island	Long Island, N.Y.	L, 67-72
Dec. 4	Western Kentucky	Bowling Green, Ky.	L, 73-115
Dec. 6	Tennessee Tech	Cookeville, Tenn.	L, 81-88
Dec. 8	Providence	Providence, R.I.	L, 71-103
Dec. 10	Old Dominion	Franklin Street Gym	L, 82-93
Dec. 16	Hampden-Sydney	Franklin Street Gym	W, 85-59
Dec. 19	Atlantic Christian	Franklin Street Gym	W, 123-99
Dec. 22	Akron	Akron, Ohio	W, 87-85
Jan. 5	Washington & Lee	Franklin Street Gym	W, 90-83
Jan. 10	Southeastern	Franklin Street Gym	W, 110-78
Jan. 21	Old Dominion	Norfolk, Va.	L, 90-94
Jan. 24	Loyola	New Orleans, La.	L, 99-121
Feb. 4	Virginia State	Franklin Street Gym	W(ot), 96-92
Feb. 6	York	Franklin Street Gym	W, 96-77
Feb. 7	Virginia Union	Franklin Street Gym	W, 103-93
Feb. 9	Atlantic Christian	Wilson, N.C.	W, 111-87
Feb. 10	Pikeville	Franklin Street Gym	W, 106-80
Feb. 16	High Point	Franklin Street Gym	W, 105-77
Feb. 19	Hampden-Sydney	Farmville, Va	W, 87-81
Feb. 21	Ohio	Franklin Street Gym	L, 75-95
Feb. 23	Eastern Kentucky	Richmond, Ky.	L, 78-84
Feb. 24	Washington & Lee	Farmville, Va.	L, 71-87

== 1970–71 ==
Date	Opponent	Location	Result
Dec. 1	Bradley	Peoria, Il.	L, 70-102
Dec. 2	Butler	Indianapolis, Ind.	L, 97-99
Dec. 3	DePaul	Chicago, Il.	L, 77-100
Dec. 5	Bluefield State	Franklin Street Gym	W, 105-86
Dec. 7	Campbell	Franklin Street Gym	W, 79-78
Dec. 10	Western Kentucky	Bowling Green, KY	L, 71-96
Dec. 12	Eastern Kentucky	Richmond, KY	L, 80-107
Dec. 19	Akron	Franklin Street Gym	W, 74-70
Dec. 28	Minnesota	Franklin Street Gym	W, 63-56
Jan. 6	Mount St. Mary's	Franklin Street Gym	W, 97-78
Jan. 9	UNC Wilmington	Franklin Street Gym	W, 114-66
Jan. 18	Haverford	Franklin Street Gym	W, 93-49
Jan. 22	Virginia Union	Richmond, Va.	W, 90-76
Jan. 25	Virginia State	Petersburg, Va.	W, 107-68
Jan. 28	Arkansas State	Jonesboro, Ark.	L, 86-94
Jan. 30	LSU-New Orleans	New Orleans, La.	L, 96-99
Feb. 5	Southeastern	Franklin Street Gym	W, 116-56
Feb. 10	Old Dominion	Franklin Street Gym	W, 79-71
Feb. 13	York	York, Pa.	W, 117-89
Feb. 14	St. Francis	Loretto, Pa.	L, 74-80
Feb. 18	Virginia State	Franklin Street Gym	W, 112-74
Feb. 20	UNC Wilmington	Wilmington, N.C.	W, 104-75
Feb. 22	Virginia Union	Franklin Street Gym	W, 81-76
Feb. 27	Old Dominion	Norfolk, Va.	L, 85-98

== 1971–72 ==
1971–72 NCAA University Division men's basketball independents standings
	Conf.				Overall
Team	W		L	PCT	W		L	PCT
No. 16 Oral Roberts		–		–	26	–	2	.929
No. 7 Marquette		–		–	25	–	4	.862
Hawaii		–		–	23	–	4	.852
No. 12 Marshall		–		–	23	–	4	.852
No. 10 Florida State		–		–	28	–	5	.848
Northern Illinois		–		–	21	–	4	.840
No. 6 South Carolina		–		–	24	–	5	.828
Duquesne		–		–	20	–	5	.800
Syracuse		–		–	22	–	6	.786
Providence		–		–	21	–	6	.778
Detroit		–		–	18	–	6	.750
Houston		–		–	20	–	7	.741
Jacksonville		–		–	20	–	8	.714
No. 15 Villanova		–		–	20	–	8	.714
Pan American		–		–	17	–	7	.708
Niagara		–		–	21	–	9	.700
Penn State		–		–	17	–	8	.680
Fordham		–		–	18	–	9	.667
St. Bonaventure		–		–	16	–	8	.667
Cincinnati		–		–	17	–	9	.654
Georgia Southern		–		–	17	–	9	.654
Colgate		–		–	15	–	8	.652
St. John's		–		–	19	–	11	.633
Fairleigh Dickinson		–		–	15	–	9	.625
Illinois State		–		–	16	–	10	.615
Virginia Tech		–		–	16	–	10	.615
Canisius		–		–	15	–	11	.577
Creighton		–		–	15	–	11	.577
Holy Cross		–		–	15	–	11	.577
Oklahoma City		–		–	16	–	12	.571
Loyola (LA)		–		–	14	–	11	.560
Rutgers		–		–	14	–	11	.560
West Virginia		–		–	13	–	11	.542
Hardin–Simmons		–		–	14	–	12	.538
DePaul		–		–	12	–	11	.522
Centenary		–		–	13	–	12	.520
Long Island		–		–	13	–	12	.520
Boston College		–		–	13	–	13	.500
Dayton		–		–	13	–	13	.500
Pittsburgh		–		–	12	–	12	.500
Air Force		–		–	12	–	13	.480
Fairfield		–		–	12	–	13	.480
Saint Francis (PA)		–		–	12	–	13	.480
Saint Peter's		–		–	12	–	13	.480
Indiana State		–		–	12	–	14	.462
St. Francis (NY)		–		–	12	–	14	.462
Utah State		–		–	12	–	14	.462
Xavier		–		–	12	–	14	.462
Army		–		–	11	–	13	.458
Manhattan		–		–	11	–	13	.458
George Washington		–		–	11	–	14	.440
Navy		–		–	10	–	13	.435
Denver		–		–	11	–	15	.423
Portland		–		–	10	–	16	.385
Seton Hall		–		–	10	–	16	.385
Southern Illinois		–		–	10	–	16	.385
Ball State		–		–	9	–	15	.375
Loyola (IL)		–		–	8	–	14	.364
Tulane		–		–	8	–	18	.308
Boston University		–		–	7	–	16	.304
South Alabama		–		–	7	–	17	.292
Iona		–		–	6	–	17	.261
Butler		–		–	6	–	20	.231
Georgia Tech		–		–	6	–	20	.231
Notre Dame		–		–	6	–	20	.231
Stetson		–		–	6	–	20	.231
Georgetown		–		–	3	–	23	.115
Rankings from AP Poll

Date	Opponent	Location	Result
Dec. 4	James Madison	Franklin Street Gym	W, 93-68
Dec. 6	Wilmington	Franklin Street Gym	W, 102-70
Dec. 9	Missouri	Columbia, Miss.	L, 66-73
Dec. 11	Western Kentucky	Bowling Green, KY	L, 76-85
Dec. 16	Baltimore	Franklin Street Gym	W, 86-76
Dec. 18	Glassboro State	Franklin Street Gym	W, 86-72
Dec. 20	East Tennessee State	Richmond Coliseum	W, 84-71
Jan. 3	St. Francis	Richmond Coliseum	W, 109-94
Jan. 10	Norfolk State	Richmond Coliseum	L, 97-109
Jan. 21	Southeastern	Franklin Street Gym	W, 103-48
Jan. 29	Valparaiso	Franklin Street Gym	W, 86-76
Jan. 31	Virginia Union	Franklin Street Gym	W, 90-85
Feb. 2	Mount St. Mary's	Emmitsburg, Md.	W, 96-65
Feb. 8	Southeastern	Franklin Street Gym	W, 122-73
Feb. 14	Virginia Union	Richmond, Va.	W, 109-94
Feb. 18	Fairleigh Dickinson	Madison, N.J.	L, 86-89 (ot)
Feb. 21	Loyola	Richmond Coliseum	W, 112-99
Mar. 1	Wilmington	Wilmington, N.C.	W, 103-80
Mar. 6	Iona	Richmond Coliseum	W, 93-74

== 1972–73 ==
1972–73 NCAA University Division men's basketball independents standings
	Conf.				Overall
Team	W		L	PCT	W		L	PCT
No. 4 Providence		–		–	27	–	4	.871
No. 5 Marquette		–		–	27	–	4	.871
No. 13 Houston		–		–	23	–	4	.852
No. 14 Syracuse		–		–	24	–	5	.828
Virginia Tech		–		–	22	–	5	.815
Jacksonville		–		–	21	–	6	.778
Oklahoma City		–		–	21	–	6	.778
Oral Roberts		–		–	21	–	6	.778
South Carolina		–		–	22	–	7	.759
Marshall		–		–	20	–	7	.741
Northeastern		–		–	19	–	7	.731
St. John's		–		–	19	–	7	.731
Centenary		–		–	19	–	8	.704
Florida State		–		–	18	–	8	.692
Northern Illinois		–		–	17	–	8	.680
Duquesne		–		–	16	–	8	.667
Fairfield		–		–	18	–	9	.667
Cincinnati		–		–	17	–	9	.654
Denver		–		–	17	–	9	.654
George Washington		–		–	17	–	9	.654
Penn State		–		–	15	–	8	.652
Detroit		–		–	16	–	9	.640
Hardin–Simmons		–		–	16	–	9	.640
Indiana State		–		–	16	–	10	.615
Manhattan		–		–	16	–	10	.615
Utah State		–		–	16	–	10	.615
Notre Dame		–		–	18	–	12	.600
Air Force		–		–	14	–	10	.583
Creighton		–		–	15	–	11	.577
Hawaii		–		–	15	–	11	.577
Rutgers		–		–	15	–	11	.577
Stetson		–		–	15	–	11	.577
DePaul		–		–	14	–	11	.560
South Alabama		–		–	14	–	11	.560
Trinity (TX)		–		–	14	–	11	.560
Canisius		–		–	13	–	11	.542
Butler		–		–	14	–	12	.538
Charlotte		–		–	14	–	12	.538
Illinois State		–		–	13	–	12	.520
Long Island		–		–	13	–	12	.520
Navy		–		–	13	–	12	.520
Dayton		–		–	13	–	13	.500
Fairleigh Dickinson		–		–	13	–	13	.500
St. Bonaventure		–		–	13	–	13	.500
Portland State		–		–	12	–	12	.500
Georgetown		–		–	12	–	14	.462
Pittsburgh		–		–	12	–	14	.462
Tulane		–		–	12	–	14	.462
Army		–		–	11	–	13	.458
Boston College		–		–	11	–	14	.440
Colgate		–		–	11	–	14	.440
Villanova		–		–	11	–	14	.440
Fordham		–		–	12	–	16	.429
Southern Illinois		–		–	11	–	15	.423
West Virginia		–		–	10	–	15	.400
Cleveland State		–		–	9	–	14	.391
Ball State		–		–	9	–	15	.375
Niagara		–		–	9	–	16	.360
Loyola (IL)		–		–	8	–	15	.348
Holy Cross		–		–	9	–	17	.346
Southern Miss		–		–	8	–	16	.333
St. Francis (NY)		–		–	8	–	16	.333
Portland		–		–	9	–	19	.321
Seton Hall		–		–	8	–	17	.320
Georgia Southern		–		–	8	–	18	.308
Saint Peter's		–		–	8	–	18	.308
Georgia Tech		–		–	7	–	18	.280
Iona		–		–	6	–	16	.273
Samford		–		–	5	–	20	.200
Saint Francis (PA)		–		–	5	–	21	.192
Pan American		–		–	4	–	22	.154
Xavier		–		–	3	–	23	.115
Rankings from AP Poll

Date	Opponent	Location	Result
Nov. 27	Wilmington	Franklin Street Gym	W, 94-75
Dec. 4	East Tennessee State	Johnson City, TN	W, 79-69
Dec. 5	Morehead State	Morehead, KY	L, 90-103
Dec. 9	Eastern Kentucky	Richmond, KY	L, 86-96
Dec. 12	Fair. Dickinson	Richmond Coliseum	W, 63-47
Dec. 21	E. Kentucky	Richmond Coliseum	W, 69-63
Jan. 10	West Chester	Richmond Coliseum	W, 87-65
Jan. 13	Wilmington	Wilmington, N.C.	W, 83-75
Jan. 15	Norfolk State	Norfolk, Va.	W, 92-91
Jan. 17	Canisius	Richmond Coliseum	W, 80-66
Jan. 20	Centenary	Shreveport, La.	L, 74-102
Jan. 27	N. Carolina A&T	Richmond Coliseum	W, 79-78
Jan. 30	Northern Illinois	DeKalb, Il.	L, 81-91
Feb. 2	Virginia Union	Franklin Street Gym	L, 75-77
Feb. 7	East Tennessee State	Richmond Coliseum	W, 61-50
Feb. 10	Baltimore	Baltimore, Md.	W, 67-61
Feb. 15	Virginia Union	Richmond, Va.	W, 79-76
Feb. 20	Iona	New Rochelle, N.Y.	W, 81-74
Feb. 24	Brooklyn	Franklin Street Gym	W, 115-70
Feb. 27	Southeastern	Franklin Street Gym	W, 121-70

== 1973–74 ==
1973–74 NCAA Division I men's basketball independents standings
	Conf.				Overall
Team	W		L	PCT	W		L	PCT
No. 5 Notre Dame		–		–	26	–	3	.897
No. 8 Providence		–		–	28	–	4	.875
No. 16 Pittsburgh		–		–	25	–	4	.862
UNC Charlotte		–		–	22	–	4	.846
Centenary		–		–	21	–	4	.840
Marquette		–		–	26	–	5	.839
No. 19 South Carolina		–		–	22	–	5	.815
No. 18 Oral Roberts		–		–	23	–	6	.793
South Alabama		–		–	22	–	6	.786
Creighton		–		–	23	–	7	.767
St. John's		–		–	20	–	7	.741
Georgia Southern		–		–	19	–	7	.731
Southern Illinois		–		–	19	–	7	.731
Syracuse		–		–	19	–	7	.731
VCU		–		–	17	–	7	.708
Cincinnati		–		–	19	–	8	.704
Boston College		–		–	21	–	9	.700
Florida State		–		–	18	–	8	.692
Rutgers		–		–	18	–	8	.692
No. 20 Dayton		–		–	20	–	9	.690
Hawaii		–		–	19	–	9	.679
Jacksonville		–		–	20	–	10	.667
Manhattan		–		–	18	–	9	.667
Mercer		–		–	16	–	8	.667
Detroit		–		–	17	–	9	.654
Fairfield		–		–	17	–	9	.654
Houston		–		–	17	–	9	.654
Illinois State		–		–	17	–	9	.654
Marshall		–		–	17	–	9	.654
St. Bonaventure		–		–	17	–	9	.654
Stetson		–		–	17	–	9	.654
DePaul		–		–	16	–	9	.640
Memphis State		–		–	19	–	11	.633
Northeast Louisiana		–		–	16	–	10	.615
Utah State		–		–	16	–	10	.615
Colgate		–		–	15	–	10	.600
Portland State		–		–	16	–	11	.593
Seton Hall		–		–	16	–	11	.593
Pan American		–		–	13	–	9	.591
George Washington		–		–	15	–	11	.577
Portland		–		–	15	–	11	.577
Saint Francis (PA)		–		–	15	–	11	.577
Ball State		–		–	14	–	12	.538
Butler		–		–	14	–	12	.538
Canisius		–		–	14	–	12	.538
Milwaukee		–		–	14	–	12	.538
Penn State		–		–	14	–	12	.538
Northeastern		–		–	12	–	11	.522
Long Island		–		–	13	–	12	.520
Duquesne		–		–	12	–	12	.500
Georgetown		–		–	13	–	13	.500
Oklahoma City		–		–	13	–	13	.500
Virginia Tech		–		–	13	–	13	.500
Indiana State		–		–	12	–	14	.462
Loyola Chicago		–		–	12	–	14	.462
Niagara		–		–	12	–	14	.462
Tulane		–		–	12	–	14	.462
Air Force		–		–	11	–	13	.458
Iona		–		–	11	–	13	.458
St. Francis (NY)		–		–	11	–	13	.458
Fairleigh Dickinson		–		–	11	–	14	.440
Hardin-Simmons		–		–	11	–	14	.440
South Florida		–		–	11	–	14	.440
Denver		–		–	11	–	15	.423
Southern Mississippi		–		–	11	–	15	.423
Navy		–		–	9	–	13	.409
West Virginia		–		–	10	–	15	.400
Fordham		–		–	8	–	17	.320
Northern Illinois		–		–	8	–	17	.320
Eastern Michigan		–		–	8	–	18	.308
Holy Cross		–		–	8	–	18	.308
Saint Peter's		–		–	8	–	18	.308
Xavier		–		–	8	–	18	.308
Villanova		–		–	7	–	19	.269
Army		–		–	6	–	18	.250
Houston Baptist		–		–	6	–	19	.240
Cleveland State		–		–	6	–	20	.231
Samford		–		–	6	–	20	.231
Buffalo		–		–	5	–	20	.200
Georgia Tech		–		–	5	–	21	.192
Georgia State		–		–	1	–	25	.038
Rankings from AP Poll

Date	Opponent	Location	Result
Dec. 1	East Tennessee State	Richmond Coliseum	W, 96-55
Dec. 4	Morehead State	Richmond Coliseum	W, 116-85
Dec. 8	Northern Illinois	Richmond Coliseum	W, 87-71
Dec. 11	Middle Tennessee	Murfreesboro, TN	L, 80-102
Dec. 15	Canisius	Buffalo, N.Y.	L, 96-103
Dec. 19	Texas A&M	Richmond Coliseum	W, 72-71
Dec. 21	Austin Peay	Richmond Coliseum	L, 101-102 (ot)
Dec. 26	Pacific	Stockton, Calif.	L, 75-80
Dec. 28	Boise State	Boise, ID	W, 87-85
Jan. 4	Mercer	Macon, Ga.	L, 89-90
Jan. 7	Austin Peay	Clarksville, TN	L, 65-81
Jan. 12	Cincinnati	Cincinnati, OH	L, 51-57
Jan. 15	Cornell	Richmond Coliseum	W, 107-64
Jan. 18	St. Mary's	Franklin Street Gym	W, 117-91
Jan. 21	Centenary	Richmond Coliseum	W, 82-79
Jan. 27	Detroit	Detroit, MI	W, 77-70
Jan. 29	Buffalo State	Franklin Street Gym	W, 119-69
Feb. 4	UNC Asheville	Franklin Street Gym	W, 111-70
Feb. 8	NE Illinois	Franklin Street Gym	W, 98-76
Feb. 11	West Florida	Franklin Street Gym	W, 102-64
Feb. 16	Iona	Richmond Coliseum	W, 94-73
Feb. 18	Wilmington	Franklin Street Gym	W, 108-71
Feb. 22	Southeastern	Franklin Street Gym	W, 125-74
Feb. 25	Mercer	Richmond Coliseum	W, 110-92

== 1974–75 ==
1974–75 NCAA Division I men's basketball independents standings
	Conf.				Overall
Team	W		L	PCT	W		L	PCT
Texas–Pan American		–		–	22	–	2	.917
UNC Charlotte		–		–	23	–	3	.885
Centenary (LA)		–		–	25	–	4	.862
No. 11 Marquette		–		–	23	–	4	.852
Stetson		–		–	22	–	4	.846
No. 13 Cincinnati		–		–	23	–	6	.793
Utah State		–		–	21	–	6	.778
Rutgers		–		–	22	–	7	.759
Creighton		–		–	20	–	7	.741
Memphis State		–		–	20	–	7	.741
South Alabama		–		–	19	–	7	.731
No. 6 Syracuse		–		–	23	–	9	.719
Holy Cross		–		–	20	–	8	.714
Oral Roberts		–		–	20	–	8	.714
Boston College		–		–	21	–	9	.700
Florida State		–		–	18	–	8	.692
Portland State		–		–	18	–	8	.692
UC Santa Barbara		–		–	18	–	8	.692
VCU		–		–	17	–	8	.680
South Carolina		–		–	19	–	9	.679
St. John's		–		–	21	–	10	.677
Southern Illinois		–		–	18	–	9	.667
No. 14 Notre Dame		–		–	19	–	10	.655
Detroit		–		–	17	–	9	.654
No. 20 Providence		–		–	20	–	11	.645
Georgetown		–		–	18	–	10	.643
George Washington		–		–	17	–	10	.630
Pittsburgh		–		–	18	–	11	.621
Houston		–		–	16	–	10	.615
Illinois State		–		–	16	–	10	.615
Tulane		–		–	16	–	10	.615
Virginia Tech		–		–	16	–	10	.615
Canisius		–		–	15	–	10	.600
DePaul		–		–	15	–	10	.600
Northeast Louisiana		–		–	15	–	10	.600
South Florida		–		–	15	–	10	.600
Seton Hall		–		–	16	–	11	.593
Jacksonville		–		–	15	–	11	.577
Duquesne		–		–	14	–	11	.560
Hawaii		–		–	14	–	11	.560
Saint Peter's		–		–	15	–	12	.556
Cleveland State		–		–	13	–	11	.542
Manhattan		–		–	14	–	12	.538
Air Force		–		–	13	–	12	.520
LIU		–		–	13	–	12	.520
St. Bonaventure		–		–	14	–	13	.519
West Virginia		–		–	14	–	13	.519
Cal State Los Angeles		–		–	13	–	13	.500
Marshall		–		–	13	–	13	.500
Navy		–		–	12	–	12	.500
Northeastern		–		–	12	–	12	.500
Fairfield		–		–	13	–	14	.481
Niagara		–		–	13	–	14	.481
Fordham		–		–	12	–	13	.480
Penn State		–		–	11	–	12	.478
Indiana State		–		–	12	–	14	.462
Oklahoma City		–		–	12	–	14	.462
Saint Louis		–		–	12	–	14	.462
Fairleigh Dickinson		–		–	11	–	13	.458
Portland		–		–	13	–	16	.448
Saint Francis (PA)		–		–	11	–	14	.440
Georgia Tech		–		–	11	–	15	.423
Southern Miss		–		–	11	–	15	.423
Xavier		–		–	11	–	15	.423
Ball State		–		–	10	–	15	.400
Loyola-Chicago		–		–	10	–	15	.400
Butler		–		–	10	–	16	.385
Dayton		–		–	10	–	16	.385
Denver		–		–	9	–	16	.360
Northern Illinois		–		–	8	–	15	.348
Houston Baptist		–		–	9	–	17	.346
Mercer		–		–	9	–	17	.346
Samford		–		–	9	–	17	.346
Colgate		–		–	8	–	16	.333
Villanova		–		–	9	–	18	.333
Buffalo		–		–	8	–	17	.320
Georgia Southern		–		–	8	–	18	.308
Georgia State		–		–	8	–	18	.308
Wisconsin-Milwaukee		–		–	8	–	18	.308
St. Francis (NY)		–		–	7	–	19	.269
Baptist		–		–	4	–	16	.200
Hardin-Simmons		–		–	5	–	20	.200
Iona		–		–	4	–	19	.174
Army		–		–	3	–	22	.120
Rankings from AP Poll

Date	Opponent	Location	Result
Nov. 30	Iowa	Iowa City, IA	L, 80-95
Dec. 2	Wilmington	Franklin Street Gym	W, 104-96
Dec. 5	Hardin-Simmons	Richmond Coliseum	W, 112-74
Dec. 7	Baylor	Waco, TX	L, 81-83
Dec. 9	Hardin-Simmons	Abilene, TX	W, 84-71
Dec. 10	Texas A&M	College Station, TX	L, 84-98
Dec. 17	Centenary	Richmond Coliseum	W, 76-75
Dec. 19	NE Louisiana	Franklin Street Gym	W, 83-75
Dec. 21	Buffalo	Richmond Coliseum	W, 105-73
Dec. 28	St. Peter's - Lions-VCU; Holiday Tournament	Richmond Coliseum	W, 86-68
Dec. 29	Texas A&M - Lions-VCU; Holiday Tournament	Richmond Coliseum	L, 80-84
Jan. 8	Baptist (S.C.)	Franklin Street Gym	W, 116-79
Jan. 11	Maine	Orono, ME	L, 90-91
Jan. 15	MD-Eastern Shore	Richmond Coliseum	W, 89-57
Jan. 21	St. Mary's	Franklin Street Gym	W, 120-60
Jan. 25	Western Illinois	Franklin Street Gym	W, 99-83
Jan. 27	Centenary	Shreveport, La.	L, 66-73
Feb. 8	Mercer	Richmond Coliseum	W, 95-75
Feb. 11	Delaware State	Franklin Street Gym	W, 91-60
Feb. 15	Elmira	Franklin Street Gym	W, 113-75
Feb. 17	Md.- Eastern Shore	Princess Anne, Md.	W, 85-75
Feb. 22	Mercer	Macon, Ga.	W, 68-63
Feb. 24	Canisius	Richmond Coliseum	W, 86-61
Feb. 28	Detroit	Richmond Coliseum	L, 58-67
Mar. 3	Auburn	Auburn, Ala.	L, 72-117

== 1975–76 ==
1975–76 NCAA Division I men's basketball independents standings
	Conf.				Overall
Team	W		L	PCT	W		L	PCT
No. 4 Rutgers		–		–	31	–	2	.939
No. 3 UNLV		–		–	29	–	2	.935
No. 2 Marquette		–		–	27	–	2	.931
North Texas State		–		–	22	–	4	.846
No. 19 Centenary		–		–	22	–	5	.815
UNC Charlotte		–		–	24	–	6	.800
Pan American		–		–	20	–	5	.800
No. 7 Notre Dame		–		–	23	–	6	.793
St. John's		–		–	23	–	6	.793
Florida State		–		–	21	–	6	.778
Oral Roberts		–		–	20	–	6	.769
Georgetown		–		–	21	–	7	.750
Virginia Tech		–		–	21	–	7	.750
George Washington		–		–	20	–	7	.741
Illinois State		–		–	20	–	7	.741
Creighton		–		–	19	–	7	.731
Northeast Louisiana		–		–	18	–	7	.720
Detroit		–		–	19	–	8	.704
South Florida		–		–	19	–	8	.704
New Orleans		–		–	18	–	8	.692
No. 17 DePaul		–		–	20	–	9	.690
Syracuse		–		–	20	–	9	.690
Holy Cross		–		–	22	–	10	.688
Seton Hall		–		–	18	–	9	.667
South Alabama		–		–	18	–	9	.667
South Carolina		–		–	18	–	9	.667
Providence		–		–	21	–	11	.656
Stetson		–		–	17	–	9	.654
UC Santa Barbara		–		–	17	–	9	.654
Air Force		–		–	16	–	9	.640
VCU		–		–	16	–	9	.640
St. Peter's		–		–	19	–	11	.633
Portland State		–		–	17	–	10	.630
St. Bonaventure		–		–	17	–	10	.630
Mercer		–		–	15	–	10	.600
Villanova		–		–	16	–	11	.593
Niagara		–		–	17	–	12	.586
Long Island		–		–	15	–	12	.556
Colgate		–		–	13	–	11	.542
Xavier		–		–	14	–	12	.538
West Virginia		–		–	15	–	13	.536
Georgia State		–		–	12	–	11	.522
Indiana State		–		–	13	–	12	.520
Dayton		–		–	14	–	13	.519
Hardin–Simmons		–		–	14	–	13	.519
Jacksonville		–		–	13	–	13	.500
Manhattan		–		–	14	–	14	.500
St. Francis (PA)		–		–	14	–	14	.500
St. Francis (NY)		–		–	13	–	13	.500
Marshall		–		–	13	–	14	.481
Duquesne		–		–	12	–	13	.480
Northeastern		–		–	12	–	13	.480
Fairfield		–		–	12	–	14	.462
Utah State		–		–	12	–	14	.462
Butler		–		–	12	–	15	.444
Denver		–		–	12	–	15	.444
Pittsburgh		–		–	12	–	15	.444
Army		–		–	11	–	14	.440
Iona		–		–	11	–	15	.423
Milwaukee		–		–	11	–	15	.423
Southern Miss		–		–	11	–	15	.423
Navy		–		–	10	–	14	.417
Fairleigh Dickinson		–		–	9	–	13	.409
Georgia Southern		–		–	11	–	16	.407
Hawaii		–		–	11	–	16	.407
Penn State		–		–	10	–	15	.400
Buffalo		–		–	10	–	16	.385
Loyola (IL)		–		–	10	–	16	.385
Canisius		–		–	10	–	17	.370
Boston College		–		–	9	–	17	.346
Oklahoma City		–		–	9	–	18	.333
Portland		–		–	9	–	18	.333
Fordham		–		–	7	–	19	.269
Cleveland State		–		–	6	–	19	.240
Houston Baptist		–		–	5	–	21	.192
Baptist		–		–	3	–	23	.115
Samford		–		–	3	–	23	.115
Rankings from AP Poll

Date	Opponent	Location	Result
Nov. 29	Baltimore	Franklin Street Gym	W, 84-78
Dec. 1	Wilmington	Franklin Street Gym	W, 99-75
Dec. 9	Southern Illinois	Carbondale, Il.	L, 69-79
Dec. 13	Baylor	Richmond Coliseum	W, 68-64
Dec. 16	Centenary	Shreveport, La.	L, 69-94
Dec. 18	Georgia State	Atlanta, Ga.	L, 56-57
Dec. 20	Northeastern	Richmond Coliseum	W, 102-81
Dec. 29	CCNY - VCU-Holiday Tournament	Richmond Coliseum	W, 115-70
Dec. 30	Michigan State - VCU-Holiday Tournament	Richmond Coliseum	W, 80-75
Jan. 3	Memphis State	Memphis, TN	L, 72-92
Jan. 13	Western Illinois	Macomb, Il.	W, 83-81
Jan. 16	MD-Eastern Shore	Richmond Coliseum	W, 92-68
Jan. 19	Brockport State	Franklin Street Gym	W, 102-71
Jan. 24	North Texas State	Denton, TX	L, 72-89
Jan. 26	Oral Roberts	Tulsa, OK	L, 68-84
Jan. 29	Richmond	Richmond, Va.	L, 65-71
Jan. 31	Oklahoma City	Richmond Coliseum	W, 67-66
Feb. 3	Charles. Baptist	Franklin Street Gym	W, 120-61
Feb. 6	Maine	Franklin Street Gym	W, 92-82
Feb. 10	Richmond	Richmond Coliseum	L, 66-68
Feb. 17	Brockport State	Brockport, N.Y.	W, 104-99 (ot)
Feb. 18	Buffalo	Buffalo, N.Y.	W, 97-78
Feb. 21	Delaware State	Franklin Street Gym	W, 105-75
Mar. 1	Centenary	Richmond Coliseum	L, 94-98
Mar. 4	Bentley	Franklin Street Gym	W, 96-56

== 1976–77 ==
1976–77 NCAA Division I men's basketball independents standings
	Conf.				Overall
Team	W		L	PCT	W		L	PCT
No. 4 UNLV		–		–	29	–	3	.906
Indiana State		–		–	25	–	3	.893
No. 6 Syracuse		–		–	26	–	4	.867
No. 12 Detroit		–		–	25	–	4	.862
Old Dominion		–		–	25	–	4	.862
Providence		–		–	24	–	5	.828
Holy Cross		–		–	23	–	6	.793
St. Bonaventure		–		–	23	–	6	.793
No. 7 Marquette		–		–	25	–	7	.781
North Texas State		–		–	21	–	6	.778
Illinois State		–		–	22	–	7	.759
No. 10 Notre Dame		–		–	22	–	7	.759
Creighton		–		–	21	–	7	.750
Oral Roberts		–		–	21	–	7	.750
Army		–		–	20	–	8	.714
St. John's		–		–	22	–	9	.710
Milwaukee		–		–	19	–	8	.704
Georgetown		–		–	19	–	9	.679
Virginia Tech		–		–	19	–	10	.655
James Madison		–		–	17	–	9	.654
Northwestern State		–		–	17	–	9	.654
Texas–Pan American		–		–	17	–	9	.654
Connecticut		–		–	17	–	10	.630
Seton Hall		–		–	18	–	11	.621
UNC Wilmington		–		–	16	–	10	.615
Portland State		–		–	16	–	10	.615
Iona		–		–	15	–	10	.600
Dayton		–		–	16	–	11	.593
Fairfield		–		–	16	–	11	.593
Georgia Southern		–		–	16	–	11	.593
Richmond		–		–	15	–	11	.577
Saint Francis (PA)		–		–	15	–	11	.577
DePaul		–		–	15	–	12	.556
Northeast Louisiana		–		–	15	–	12	.556
Stetson		–		–	15	–	12	.556
Utah State		–		–	15	–	12	.556
Colgate		–		–	13	–	11	.542
Navy		–		–	13	–	11	.542
Oklahoma City		–		–	14	–	12	.538
South Carolina		–		–	14	–	12	.538
Valparaiso		–		–	13	–	12	.520
Catholic		–		–	13	–	13	.500
Fairleigh Dickinson		–		–	13	–	13	.500
Loyola (IL)		–		–	13	–	13	.500
Maine		–		–	13	–	13	.500
Niagara		–		–	13	–	13	.500
Rhode Island		–		–	13	–	13	.500
Saint Peter's		–		–	13	–	13	.500
VCU		–		–	13	–	13	.500
Butler		–		–	13	–	14	.481
Manhattan		–		–	13	–	14	.481
New Hampshire		–		–	12	–	14	.462
Northeastern		–		–	12	–	14	.462
St. Francis (NY)		–		–	12	–	14	.462
Air Force		–		–	12	–	15	.444
Denver		–		–	12	–	15	.444
Southern Mississippi		–		–	11	–	16	.407
Siena		–		–	9	–	15	.375
Cleveland State		–		–	10	–	17	.370
Xavier		–		–	10	–	17	.370
Centenary (LA)		–		–	11	–	19	.367
Long Island		–		–	9	–	16	.360
Hawaii		–		–	9	–	18	.333
[[{{{school}}}|Western Carolina]]		–		–	8	–	16	.333
Vermont		–		–	8	–	17	.320
Boston College		–		–	8	–	18	.308
Baptist		–		–	8	–	19	.296
Marshall		–		–	8	–	19	.296
Boston University		–		–	7	–	19	.269
Robert Morris		–		–	7	–	19	.269
Samford		–		–	7	–	19	.269
Mercer		–		–	6	–	19	.240
Hardin–Simmons		–		–	6	–	21	.222
Houston Baptist		–		–	6	–	23	.207
Buffalo		–		–	5	–	21	.192
Fordham		–		–	5	–	21	.192
Wagner		–		–	3	–	21	.125
Canisius		–		–	3	–	22	.120
Rankings from AP Poll

Date	Opponent	Location	Result
Nov. 29	North Carolina A&T	Richmond Coliseum	W, 86-57
Dec. 1	South Carolina State	Franklin Street Gym	W, 78–70
Dec. 4	Richmond	Richmond Coliseum	L, 66–68 (ot)
Dec. 6	Louisville	Louisville, Ky.	L, 60–89
Dec. 11	Middle Tennessee	Richmond Coliseum	L, 50–59
Dec. 13	Southeastern	Franklin Street Gym	W, 87–67
Dec. 16	Auburn	Richmond Coliseum	L, 59–109
Dec. 18	Georgia Southern	Richmond Coliseum	W, 70–65
Dec. 29	Virginia – Times-Dispatch Invitational	Richmond Coliseum	L, 58–65
Dec. 30	Richmond – Times-Dispatch Invitational	Richmond Coliseum	L, 55–58
Jan. 3	Western Carolina	Cullowhee, Nc.	W, 79–66
Jan. 12	Methodist	Franklin Street Gym	W, 81–64
Jan. 18	Boston University	Boston, Ma.	L, 72–77
Jan. 22	Georgia State	Richmond Coliseum	W, 72–56
Jan. 27	Tulsa	Tulsa, Ok.	L, 60–66
Jan. 29	Oral Roberts	Tulsa, Ok.	L, 52–72
Feb. 5	Wright State	Richmond Coliseum	W, 82–70
Feb. 7	Western Carolina	Richmond Coliseum	W, 69–63
Feb. 12	Delaware State	Franklin Street Gym	W, 78–52
Feb. 14	South Alabama	Mobile, Al.	L, 76–78
Feb. 17	Robert Morris	Franklin Street Gym	W, 97–70
Feb. 19	Georgia Southern	Statesboro, Ga.	L, 81–88
Feb. 23	South Alabama	Richmond Coliseum	W, 85–70 (ot)
Feb. 26	Richmond	Richmond, Va.	L, 75–78 (ot)
Mar. 1	Liberty	Franklin Street Gym	W, 85–74
Mar. 4	UNC Charlotte	Charlotte, Nc.	L, 72–87

== 1977–78 ==
1977–78 NCAA Division I men's basketball independents standings
	Conf.				Overall
Team	W		L	PCT	W		L	PCT
No. 3 DePaul		–		–	27	–	3	.900
No. 18 Detroit		–		–	25	–	4	.862
Illinois State		–		–	24	–	4	.857
No. 8 Marquette		–		–	24	–	4	.857
Pan American		–		–	22	–	4	.846
VCU		–		–	24	–	5	.828
Fairfield		–		–	22	–	5	.815
North Texas State		–		–	22	–	6	.786
Syracuse		–		–	22	–	6	.786
Rhode Island		–		–	24	–	7	.774
Providence		–		–	24	–	8	.750
St. John's		–		–	21	–	7	.750
Utah State		–		–	21	–	7	.750
Georgetown		–		–	23	–	8	.742
No. 6 Notre Dame		–		–	23	–	8	.742
Holy Cross		–		–	20	–	7	.741
Northeast Louisiana		–		–	20	–	7	.741
UNC Wilmington		–		–	19	–	7	.731
St. Bonaventure		–		–	21	–	8	.724
UNLV		–		–	20	–	8	.714
Virginia Tech		–		–	19	–	8	.704
James Madison		–		–	18	–	8	.692
Maine		–		–	17	–	8	.680
Army		–		–	19	–	9	.679
Dayton		–		–	19	–	10	.655
St. Francis (NY)		–		–	16	–	9	.640
Iona		–		–	17	–	10	.630
William & Mary		–		–	16	–	10	.615
Air Force		–		–	15	–	10	.600
Loyola (IL)		–		–	16	–	11	.593
Mercer		–		–	16	–	11	.593
Oklahoma City		–		–	16	–	11	.593
Seton Hall		–		–	16	–	11	.593
Boston College		–		–	15	–	11	.577
Butler		–		–	15	–	11	.577
Saint Francis (PA)		–		–	15	–	11	.577
South Carolina		–		–	16	–	12	.571
Siena		–		–	13	–	10	.565
Navy		–		–	14	–	11	.560
Milwaukee		–		–	15	–	12	.556
Niagara		–		–	14	–	12	.538
Northeastern		–		–	14	–	12	.538
Southern Mississippi		–		–	13	–	12	.520
Portland State		–		–	14	–	13	.519
Stetson		–		–	14	–	13	.519
Oral Roberts		–		–	13	–	14	.481
Xavier		–		–	13	–	14	.481
Cleveland State		–		–	12	–	13	.480
Tennessee State		–		–	11	–	12	.478
Catholic		–		–	12	–	14	.462
Manhattan		–		–	12	–	14	.462
Georgia Southern		–		–	12	–	15	.444
Northwestern State		–		–	12	–	15	.444
Connecticut		–		–	11	–	15	.423
Old Dominion		–		–	11	–	15	.423
Vermont		–		–	11	–	15	.423
Boston University		–		–	10	–	15	.400
Hardin–Simmons		–		–	10	–	16	.385
Campbell		–		–	9	–	15	.375
Centenary (LA)		–		–	10	–	17	.370
Denver		–		–	10	–	17	.370
Colgate		–		–	9	–	17	.346
East Carolina		–		–	9	–	17	.346
Fordham		–		–	8	–	18	.308
Long Island		–		–	8	–	18	.308
Saint Peter's		–		–	8	–	18	.308
Baptist		–		–	8	–	19	.296
Samford		–		–	8	–	19	.296
Canisius		–		–	7	–	19	.269
Houston Baptist		–		–	7	–	19	.269
New Hampshire		–		–	7	–	19	.269
Wagner		–		–	7	–	19	.269
Evansville		–		–	1	–	3	.250
Fairleigh Dickinson		–		–	6	–	18	.250
Valparaiso		–		–	6	–	19	.240
Robert Morris		–		–	4	–	19	.174
Richmond		–		–	4	–	22	.154
Hawaii		–		–	1	–	26	.037
Rankings from AP Poll

== 1978–79 ==
1978–79 NCAA Division I men's basketball independents standings
	Conf.				Overall
Team	W		L	PCT	W		L	PCT
No. 8 Syracuse		–		–	26	–	4	.867
Georgetown		–		–	24	–	5	.828
No. 6 DePaul		–		–	26	–	6	.813
No. 4 Notre Dame		–		–	24	–	6	.800
VCU		–		–	20	–	5	.800
Iona		–		–	23	–	6	.793
Detroit		–		–	22	–	6	.786
[[{{{school}}}|Tennessee State]]		–		–	20	–	6	.769
Old Dominion		–		–	23	–	7	.767
No. 10 Marquette		–		–	22	–	7	.759
[[{{{school}}}|Wagner]]		–		–	21	–	7	.750
Connecticut		–		–	21	–	8	.724
[[{{{school}}}|UNLV]]		–		–	21	–	8	.724
UNC Wilmington		–		–	19	–	8	.704
Boston College		–		–	21	–	9	.700
James Madison		–		–	18	–	8	.692
Rhode Island		–		–	20	–	9	.690
[[{{{school}}}|George Mason]]		–		–	17	–	8	.680
St. Bonaventure		–		–	19	–	9	.679
Illinois State		–		–	20	–	10	.667
St. John's		–		–	21	–	11	.656
Dayton		–		–	19	–	10	.655
[[{{{school}}}|Boston University]]		–		–	17	–	9	.654
Fairfield		–		–	17	–	9	.654
Georgia Tech		–		–	17	–	9	.654
Oral Roberts		–		–	17	–	10	.630
Holy Cross		–		–	17	–	11	.607
Seton Hall		–		–	16	–	11	.593
Cleveland State		–		–	15	–	10	.600
[[{{{school}}}|East Tennessee State]]		–		–	16	–	11	.593
Maine		–		–	14	–	10	.583
UAB		–		–	15	–	11	.577
Army		–		–	14	–	11	.560
Denver		–		–	15	–	12	.556
South Carolina		–		–	15	–	12	.556
Stetson		–		–	15	–	12	.556
[[{{{school}}}|Siena]]		–		–	14	–	12	.538
[[{{{school}}}|St. Francis (NY)]]		–		–	14	–	12	.538
Navy		–		–	13	–	12	.520
Xavier		–		–	14	–	13	.519
Northeastern		–		–	13	–	13	.500
Saint Francis (PA)		–		–	13	–	13	.500
[[{{{school}}}|Robert Morris]]		–		–	13	–	14	.481
Southern Miss		–		–	13	–	14	.481
Air Force		–		–	12	–	13	.480
[[{{{school}}}|Long Island University]]		–		–	12	–	13	.480
Canisius		–		–	12	–	14	.462
Colgate		–		–	12	–	14	.462
[[{{{school}}}|Evansville]]		–		–	13	–	16	.448
[[{{{school}}}|East Carolina]]		–		–	12	–	15	.444
Loyola-Chicago		–		–	12	–	15	.444
Butler		–		–	11	–	16	.407
North Texas State		–		–	11	–	16	.407
Saint Peter's		–		–	10	–	15	.400
[[{{{school}}}|Campbell]]		–		–	10	–	16	.385
[[{{{school}}}|New Hampshire]]		–		–	10	–	16	.385
Providence		–		–	10	–	16	.385
Richmond		–		–	10	–	16	.385
Hawaii		–		–	10	–	17	.370
William & Mary		–		–	9	–	17	.346
Georgia Southern		–		–	9	–	18	.333
Fairleigh Dickinson		–		–	8	–	18	.308
Wisconsin-Milwaukee		–		–	8	–	18	.308
[[{{{school}}}|Vermont]]		–		–	8	–	18	.308
Northwestern State		–		–	7	–	19	.269
Fordham		–		–	7	–	22	.241
[[{{{school}}}|Catholic]]		–		–	6	–	20	.231
[[{{{school}}}|Arkansas-Little Rock]]		–		–	6	–	20	.231
Manhattan		–		–	6	–	20	.231
Niagara		–		–	6	–	20	.231
Portland State		–		–	6	–	21	.222
[[{{{school}}}|Baltimore]]		–		–	4	–	20	.167
Valparaiso		–		–	4	–	21	.160
Baptist		–		–	2	–	25	.074
Rankings from AP Poll

== NBA Draft selections ==
#	Year	Round	Pick	Overall	Name	Team	Position
1	1974	2	14	32	Jesse Dark	New York Knickerbockers	Point guard
2	1974	4	9	63	Bernie Harris	Buffalo Braves	Small forward
3	1979	3	20	64	Gerald Henderson	San Antonio Spurs	Point guard
