= 1974–75 Illinois State Redbirds men's basketball team =

American college basketball season

1974–75 Illinois State Redbirds men's basketball
- Conference: Independent
- Record: 16–10
- Head coach: Will Robinson (5th season)
- Assistant coaches: Warren Crews; Bill Flanagan; Gene Smithson
- Home arena: Horton Field House

1974–75 NCAA Division I men's basketball independents standings
	Conf.				Overall
Team	W		L	PCT	W		L	PCT
Texas–Pan American		–		–	22	–	2	.917
UNC Charlotte		–		–	23	–	3	.885
Centenary (LA)		–		–	25	–	4	.862
No. 11 Marquette		–		–	23	–	4	.852
Stetson		–		–	22	–	4	.846
No. 13 Cincinnati		–		–	23	–	6	.793
Utah State		–		–	21	–	6	.778
Rutgers		–		–	22	–	7	.759
Creighton		–		–	20	–	7	.741
Memphis State		–		–	20	–	7	.741
South Alabama		–		–	19	–	7	.731
No. 6 Syracuse		–		–	23	–	9	.719
Holy Cross		–		–	20	–	8	.714
Oral Roberts		–		–	20	–	8	.714
Boston College		–		–	21	–	9	.700
Florida State		–		–	18	–	8	.692
Portland State		–		–	18	–	8	.692
UC Santa Barbara		–		–	18	–	8	.692
VCU		–		–	17	–	8	.680
South Carolina		–		–	19	–	9	.679
St. John's		–		–	21	–	10	.677
Southern Illinois		–		–	18	–	9	.667
No. 14 Notre Dame		–		–	19	–	10	.655
Detroit		–		–	17	–	9	.654
No. 20 Providence		–		–	20	–	11	.645
Georgetown		–		–	18	–	10	.643
George Washington		–		–	17	–	10	.630
Pittsburgh		–		–	18	–	11	.621
Houston		–		–	16	–	10	.615
Illinois State		–		–	16	–	10	.615
Tulane		–		–	16	–	10	.615
Virginia Tech		–		–	16	–	10	.615
Canisius		–		–	15	–	10	.600
DePaul		–		–	15	–	10	.600
Northeast Louisiana		–		–	15	–	10	.600
South Florida		–		–	15	–	10	.600
Seton Hall		–		–	16	–	11	.593
Jacksonville		–		–	15	–	11	.577
Duquesne		–		–	14	–	11	.560
Hawaii		–		–	14	–	11	.560
Saint Peter's		–		–	15	–	12	.556
Cleveland State		–		–	13	–	11	.542
Manhattan		–		–	14	–	12	.538
Air Force		–		–	13	–	12	.520
LIU		–		–	13	–	12	.520
St. Bonaventure		–		–	14	–	13	.519
West Virginia		–		–	14	–	13	.519
Cal State Los Angeles		–		–	13	–	13	.500
Marshall		–		–	13	–	13	.500
Navy		–		–	12	–	12	.500
Northeastern		–		–	12	–	12	.500
Fairfield		–		–	13	–	14	.481
Niagara		–		–	13	–	14	.481
Fordham		–		–	12	–	13	.480
Penn State		–		–	11	–	12	.478
Indiana State		–		–	12	–	14	.462
Oklahoma City		–		–	12	–	14	.462
Saint Louis		–		–	12	–	14	.462
Fairleigh Dickinson		–		–	11	–	13	.458
Portland		–		–	13	–	16	.448
Saint Francis (PA)		–		–	11	–	14	.440
Georgia Tech		–		–	11	–	15	.423
Southern Miss		–		–	11	–	15	.423
Xavier		–		–	11	–	15	.423
Ball State		–		–	10	–	15	.400
Loyola-Chicago		–		–	10	–	15	.400
Butler		–		–	10	–	16	.385
Dayton		–		–	10	–	16	.385
Denver		–		–	9	–	16	.360
Northern Illinois		–		–	8	–	15	.348
Houston Baptist		–		–	9	–	17	.346
Mercer		–		–	9	–	17	.346
Samford		–		–	9	–	17	.346
Colgate		–		–	8	–	16	.333
Villanova		–		–	9	–	18	.333
Buffalo		–		–	8	–	17	.320
Georgia Southern		–		–	8	–	18	.308
Georgia State		–		–	8	–	18	.308
Wisconsin-Milwaukee		–		–	8	–	18	.308
St. Francis (NY)		–		–	7	–	19	.269
Baptist		–		–	4	–	16	.200
Hardin-Simmons		–		–	5	–	20	.200
Iona		–		–	4	–	19	.174
Army		–		–	3	–	22	.120
Rankings from AP Poll

The 1974–75 Illinois State Redbirds men's basketball team represented Illinois State University during the 1974–75 NCAA Division I men's basketball season. The Redbirds, led by fifth-year head coach Will Robinson, played their home games at Horton Field House in Normal, Illinois and competed as an independent (not a member of a conference). They finished the season 16–10.

== Roster ==
1974–75 Illinois State Redbirds men's basketball team
Players
Coaches

Pos.	#	Name	Height	Weight	Year	Hometown
F	33	Calvin Harper	6 ft 7 in (2.01 m)	230 lb (104 kg)	Sr	Detroit, MI
C	11	Darrell Jeter	6 ft 7 in (2.01 m)	200 lb (91 kg)	Sr	Detroit, MI
G	22	Rick Whitlow	6 ft 2 in (1.88 m)	180 lb (82 kg)	Sr	Michigan City, IN
G	23	Mike Bonczyk	5 ft 10 in (1.78 m)	170 lb (77 kg)	Jr	South Holland, IL
F	21	Robert Hawkins	6 ft 4 in (1.93 m)	190 lb (86 kg)	Jr	Detroit, MI
C	42	Randy Henry	6 ft 8 in (2.03 m)	185 lb (84 kg)	Jr	Detroit, MI
F	35	Richard Jones	6 ft 3 in (1.91 m)	190 lb (86 kg)	Jr	York, AL
F	43	Roger Powell	6 ft 5 in (1.96 m)	193 lb (88 kg)	Jr	Joliet, IL
G	13	George Tometich	6 ft 2 in (1.88 m)	170 lb (77 kg)	Jr	Moline, IL
F	24	John Crossen	6 ft 6 in (1.98 m)	200 lb (91 kg)	So	St. Clair Shores, MI
F	34	Jeff Widdel	6 ft 6 in (1.98 m)	205 lb (93 kg)	So	Rock Island, IL
C	45	Jeff Wilkins	7 ft 0 in (2.13 m)	240 lb (109 kg)	So	Chicago, IL
F	25	Billy Lewis	6 ft 6 in (1.98 m)	180 lb (82 kg)	Fr	Chicago, IL
C	44	Cyrus Mann	6 ft 10 in (2.08 m)	210 lb (95 kg)	Fr	Detroit, MI

Head coach

- Will Robinson (West Virginia State)

Assistant coach(es)

- Warren Crews (Southeast Missouri State)
- Bill Flanagan (Monmouth (IL))
- Gene Smithson (North Central (IL))

Legend

- (C) Team captain
- (S) Suspended
- (I) Ineligible
- (W) Walk-on
- Injured
- Current redshirt

Roster
Last update: January 26, 2021

== Schedule ==
Date time, TV	Rank^{#}	Opponent^{#}	Result	Record	High points	High rebounds	High assists	Site (attendance) city, state
Exhibition Season
November 12, 1974*; 7:30 pm		Czechoslovakia National Team	W 107–93		33 – Whitlow	8 – Hawkins	–	Horton Field House; Normal, IL
Regular Season
November 30, 1974*; 8:15 pm		at Saint Louis	L 81–83 ^{OT}	0–1	–	–	–	Kiel Auditorium; St. Louis, MO
December 3, 1974*; 6:30 pm		at Florida State	L 70–72	0–2	–	–	–	Bobby Tully Gymnasium (3,500); Tallahassee, FL
December 7, 1974*; 8:00 pm, WRAU		Drake	W 92–79	1–2	22 – Whitlow	12 – Hawkins	–	Horton Field House; Normal, IL
December 11, 1974*		at Butler	L 78–79	1–3	19 – Whitlow	–	–	Hinkle Fieldhouse; Indianapolis, IN
December 14, 1974*		Louisiana Tech	W 109–81	2–3	18 – Powell	12 – Lewis	–	Horton Field House (4,500); Normal, IL
December 21, 1974*		at Nevada–Las Vegas	L 88–99	2–4	–	–	–	Las Vegas Convention Center; Winchester, NV
December 26, 1974*		California State–San Francisco	W 102–57	3–4	–	–	–	Horton Field House; Normal, IL
December 28, 1974*		Fairleigh Dickinson	W 72–68	4–4	–	–	–	Horton Field House; Normal, IL
January 4, 1975*; 8:00 pm, WRAU		Southern Illinois	W 91–84 ^{OT}	5–4	51 – Whitlow	–	–	Horton Field House; Normal, IL
January 6, 1975*; 8:00 pm, WRAU		Oral Roberts	W 107–98	6–4	–	–	–	Horton Field House; Normal, IL
January 9, 1975*		at Bradley	L 85–106	6–5	–	–	–	Robertson Memorial Field House; Peoria, IL
January 11, 1975*		at Pacific	L 76–82	6–6	27 – Wilkins	11 – Wilkins	14 – Bonczyk	Pacific Pavilion; Stockton, CA
January 16, 1975*		at South Alabama	L 88–90	6–7	–	–	–	Jaguar Gymnasium; Mobile, AL
January 18, 1975*		Oakland	W 98–53	7–7	23 – Whitlow	–	12 – Bonczyk	Horton Field House (6,200); Normal, IL
January 22, 1975*		at Marshall	W 80–77	8–7	22 – Whitlow	–	–	Veterans Memorial Fieldhouse; Huntington, WV
January 25, 1975*; 7:30 pm		Northern Illinois	W 102–79	9–7	34 – Whitlow	8 – Hawkins	23 – Bonczyk	Horton Field House; Normal, IL
January 29, 1975*		at Southern Illinois	L 61–91	9–8	22 – Mann	–	–	SIU Arena (7,349); Carbondale, IL
February 1, 1975*		at Central Michigan	L 82–93	9–9	–	–	–	Daniel P. Rose Center (5,490); Mount Pleasant, MI
February 3, 1975*		South Alabama	W 104–86	10–9	30 – Hawkins	12 – Lewis	–	Horton Field House; Normal, IL
February 8, 1975*		at Ball State	L 65–77	10–10	25 – Hawkins	–	–	Irving Gymnasium; Muncie, IN
February 12, 1975*		Western Illinois	W 104–69	11–10	29 – Whitlow	9 – Mann	6 – Powell, Tometich	Horton Field House; Normal, IL
February 15, 1975*; 7:30 pm		at Northern Illinois	W 107–78	12–10	23 – Wilkins	–	7 – Bonczyk	Chick Evans Field House (2,182); DeKalb, IL
February 18, 1975*; 8:15 pm		at Wisconsin–Milwaukee	W 100–62	13–10	23 – Wilkins	20 – Whitlow	–	MECCA Arena; Milwaukee, WI
February 22, 1975*; 7:30 pm		Lewis	W 129–80	14–10	24 – Lewis	12 – Lewis	–	Horton Field House (3,200); Normal, IL
February 26, 1975*		Indiana State	W 99–91	15–10	26 – Whitlow	–	–	Horton Field House (6,200); Normal, IL
March 1, 1975*		at West Virginia	W 105–99	16–10	31 – Whitlow	11 – Lewis	–	WVU Coliseum; Morgantown, WV
*Non-conference game. ^{#}Rankings from AP Poll. (#) Tournament seedings in parentheses. All times are in Central Standard Time.
