= 1974–75 Georgetown Hoyas men's basketball team =

American college basketball season

1974–75 Georgetown Hoyas men's basketball

ECAC South Region tournament champions

NCAA tournament, First Round
- Conference: Independent
- Record: 18–10
- Head coach: John Thompson (3rd season)
- Assistant coaches: Bill Stein (3rd season); Dwight Datcher (1st season)
- Captain: Jonathan Smith
- Home arena: McDonough Gymnasium

1974–75 NCAA Division I men's basketball independents standings
	Conf.				Overall
Team	W		L	PCT	W		L	PCT
Texas–Pan American		–		–	22	–	2	.917
UNC Charlotte		–		–	23	–	3	.885
Centenary (LA)		–		–	25	–	4	.862
No. 11 Marquette		–		–	23	–	4	.852
Stetson		–		–	22	–	4	.846
No. 13 Cincinnati		–		–	23	–	6	.793
Utah State		–		–	21	–	6	.778
Rutgers		–		–	22	–	7	.759
Creighton		–		–	20	–	7	.741
Memphis State		–		–	20	–	7	.741
South Alabama		–		–	19	–	7	.731
No. 6 Syracuse		–		–	23	–	9	.719
Holy Cross		–		–	20	–	8	.714
Oral Roberts		–		–	20	–	8	.714
Boston College		–		–	21	–	9	.700
Florida State		–		–	18	–	8	.692
Portland State		–		–	18	–	8	.692
UC Santa Barbara		–		–	18	–	8	.692
VCU		–		–	17	–	8	.680
South Carolina		–		–	19	–	9	.679
St. John's		–		–	21	–	10	.677
Southern Illinois		–		–	18	–	9	.667
No. 14 Notre Dame		–		–	19	–	10	.655
Detroit		–		–	17	–	9	.654
No. 20 Providence		–		–	20	–	11	.645
Georgetown		–		–	18	–	10	.643
George Washington		–		–	17	–	10	.630
Pittsburgh		–		–	18	–	11	.621
Houston		–		–	16	–	10	.615
Illinois State		–		–	16	–	10	.615
Tulane		–		–	16	–	10	.615
Virginia Tech		–		–	16	–	10	.615
Canisius		–		–	15	–	10	.600
DePaul		–		–	15	–	10	.600
Northeast Louisiana		–		–	15	–	10	.600
South Florida		–		–	15	–	10	.600
Seton Hall		–		–	16	–	11	.593
Jacksonville		–		–	15	–	11	.577
Duquesne		–		–	14	–	11	.560
Hawaii		–		–	14	–	11	.560
Saint Peter's		–		–	15	–	12	.556
Cleveland State		–		–	13	–	11	.542
Manhattan		–		–	14	–	12	.538
Air Force		–		–	13	–	12	.520
LIU		–		–	13	–	12	.520
St. Bonaventure		–		–	14	–	13	.519
West Virginia		–		–	14	–	13	.519
Cal State Los Angeles		–		–	13	–	13	.500
Marshall		–		–	13	–	13	.500
Navy		–		–	12	–	12	.500
Northeastern		–		–	12	–	12	.500
Fairfield		–		–	13	–	14	.481
Niagara		–		–	13	–	14	.481
Fordham		–		–	12	–	13	.480
Penn State		–		–	11	–	12	.478
Indiana State		–		–	12	–	14	.462
Oklahoma City		–		–	12	–	14	.462
Saint Louis		–		–	12	–	14	.462
Fairleigh Dickinson		–		–	11	–	13	.458
Portland		–		–	13	–	16	.448
Saint Francis (PA)		–		–	11	–	14	.440
Georgia Tech		–		–	11	–	15	.423
Southern Miss		–		–	11	–	15	.423
Xavier		–		–	11	–	15	.423
Ball State		–		–	10	–	15	.400
Loyola-Chicago		–		–	10	–	15	.400
Butler		–		–	10	–	16	.385
Dayton		–		–	10	–	16	.385
Denver		–		–	9	–	16	.360
Northern Illinois		–		–	8	–	15	.348
Houston Baptist		–		–	9	–	17	.346
Mercer		–		–	9	–	17	.346
Samford		–		–	9	–	17	.346
Colgate		–		–	8	–	16	.333
Villanova		–		–	9	–	18	.333
Buffalo		–		–	8	–	17	.320
Georgia Southern		–		–	8	–	18	.308
Georgia State		–		–	8	–	18	.308
Wisconsin-Milwaukee		–		–	8	–	18	.308
St. Francis (NY)		–		–	7	–	19	.269
Baptist		–		–	4	–	16	.200
Hardin-Simmons		–		–	5	–	20	.200
Iona		–		–	4	–	19	.174
Army		–		–	3	–	22	.120
Rankings from AP Poll

The 1974–75 Georgetown Hoyas men's basketball team represented Georgetown University during the 1974–75 NCAA Division I college basketball season. John Thompson, coached them in his third season as head coach. Georgetown was an independent that played its home games at McDonough Gymnasium on the Georgetown campus in Washington, D.C., and finished the season with a record of 18–10. The team won the 1975 ECAC South Region tournament and appeared in the 1975 NCAA tournament – the Hoyas's first appearance in that tournament since 1943 – and lost to Central Michigan in the first round.

== Season recap ==
The team struggled during the first half of the season, and a six-game losing streak caused its record to fall to 7–8 by the end of January 1975. Some people called for Thompson to be fired. A contributing factor in the Hoyas' woes was the performance of junior center Merlin Wilson, who also received criticism; in contrast to his first two years with the team, he seemed sluggish when running, did not pull down as many rebounds as he once had, and suffered a scoring slump. He turned out to have a painful, undiagnosed back problem. His play remained uneven all season but improved in later games, including 17 points and 13 rebounds against St. Joseph's and 23 rebounds against Saint Francis, and he finished the year as Georgetown's top rebounder. Sophomore forward Larry Long, meanwhile, averaged 9.4 points and 6.2 rebounds per game despite suffering ankle, thigh, and knee injuries. Freshman power forward Ed Hopkins started every game, averaged 9.8 points and 8.1 rebounds per game, and shot 49% from the field.

Freshmen Derrick Jackson and Mike Riley alternated at guard, and Jackson showed signs of the scoring threat that he would become, averaging 10.6 points per game and scoring a season-high 19 against St. John's on January 4, 1975, in Georgetown's first road victory over the Redmen since December 1947. Junior guard Jonathan Smith, meanwhile, scored 20 or more points in four of the first eight games of the season; although he suffered a broken finger in a December 1974 game, he nonetheless was Georgetown's top scorer for a second season.

Although retaining its status as an independent, Georgetown enhanced its chances for a berth in the NCAA tournament this season by joining the Eastern College Athletic Conference (ECAC), a loosely organized sports federation that in 1975 for the first time held regional post-season Division I basketball tournaments – four in all – for independent Eastern colleges and universities similar to the end-of-season conference tournaments held by conventional college basketball conferences, with each tournament winner receiving an at-large bid to the 1975 NCAA Division I men's basketball tournament. Georgetown participated in the ECAC South Region tournament. The first game was a semifinal match-up against George Washington, a team which had defeated Georgetown during the regular season and in seven of the last nine meetings between the schools. Derrick Jackson scored 18 points as the Hoyas prevailed this time, defeating the Colonials 66–59 to advance to the final.

In the ECAC South final, Georgetown faced West Virginia on the Mountaineers' home court at the WVU Coliseum before a crowd of some 14,000 West Virginia fans and a few hundred Hoya supporters. Jonathan Smith scored 10 points in the game and West Virginia guard Bob Huggins scored 14. The Mountaineers led 32-31 at halftime and appeared to have an advantage when Merlin Wilson and Larry Long both fouled out in the second half. With 54 seconds left in the game and West Virginia leading 61-58, Derrick Jackson scored to close to 61–60. The Mountaineers tried to preserve the win by running out the clock, but Georgetown's Mike Riley fouled West Virginia's Ernie Hall with 10 seconds left to stop the clock. Hall came to the free-throw line to shoot a one-anad-one, and missed his first shot. Ed Hopkins – who shot a career-low 25% (4-for-16) but pulled down 12 rebounds – grabbed the rebound and passed it to junior guard Bill Thomas, who threw a long, cross court pass to Jackson with five seconds left. Jackson promptly scored on an 18-foot (5.5-meter) shot with two seconds left, silencing the crowd – except for the handful of Georgetown fans celebrating in the stands – and giving Georgetown a 62–61 victory. Jackson's shot became known in Georgetown men's basketball history as the "Shot Heard 'Round the World," because the unlikely victory secured the Hoyas' first NCAA tournament berth since the 1942–43 season and began the school's pattern of regular appearances in the tournament in the years to come.

The 1974–75 squad was only the second team in Georgetown men's basketball history to play in the NCAA Tournament, and it was the first Georgetown men's basketball team to be invited to either the NCAA Tournament or the National Invitation Tournament (NIT) since the 1969-70 team's appearance in the 1970 NIT. Playing in the tournament's Mideast Region, the Hoyas met Central Michigan in the first round. Junior Hoya forward Bill Lynn scored 14 points and had 11 rebounds in the game. With six seconds left to play, the score was tied 75–75 when a held ball forced a jump ball. Georgetown's Ed Hopkins grabbed the tip and passed it to Derrick Jackson, who threw it to Jonathan Smith. Smith dribbled toward the basket and put up a long shot as time expired that missed. Central Michigan guard Leonard Drake undercut Smith as he shot, but an official off the ball called an offensive foul on Smith. Drake made both of his resulting free throws with no time remaining to give the Chippewas a 77–75 win and knock Georgetown out of the tournament. John Thompson objected strenuously, and game films later supported the view that it was Drake who had fouled Smith in the act of shooting.

On November 30, 1974, Rich Chvotkin debuted as the radio voice of the Hoyas with a broadcast on WOOK-AM of the season opener against Upsala at McDonough Gymnasium, giving Georgetown its first regular radio coverage. Chvotkin would go on to broadcast every Georgetown men's basketball game since except for most of those of the 1990-1991 season, when he was mobilized for six months of United States Army Reserve service during the Gulf War after calling only the first four games of that season.

The team was not ranked in the Top 20 in the Associated Press Poll or Coaches' Poll at any time.

== Roster ==
Freshman guard Craig Esherick would later serve as an assistant coach for the Hoyas from 1982 to 1999 and as head coach from 1999 to 2004. Freshman guard Mike Riley would later serve as a Hoya assistant coach from 1982 to 2004.

#	Name	Height	Weight (lbs.)	Position	Class	Hometown	Previous team(s)
10	Craig Esherick	6'3"	N/A	G	Fr.	Silver Spring, MD, U.S.	Springbrook HS
12	Mike Riley	5'8"	N/A	G	Fr.	Washington, DC, U.S.	United States Navy
14	Bill Lynn	6'9"	185	F	Jr.	Washington, DC, U.S.	Spingarn HS
20	Emmet Fitzgerald	5'9"	N/A	G	So.	Philadelphia, PA, U.S.	Malvern Preparatory School
22	Derrick Jackson	6'0"	180	G	Fr.	Wheaton, IL, U.S.	Wheaton Central HS
24	Bill Thomas	6'4"	N/A	F	Jr.	Dallas, TX, U.S.	Lake Highlands HS; Northampton Community College (Pa.)
30	Jonathan Smith	6'1"	185	G	Jr.	Washington, DC, U.S.	St. Anthony's HS
32	Larry Long	6'7"	200	F	So.	Washington, DC, U.S.	Mackin HS
34	Mike MacDermott	6'4"	N/A	G	So.	Saratoga Springs, NY, U.S.	St. Peter HS
40	Greg Brooks	6'6"	N/A	G	Jr.	Washington, DC, U.S.	St. Anthony's HS
42	Felix Yeoman	6'7"	N/A	F/C	Fr.	Washington, DC, U.S.	St. Anthony's HS
44	Merlin Wilson	6'9"	215	C	Jr.	Washington, DC, U.S.	St. Anthony's HS
52	Ed Hopkins	6'9"	225	C	Fr.	Baltimore, MD, U.S.	Edmondson-Westside HS

== 1974–75 schedule and results ==
Sources

- All times are Eastern

Date time, TV	Rank^{#}	Opponent^{#}	Result	Record	Site city, state
Regular season
Sat., Nov. 30, 1974 no, no		Upsala	W 80–58	1-0	McDonough Gymnasium; Washington, DC
Tue., Dec. 3, 1974 no, no		Loyola Maryland	W 80–58	2-0	McDonough Gymnasium; Washington, DC
Sat., Dec. 7, 1974 no, no		St. Bonaventure	W 77–57	3-0	McDonough Gymnasium; Washington, DC
Tue., Dec. 10, 1974 no, no		vs. No. 4 Maryland	L 71–104	3-1	Capital Centre; Landover, MD
Mon., Dec. 23, 1974 no, no		Eastern Kentucky	W 79–69	4-1	McDonough Gymnasium; Washington, DC
Fri., Dec. 27, 1974 no, no		vs. Syracuse; Kodak Classic Semifinal/Rivalry	W 71–70	5-1	Rochester Community War Memorial; Rochester, NY
Sat., Dec. 28, 1974 no, no		vs. Dartmouth; Kodak Classic Final	L 56–57	5-2	Rochester Community War Memorial; Rochester, NY
Sat., Jan. 4, 1975 no, no		at St. John's	W 67–63	6-2	Alumni Hall; Queens, NY
Tue., Jan. 7, 1975 no, no		at Boston University	W 90–75	7-2	Case Gymnasium; Boston, MA
Sat., Jan. 11, 1975 no, no		at Randolph–Macon	L 64–74	7-3	Crenshaw Gymnasium; Ashland, VA
Wed., Jan. 15, 1975 no, no		at Fairfield	L 65–76	7-4	University Gymnasium; Fairfield, CT
Sat., Jan. 18, 1975 no, no		Seton Hall	L 67–84	7-5	McDonough Gymnasium; Washington, DC
Wed., Jan. 22, 1975 no, no		at American	L 80–81 ^{OT}	7-6	Fort Myer Gymnasium; Fort Myer, VA
Sat., Jan. 25, 1975 no, no		at Holy Cross	L 86–108	7-7	Worcester Memorial Auditorium; Worcester, MA
Wed., Jan. 29, 1975 no, no		St. Peter's	L 68–70	7-8	McDonough Gymnasium; Washington, DC
Sat., Feb. 1, 1975 no, no		at Penn State	W 77–66	8-8	Recreation Hall; State College, PA
Wed., Feb. 5, 1975 no, no		Dickinson	W 102–60	9-8	McDonough Gymnasium; Washington, DC
Sat., Feb. 8, 1975 no, no		Fairleigh Dickinson	W 89–54	10-8	McDonough Gymnasium; Washington, DC
Wed., Feb. 12, 1975 no, no		St. Joseph's	W 89–70	11-8	McDonough Gymnasium; Washington, DC
Sat., Feb. 15, 1975 no, no		Boston College	W 90–82 ^{2OT}	12-8	McDonough Gymnasium; Washington, DC
Wed., Feb. 19, 1975 no, no		Saint Francis	W 90–71	13-8	McDonough Gymnasium; Washington, DC
Sat., Feb. 22, 1975 no, no		Manhattan	W 101–73	14-8	McDonough Gymnasium; Washington, DC
Wed., Feb. 26, 1975 no, no		at George Washington	L 78–82	14-9	Fort Myer Gymnasium; Fort Myer, VA
Sat., Mar. 1, 1975 no, no		Fordham	W 66–60	15-9	McDonough Gymnasium; Washington, DC
Tue., Mar. 4, 1975 no, no		Wheeling Jesuit	W 105–69	16-9	McDonough Gymnasium; Washington, DC
ECAC South Region tournament
Fri., Mar. 7, 1975 no, no		vs. George Washington; Semifinal	W 66–59	17-9	WVU Coliseum; Morgantown, WV
Sat., Mar. 8, 1975 no, no		at West Virginia; Final	W 62–61	18-9	WVU Coliseum; Morgantown, WV
NCAA tournament
Sat., Mar. 15, 1975 no, no		vs. Central Michigan; Mideast Region First Round	L 75–77	18-10	Memorial Coliseum; Tuscaloosa, AL
*Non-conference game. ^{#}Rankings from AP Poll. (#) Tournament seedings in parentheses.
