= 1974–75 Louisville Cardinals men's basketball team =

American college basketball season

1974–75 Louisville Cardinals men's basketball

Missouri Valley Conference champions

NCAA Men's Division I Tournament, Final Four
- Conference: Missouri Valley Conference

Ranking
- Coaches: No. 3
- AP: No. 4
- Record: 28–3 (12–2 MVC)
- Head coach: Denny Crum (4th season)
- Home arena: Freedom Hall

1974–75 Missouri Valley Conference men's basketball standings
	Conf.				Overall
Team	W		L	PCT	W		L	PCT
No. 4 Louisville	12	–	2	.857	28	–	3	.903
New Mexico State	11	–	3	.786	20	–	7	.741
No. 16 Drake	9	–	5	.643	19	–	10	.655
Bradley	7	–	7	.500	15	–	11	.577
Wichita State	6	–	8	.429	11	–	15	.423
Tulsa	5	–	9	.357	15	–	14	.517
West Texas State	3	–	11	.214	9	–	17	.346
North Texas State	3	–	11	.214	6	–	20	.231
Rankings from AP Poll

The 1974–75 Louisville Cardinals men's basketball team represented the University of Louisville in NCAA Division I men's competition in the 1974–75 season. Coached by Denny Crum, the Cardinals won the Missouri Valley Conference title in their last season as a member (they would become a founding member of the Metro Conference the following year), and advanced to the Final Four of that season's NCAA tournament, losing in the semifinals to a UCLA team coached by Crum's retiring mentor, John Wooden.

The Cardinals played their home games at Freedom Hall, their home from the 1956–57 season until their move to the new KFC Yum! Center for the 2010–11 season.

== NCAA basketball tournament ==
- Midwest
  - Louisville 91, Rutgers 78
  - Louisville 78, Cincinnati 63
  - Louisville 96, Maryland 82
- Final Four
  - UCLA 75, Louisville 74
  - Louisville 96, Syracuse 88 OT (3rd Place)

== Team players drafted into the NBA ==
Round	Pick	Player	NBA club
1	8	Junior Bridgeman	Los Angeles Lakers

== See also ==
- Louisville Cardinals men's basketball
- 1975 NCAA Division I men's basketball tournament
