= 1974–75 Kentucky Wildcats men's basketball team =

1974–75 season of University of Kentucky men's basketball team

1974–75 Kentucky Wildcats men's basketball

NCAA Tournament, runner-up SEC champions

National Championship Game, L 85-92 vs. UCLA
- Conference: Southeast Conference

Ranking
- Coaches: No. 4
- AP: No. 2
- Record: 26–5 (15–3 SEC)
- Head coach: Joe B. Hall (3rd season)
- Assistant coaches: Dick Parsons; Ray Edelman; Leonard Hamilton
- Home arena: Memorial Coliseum

The 1974–75 Kentucky Wildcats men's basketball team represented the University of Kentucky and was the 1975 NCAA runner-up. The head coach was Joe B. Hall. The team was a member of the Southeast Conference and played their home games at Memorial Coliseum.

== NCAA tournament ==
Following the contentious regular season game, Indiana and Kentucky met in the 1975 NCAA Mideast Regional Final in Dayton, Ohio. Coming into that game, the Hoosiers were on a 34-game winning streak, and the number one ranked team in America. Kentucky was ranked number five. However, Indiana had lost star player Scott May to a broken arm in the regular season finale against Purdue. May scored 25 points in the regular season IU-UK meeting, but he managed only 2 points in seven minutes in the Tournament game, which he played with a cast on his left arm that limited him to 7 minutes. IU surged to an early seven-point lead before UK rallied to tie it at 44 by halftime. Despite Indiana's Kent Benson scoring 33 points (on 13-of-18 shooting) and grabbing 23 rebounds, Kentucky would win by just two points, 92–90. The game made USA Today's list of the greatest NCAA tournament games of all time.

- East
  - Kentucky 76, Marquette 54
  - Kentucky 90, Central Michigan 73
  - Kentucky 92, Indiana 90
- Final Four
  - Kentucky 95, Syracuse 79
  - UCLA 92, Kentucky 85

== Team players drafted into the NBA ==
Round	Pick	Player	NBA club
1	18	Kevin Grevey	Washington Bullets
2	36	Jimmy Dan Conner	Phoenix Suns
3	49	Bob Guyette	Kansas City Kings
7	113	Mike Flynn	Philadelphia 76ers
