= Dick Parfitt =

American basketball coach (1931–2021)

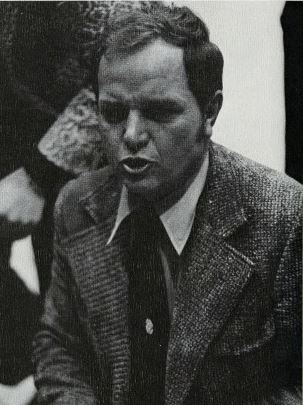
- Parfitt during the 1973–74 season

Biographical details
- Born: May 13, 1931; Gratiot County, Michigan, U.S.
- Died: September 6, 2021 (aged 90); Mount Pleasant, Michigan, U.S.

Playing career
- 1950–1953: Central Michigan

Coaching career (HC unless noted)
- 1962–1971: Central Michigan (assistant)
- 1971–1985: Central Michigan

Head coaching record
- Overall: 192–179

Accomplishments and honors

Championships
- 2 MAC regular season (1975, 1977)

Awards
- MAC Coach of the Year (1975)

Richard Allen Parfitt (May 13, 1931 – September 6, 2021) was an American college basketball coach. He was head coach for Central Michigan University (CMU) from 1971 to 1985, during which time he led their move from the National Association of Intercollegiate Athletics (NAIA) to NCAA Division I.

Parfitt was born in Gratiot County, Michigan and attended Central Michigan College, where he played basketball and baseball for the Chippewas. Following his graduation in 1953, he became a teacher and high school basketball coach in Laingsburg, Michigan, starting a prep coaching career that would last until 1962 when he returned to his alma mater as an assistant basketball and baseball coach. In 1971 he was named head coach upon the resignation of Ted Kjolhede. Parfitt served as Central Michigan's head coach as the program transitioned from the NAIA to NCAA Division I status, joining the Mid-American Conference (MAC) in the 1972–73 season. Parfitt quickly built a successful program, winning conference titles and earning the school's first two NCAA tournament appearances in 1975 and 1977. In all, Parfitt served 14 seasons as the Chippewas' head coach, compiling a career record of 192–179.

Parfitt died on September 6, 2021, at age 90.

== See also ==
- Coaching record @ sports-reference.com
