= 1974–75 NCAA Division I men's basketball season =

Men's collegiate basketball season

- Preseason AP No. 1: NC State Wolfpack
- NCAA Tournament: 1975
- Tournament dates: March 15 – 31, 1975
- National Championship: San Diego Sports Arena; San Diego, California
- NCAA Champions: UCLA Bruins
- Helms National Champions: UCLA Bruins
- Other champions: Princeton Tigers (NIT)
- Player of the Year (Naismith, Wooden): David Thompson, NC State Wolfpack
- Player of the Year (Helms): David Thompson, NC State Wolfpack

The 1974–75 NCAA Division I men's basketball season began in November 1974, progressed through the regular season and conference tournaments, and concluded with the 1975 NCAA Men's Division I Basketball Tournament Championship Game on March 31, 1975, at the San Diego Sports Arena in San Diego, California. The UCLA Bruins won their tenth NCAA national championship with a 92–85 victory over the Kentucky Wildcats.

== Season headlines ==
- The NCAA Division I men's basketball tournament expanded from 25 to 32 teams.
- For the first time, teams other than the conference champion could be chosen at large from the same conference for the NCAA tournament. No more than two teams from any one conference could be chosen for the tournament until 1980, but the NCAA's decision to allow even as many as two teams per conference into the annual tournament threatened to greatly reduce or even eliminate the access of Division I independents — most of which were located in the Northeastern United States — to the tournament. This resulted in a steady decline in the number of independents in ensuing seasons as former independents formed conferences to ensure their access to an automatic tournament bid each year.
- In a 1975 Cleveland Plain Dealer article, sportswriter Ed Chay used the term "final four" to refer to the semifinals of the NCAA tournament, giving rise to a myth that this was the first such use of the term. In fact, the term "final four" already was in use in the 1960s.
- In the Pacific 8 Conference, UCLA won its ninth of what would ultimately be 13 consecutive conference titles.
- The National Commissioners Invitational Tournament (NCIT), a new postseason tournament created by the NCAA in 1974 as the Collegiate Commissioners Association Tournament to compete with the National Invitation Tournament, was played for the second and final time in 1975.

== Season outlook ==
=== Pre-season polls ===
The top 20 from the AP Poll during the pre-season.

'Associated Press'
Ranking	Team
1	NC State
2	UCLA
3	Indiana
4	Maryland
5	Marqette
6	Kansas
7	South Carolina
8	Louisville
9	Alabama
10	USC
11	North Carolina
12	Notre Dame
13	Purdue
14	Providence
15	Memphis State
16	Kentucky
17	Michigan
18	Minnesota
19	Arizona
20	Penn

UPI Coaches
Ranking	Team
1	NC State
2	UCLA
3	Indiana
4	Louisville
5	North Carolina
6	USC
7	Marquette
8	Alabama
9	Kansas
10	Maryland
11	Notre Dame
12	South Carolina
13	Penn
14	Arizona State
15	Arizona
16 (tie)	Oregon State
16 (tie)	Purdue
18	Memphis State
19 (tie)	Michigan
19 (tie)	Oregon

== Conference membership changes ==
School	Former conference	New conference
American Eagles	Middle Atlantic Conference	East Coast Conference
Baptist Buccaneers	non-Division I	Division I independent
Bucknell Bison	Middle Atlantic Conference	East Coast Conference
Cal State Fullerton Titans	Non-Division I	Pacific Coast Athletic Association
Cal State Los Angeles Golden Eagles	Pacific Coast Athletic Association	Division I independent
Delaware Fightin' Blue Hens	Middle Atlantic Conference	East Coast Conference
Drexel Dragons	Middle Atlantic Conference	East Coast Conference
Eastern Michigan Eagles	Division I independent	Mid-American Conference
Gettysburg Bullets	Middle Atlantic Conference	Non-Division I
Hofstra Pride	Middle Atlantic Conference	East Coast Conference
La Salle Explorers	Middle Atlantic Conference	East Coast Conference
Lafayette Leopards	Middle Atlantic Conference	East Coast Conference
Lehigh Engineers	Middle Atlantic Conference	East Coast Conference
Rider Broncs	Middle Atlantic Conference	East Coast Conference
St. Joseph's Hawks	Middle Atlantic Conference	East Coast Conference
Saint Louis Billikens	Missouri Valley Conference	Division I independent
Temple Owls	Middle Atlantic Conference	East Coast Conference
UC Santa Barbara Gauchos	Pacific Coast Athletic Association	Division I independent
West Chester Golden Rams	Middle Atlantic Conference	East Coast Conference

== Regular season ==
=== Conferences ===
==== Conference winners and tournaments ====
Conference	Regular season winner	Conference player of the year	Conference tournament	Tournament venue (City)	Tournament winner
Atlantic Coast Conference	Maryland	David Thompson, NC State	1975 ACC men's basketball tournament	Greensboro Coliseum (Greensboro, North Carolina)	North Carolina
Big Eight Conference	Kansas	Alvan Adams, Oklahoma	No Tournament		
Big Sky Conference	Montana	None selected	No Tournament		
Big Ten Conference	Indiana	None Selected	No Tournament		
East Coast Conference	American & La Salle (East); Lafayette (West)	Wilbur Thomas, American (East) & Henry Horne, Lafayette (West)	1975 East Coast Conference men's basketball tournament	Kirby Sports Center (Easton, Pennsylvania)	La Salle
Eastern College Athletic; Conference (ECAC)	Division I ECAC members played as independents during the regular season (see note)		1975 ECAC Metro Region tournament	Madison Square Garden (New York, New York)	Rutgers
Eastern College Athletic; Conference (ECAC)	Division I ECAC members played as independents during the regular season (see note)		1975 ECAC New England Region tournament	Springfield Civic Center (Springfield, Massachusetts)	Boston College
Eastern College Athletic; Conference (ECAC)	Division I ECAC members played as independents during the regular season (see note)		1975 ECAC Southern Region tournament	WVU Coliseum (Morgantown, West Virginia)	Georgetown
Eastern College Athletic; Conference (ECAC)	Division I ECAC members played as independents during the regular season (see note)		1975 ECAC Upstate Region tournament	Buffalo Memorial Auditorium (Buffalo, New York)	Syracuse
Ivy League	Penn	Ron Haigler, Penn	No Tournament		
Mid-American Conference	Central Michigan	Dan Roundfield, Central Michigan	No Tournament		
Missouri Valley Conference	Louisville	Junior Bridgeman, Louisville	No Tournament		
Ohio Valley Conference	Middle Tennessee	George Sorrell, Middle Tennessee	1975 Ohio Valley Conference men's basketball tournament	Murphy Center (Murfreesboro, Tennessee) (Semifinals and Finals)	Middle Tennessee
Pacific-8 Conference	UCLA	None Selected	No Tournament		
Pacific Coast Athletic Association	Long Beach State	Bob Gross, Long Beach State	No Tournament		
Southeastern Conference	Alabama & Kentucky	Kevin Grevey, Kentucky, & Bernard King, Tennessee	No Tournament		
Southern Conference	Furman	Clyde Mayes, Furman	1975 Southern Conference men's basketball tournament	Greenville Memorial Auditorium (Greenville, South Carolina) (Semifinals and Finals)	Furman
Southland Conference	McNeese State	Henry Ray, McNeese State	No Tournament		
Southwest Conference	Texas A&M	Rick Bullock, Texas Tech	No Tournament		
West Coast Athletic Conference	UNLV	Ricky Sobers, UNLV	No Tournament		
Western Athletic Conference	Arizona State	None Selected	No Tournament		
Yankee Conference	Massachusetts	None Selected	No Tournament		

NOTE: From 1975 to 1981, the Eastern College Athletic Conference (ECAC), a loosely organized sports federation of colleges and universities in the Northeastern United States, organized Division I ECAC regional tournaments for those of its members that were independents in basketball. Each 1975 tournament winner received an automatic bid to the 1975 NCAA Men's Division I Basketball Tournament in the same way that the tournament champions of conventional athletic conferences did.

==== Conference standings ====
1974–75 ACC men's basketball standings
	Conf.				Overall
Team	W		L	PCT	W		L	PCT
No. 5 Maryland	10	–	2	.833	24	–	5	.828
No. 9 North Carolina †	8	–	4	.667	23	–	8	.742
Clemson	8	–	4	.667	17	–	11	.607
No. 7 NC State	8	–	4	.667	22	–	6	.786
Virginia	4	–	8	.333	12	–	13	.480
Duke	2	–	10	.167	13	–	13	.500
Wake Forest	2	–	10	.167	13	–	13	.500
† 1975 ACC tournament winner Rankings from AP Poll

1974–75 Big Eight Conference men's basketball standings
	Conf.				Overall
Team	W		L	PCT	W		L	PCT
Kansas	11	–	3	.786	19	–	8	.704
No. 15 Kansas State	10	–	4	.714	20	–	9	.690
Missouri	9	–	5	.643	18	–	9	.667
Nebraska	7	–	7	.500	14	–	12	.538
Oklahoma	6	–	8	.429	13	–	13	.500
Oklahoma State	5	–	9	.357	10	–	16	.385
Iowa State	4	–	10	.286	10	–	16	.385
Colorado	4	–	10	.286	7	–	19	.269
Rankings from AP Poll

1974–75 Big Sky men's basketball standings
	Conf.				Overall
Team	W		L	PCT	W		L	PCT
Montana	13	–	1	.929	21	–	8	.724
Idaho State	9	–	5	.643	16	–	10	.615
Boise State	7	–	7	.500	13	–	13	.500
Gonzaga	7	–	7	.500	13	–	13	.500
Weber State	6	–	8	.429	11	–	15	.423
Montana State	5	–	9	.357	11	–	15	.423
Northern Arizona	5	–	9	.357	9	–	17	.346
Idaho	4	–	10	.286	10	–	16	.385

1974–75 Big Ten Conference men's basketball standings
	Conf.				Overall
Team	W		L	PCT	W		L	PCT
No. 3 Indiana	18	–	0	1.000	31	–	1	.969
No. 19 Michigan	12	–	6	.667	19	–	8	.704
Minnesota	11	–	7	.611	18	–	8	.692
Purdue	11	–	7	.611	17	–	11	.607
Michigan State	10	–	8	.556	17	–	9	.654
Ohio State	8	–	10	.444	14	–	14	.500
Iowa	7	–	11	.389	10	–	16	.385
Wisconsin	5	–	13	.278	8	–	18	.308
Illinois	4	–	14	.222	8	–	18	.308
Northwestern	4	–	14	.222	6	–	20	.231
Rankings from AP Poll

1974–75 ECC men's basketball standings
	Conf.				Overall
Team	W		L	PCT	W		L	PCT
East
American	5	–	1	.833	16	–	10	.615
La Salle †	5	–	1	.833	22	–	7	.759
Temple	4	–	2	.667	7	–	19	.269
Hofstra	3	–	3	.500	11	–	13	.458
Saint Joseph's	3	–	3	.500	8	–	17	.320
West Chester	1	–	5	.167	8	–	17	.320
Drexel	0	–	6	.000	12	–	11	.522
West
Lafayette	7	–	1	.875	22	–	6	.786
Rider	5	–	3	.625	16	–	11	.593
Bucknell	4	–	4	.500	14	–	12	.538
Delaware	4	–	4	.500	12	–	13	.480
Lehigh	0	–	8	.000	1	–	23	.042
† 1975 ECC tournament winner Rankings from AP Poll

1974–75 Ivy League men's basketball standings
	Conf.				Overall
Team	W		L	PCT	W		L	PCT
Pennsylvania	13	–	1	.929	23	–	5	.821
No. 12 Princeton	12	–	2	.857	22	–	8	.733
Brown	9	–	5	.643	14	–	12	.538
Harvard	9	–	5	.643	12	–	13	.480
Dartmouth	5	–	9	.357	8	–	18	.308
Cornell	4	–	10	.286	7	–	18	.280
Columbia	2	–	12	.143	4	–	22	.154
Yale	2	–	12	.143	3	–	20	.130
Rankings from AP Poll

1974–75 Mid-American Conference men's basketball standings
	Conf.				Overall
Team	W		L	PCT	W		L	PCT
Central Michigan	10	–	4	.714	22	–	6	.786
Toledo	9	–	5	.643	17	–	9	.654
Bowling Green State	9	–	5	.643	18	–	10	.643
Miami (Ohio)	8	–	5	.615	19	–	7	.731
Western Michigan	8	–	6	.571	16	–	10	.615
Eastern Michigan	4	–	9	.308	12	–	14	.462
Ohio	4	–	10	.286	12	–	14	.462
Kent State	3	–	11	.214	6	–	20	.231
Rankings from AP Poll

1974–75 Missouri Valley Conference men's basketball standings
	Conf.				Overall
Team	W		L	PCT	W		L	PCT
No. 4 Louisville	12	–	2	.857	28	–	3	.903
New Mexico State	11	–	3	.786	20	–	7	.741
No. 16 Drake	9	–	5	.643	19	–	10	.655
Bradley	7	–	7	.500	15	–	11	.577
Wichita State	6	–	8	.429	11	–	15	.423
Tulsa	5	–	9	.357	15	–	14	.517
West Texas State	3	–	11	.214	9	–	17	.346
North Texas State	3	–	11	.214	6	–	20	.231
Rankings from AP Poll

1974–75 Ohio Valley Conference men's basketball standings
	Conf.				Overall
Team	W		L	PCT	W		L	PCT
Middle Tennessee†	12	–	2	.857	23	–	5	.821
Western Kentucky	11	–	3	.786	16	–	8	.667
Austin Peay State	10	–	4	.714	17	–	10	.630
Tennessee Tech	7	–	7	.500	13	–	12	.520
Morehead State	5	–	9	.357	13	–	13	.500
East Tennessee State	5	–	9	.357	9	–	14	.391
Murray State	3	–	11	.214	10	–	15	.400
Eastern Kentucky	3	–	11	.214	7	–	18	.280
† Ohio Valley Conference tournament winner Rankings from AP Poll

1974–75 Pacific-8 Conference men's basketball standings
	Conf.				Overall
Team	W		L	PCT	W		L	PCT
No. 1 UCLA	12	–	2	.857	28	–	3	.903
No. 18 Oregon State	10	–	4	.714	19	–	12	.613
USC	8	–	6	.571	18	–	8	.692
California	7	–	7	.500	17	–	9	.654
Oregon	6	–	8	.429	21	–	9	.700
Washington	6	–	8	.429	16	–	10	.615
Stanford	6	–	8	.429	12	–	14	.462
Washington State	1	–	13	.071	10	–	16	.385
Rankings from AP Poll

1974–75 Pacific Coast Athletic Association men's basketball standings
	Conf.				Overall
Team	W		L	PCT	W		L	PCT
Long Beach State	8	–	2	.800	19	–	7	.731
San Diego State	6	–	4	.600	14	–	13	.519
Fresno State	5	–	5	.500	16	–	10	.615
San Jose State	4	–	6	.400	16	–	13	.552
Cal State Fullerton	4	–	6	.400	13	–	11	.542
Pacific	3	–	7	.300	12	–	14	.462
Rankings from AP Poll

1974–75 Southeastern Conference men's basketball standings
	Conf.				Overall
Team	W		L	PCT	W		L	PCT
No. 2 Kentucky	15	–	3	.833	26	–	5	.839
No. 10 Alabama	15	–	3	.833	22	–	5	.815
Auburn	12	–	6	.667	18	–	8	.692
Tennessee	12	–	6	.667	18	–	8	.692
Vanderbilt	10	–	8	.556	15	–	11	.577
Florida	8	–	10	.444	12	–	16	.429
LSU	6	–	12	.333	10	–	16	.385
Mississippi State	5	–	13	.278	9	–	17	.346
Ole Miss	4	–	14	.222	8	–	18	.308
Georgia	3	–	15	.167	8	–	17	.320
Rankings from AP Poll

1974–75 Southern Conference men's basketball standings
	Conf.				Overall
Team	W		L	PCT	W		L	PCT
Furman†	12	–	0	1.000	22	–	7	.759
East Carolina	11	–	3	.786	19	–	9	.679
William & Mary	6	–	5	.545	16	–	12	.571
Richmond	7	–	7	.500	10	–	16	.385
VMI	6	–	6	.500	13	–	13	.500
Davidson	4	–	6	.400	7	–	19	.269
The Citadel	2	–	11	.154	5	–	15	.250
Appalachian State	1	–	11	.083	3	–	23	.115
† Southern Conference Tournament winner Rankings from AP Poll

1974–75 Southland Conference men's basketball standings
	Conf.				Overall
Team	W		L	PCT	W		L	PCT
McNeese State	6	–	2	.750	16	–	8	.667
Louisiana Tech	5	–	3	.625	12	–	13	.480
Lamar	4	–	4	.500	7	–	16	.304
Arkansas State	3	–	5	.375	13	–	12	.520
Texas-Arlington	2	–	6	.250	6	–	20	.231
Southwestern Louisiana*	0	–	0	–	0	–	0	–
* – Served second season of NCAA two-season ban on competing. Rankings from AP Poll

1974–75 Southwest Conference men's basketball standings
	Conf.				Overall
Team	W		L	PCT	W		L	PCT
Texas A&M	12	–	2	.857	20	–	7	.741
Texas Tech	11	–	3	.786	18	–	8	.692
Arkansas	11	–	3	.786	17	–	9	.654
Texas	6	–	8	.429	10	–	15	.400
Baylor	6	–	8	.429	10	–	16	.385
TCU	4	–	10	.286	9	–	16	.360
SMU	4	–	10	.286	8	–	18	.308
Rice	2	–	12	.143	5	–	21	.192
Rankings from AP Poll

1974–75 West Coast Athletic Conference men's basketball standings
	Conf.				Overall
Team	W		L	PCT	W		L	PCT
No. 17 UNLV	13	–	1	.929	24	–	5	.828
San Francisco	9	–	5	.643	19	–	7	.731
Pepperdine	8	–	6	.571	17	–	8	.680
Loyola Marymount	7	–	7	.500	14	–	12	.538
Saint Mary's	7	–	7	.500	14	–	12	.538
Seattle	6	–	8	.429	8	–	18	.308
Santa Clara	4	–	10	.286	10	–	16	.385
Nevada	2	–	12	.143	10	–	16	.385
Rankings from AP Poll

1974–75 WAC men's basketball standings
	Conf.				Overall
Team	W		L	PCT	W		L	PCT
No. 8 Arizona State	12	–	2	.857	25	–	4	.862
UTEP	10	–	4	.714	20	–	6	.769
Arizona	9	–	5	.643	22	–	7	.759
Utah	7	–	7	.500	17	–	9	.654
Colorado State	6	–	8	.429	14	–	12	.538
BYU	5	–	9	.357	12	–	14	.462
New Mexico	4	–	10	.286	13	–	13	.500
Wyoming	3	–	11	.214	10	–	16	.385
Rankings from AP Poll

1974–75 Yankee Conference men's basketball standings
	Conf.				Overall
Team	W		L	PCT	W		L	PCT
Massachusetts	10	–	2	.833	18	–	8	.692
Connecticut	9	–	3	.750	18	–	10	.643
Vermont	8	–	4	.667	16	–	10	.615
Boston University	7	–	4	.636	12	–	13	.480
Rhode Island	3	–	7	.300	5	–	20	.200
New Hampshire	2	–	10	.167	6	–	18	.250
Maine	1	–	10	.091	11	–	14	.440

=== Division I independents ===
A total of 84 college teams played as Division I independents. Among them, Texas–Pan American (22–2) had the best winning percentage (.917) and Centenary (25–4) finished with the most wins.

1974–75 NCAA Division I men's basketball independents standings
	Conf.				Overall
Team	W		L	PCT	W		L	PCT
Texas–Pan American		–		–	22	–	2	.917
UNC Charlotte		–		–	23	–	3	.885
Centenary (LA)		–		–	25	–	4	.862
No. 11 Marquette		–		–	23	–	4	.852
Stetson		–		–	22	–	4	.846
No. 13 Cincinnati		–		–	23	–	6	.793
Utah State		–		–	21	–	6	.778
Rutgers		–		–	22	–	7	.759
Creighton		–		–	20	–	7	.741
Memphis State		–		–	20	–	7	.741
South Alabama		–		–	19	–	7	.731
No. 6 Syracuse		–		–	23	–	9	.719
Holy Cross		–		–	20	–	8	.714
Oral Roberts		–		–	20	–	8	.714
Boston College		–		–	21	–	9	.700
Florida State		–		–	18	–	8	.692
Portland State		–		–	18	–	8	.692
UC Santa Barbara		–		–	18	–	8	.692
VCU		–		–	17	–	8	.680
South Carolina		–		–	19	–	9	.679
St. John's		–		–	21	–	10	.677
Southern Illinois		–		–	18	–	9	.667
No. 14 Notre Dame		–		–	19	–	10	.655
Detroit		–		–	17	–	9	.654
No. 20 Providence		–		–	20	–	11	.645
Georgetown		–		–	18	–	10	.643
George Washington		–		–	17	–	10	.630
Pittsburgh		–		–	18	–	11	.621
Houston		–		–	16	–	10	.615
Illinois State		–		–	16	–	10	.615
Tulane		–		–	16	–	10	.615
Virginia Tech		–		–	16	–	10	.615
Canisius		–		–	15	–	10	.600
DePaul		–		–	15	–	10	.600
Northeast Louisiana		–		–	15	–	10	.600
South Florida		–		–	15	–	10	.600
Seton Hall		–		–	16	–	11	.593
Jacksonville		–		–	15	–	11	.577
Duquesne		–		–	14	–	11	.560
Hawaii		–		–	14	–	11	.560
Saint Peter's		–		–	15	–	12	.556
Cleveland State		–		–	13	–	11	.542
Manhattan		–		–	14	–	12	.538
Air Force		–		–	13	–	12	.520
LIU		–		–	13	–	12	.520
St. Bonaventure		–		–	14	–	13	.519
West Virginia		–		–	14	–	13	.519
Cal State Los Angeles		–		–	13	–	13	.500
Marshall		–		–	13	–	13	.500
Navy		–		–	12	–	12	.500
Northeastern		–		–	12	–	12	.500
Fairfield		–		–	13	–	14	.481
Niagara		–		–	13	–	14	.481
Fordham		–		–	12	–	13	.480
Penn State		–		–	11	–	12	.478
Indiana State		–		–	12	–	14	.462
Oklahoma City		–		–	12	–	14	.462
Saint Louis		–		–	12	–	14	.462
Fairleigh Dickinson		–		–	11	–	13	.458
Portland		–		–	13	–	16	.448
Saint Francis (PA)		–		–	11	–	14	.440
Georgia Tech		–		–	11	–	15	.423
Southern Miss		–		–	11	–	15	.423
Xavier		–		–	11	–	15	.423
Ball State		–		–	10	–	15	.400
Loyola-Chicago		–		–	10	–	15	.400
Butler		–		–	10	–	16	.385
Dayton		–		–	10	–	16	.385
Denver		–		–	9	–	16	.360
Northern Illinois		–		–	8	–	15	.348
Houston Baptist		–		–	9	–	17	.346
Mercer		–		–	9	–	17	.346
Samford		–		–	9	–	17	.346
Colgate		–		–	8	–	16	.333
Villanova		–		–	9	–	18	.333
Buffalo		–		–	8	–	17	.320
Georgia Southern		–		–	8	–	18	.308
Georgia State		–		–	8	–	18	.308
Wisconsin-Milwaukee		–		–	8	–	18	.308
St. Francis (NY)		–		–	7	–	19	.269
Baptist		–		–	4	–	16	.200
Hardin-Simmons		–		–	5	–	20	.200
Iona		–		–	4	–	19	.174
Army		–		–	3	–	22	.120
Rankings from AP Poll

=== Informal championships ===
Conference	Regular season winner	Most Valuable Player
Philadelphia Big 5	La Salle	Ron Haigler, Penn

La Salle finished with a 4–0 record in head-to-head competition among the Philadelphia Big 5.

== Post-season tournaments ==
=== NCAA tournament ===
==== Final Four ====
National semifinals
E	Syracuse	79
ME	Kentucky	95
MW	Louisville	74
W	UCLA	75

National finals
ME	Kentucky	85
W	UCLA	92
Third place
E	Syracuse	88
MW	Louisville	96

=== National Invitation tournament ===
==== Semifinals & finals ====
Semifinals
Providence	85
St. John's	72
Oregon	79
Princeton	58

Finals
Providence	69
Princeton	80
Third place
St. John's	76
Oregon	80

=== National Commissioners Invitational Tournament ===
The Collegiate Commissioners Association Tournament debuted the previous season as a new postseason tournament created by the NCAA to compete with the NIT. Renamed the National Commissioners Invitational Tournament, it was played for the second and last time in 1975.

==== Semifinals & final ====
Semifinals
Drake	78
Bowling Green State	65
Arizona	102
Purdue	96

Final
Drake	83
Arizona	76

== Awards ==
=== Consensus All-American teams ===
Consensus First Team
Player	Position	Class	Team
Adrian Dantley	F	Sophomore	Notre Dame
John Lucas	G	Junior	Maryland
Scott May	F	Junior	Indiana
Dave Meyers	F	Senior	UCLA
David Thompson	G/F	Senior	North Carolina State

Consensus Second Team
Player	Position	Class	Team
Luther Burden	G	Junior	Utah
Leon Douglas	F/C	Junior	Alabama
Kevin Grevey	G	Senior	Kentucky
Ron Lee	G	Junior	Oregon
Gus Williams	G	Senior	Southern California

=== Major player of the year awards ===
- Naismith Award: David Thompson, NC State
- Helms Player of the Year: David Thompson, NC State
- Associated Press Player of the Year: David Thompson, NC State
- UPI Player of the Year: David Thompson, NC State
- NABC Player of the Year: David Thompson, NC State
- Oscar Robertson Trophy (USBWA): David Thompson, NC State
- Adolph Rupp Trophy: David Thompson, NC State
- Sporting News Player of the Year: David Thompson, NC State

=== Major coach of the year awards ===
- Associated Press Coach of the Year: Bob Knight, Indiana
- Henry Iba Award (USBWA): Bob Knight, Indiana
- NABC Coach of the Year: Bob Knight, Indiana
- UPI Coach of the Year: Bob Knight, Indiana
- Sporting News Coach of the Year: Bob Knight, Indiana

=== Other major awards ===
- Frances Pomeroy Naismith Award (Best player under 6'0): Monte Towe, NC State
- Robert V. Geasey Trophy (Top player in Philadelphia Big 5): Ron Haigler, Penn
- NIT/Haggerty Award (Top player in New York City metro area): Phil Sellers, Rutgers

== Coaching changes ==
A number of teams changed coaches during the season and after it ended.

Team	Former Coach	Interim Coach	New Coach	Reason
Appalachian State	Press Maravich		Bobby Cremins	
Army	Dan Dougherty		Mike Krzyzewski	
Baptist	Billy Henry		Danny Monk	
Bucknell	Jim Valvano		Charlie Woollum	
BYU	Glenn Potter		Frank Arnold	
Clemson	Tates Locke		Bill Foster	
Dartmouth	Marcus Jackson		Gary Walters	
Hardin–Simmons	Russell Berry		Preston Vice	
Illinois	Gene Bartow		Lou Henson	Bartow left for UCLA and was replaced by New Mexico State coach Lou Henson.
Illinois State	Will Robinson		Gene Smithson	
Iona	Gene Roberti		Jim Valvano	Roberti stayed an continued to coach Iona's baseball team.
Indiana State	Gordon C. Stauffer		Bob King	
Jacksonville	Bob Gottlieb		Don Beasley	Gottlieb left to coach Milwaukee.
Lehigh	Tom Pugliese		Brian Hill	
Loyola–Chicago	George Ireland		Jerry Lyne	
Milwaukee	Bill Klucas		Bob Gottlieb	
Minnesota	Bill Musselman		Jim Dutcher	
New Mexico State	Lou Henson		Ken Hayes	Henson left to coach Illinois.
North Texas State	Gene Robbins		Bill Blakesley	
Oklahoma	Joe Ramsey		Dave Bliss	
Pittsburgh	Charles Ridl		Tim Grgurich	
Samford	Ron Harris		Fred Crowell	
SMU	Bob Prewitt		Sonny Allen	
South Alabama	Jimmy Taylor		Cliff Ellis	
South Florida	Bill Gibson		Chip Connor	
St. Francis (NY)	John M. Prenderville		Lucio Rossini	
Stanford	Howie Dallmar		Dick DiBiaso	
Tulsa	Ken Hayes		Jim King	Hayes left to coach New Mexico State.
UCLA	John Wooden		Gene Bartow	Wooden announced his retirement during the 1975 Final Four, where he won his record tenth NCAA title. He was replaced by Illinois head coach Bartow.
UNC Charlotte	Bill Foster		Less Rose	Foster left to coach Clemson.
Yale	Joseph Vancisin		Ray Carazo	
