= Phil Ford (basketball) =

Basketball player (born 1956)

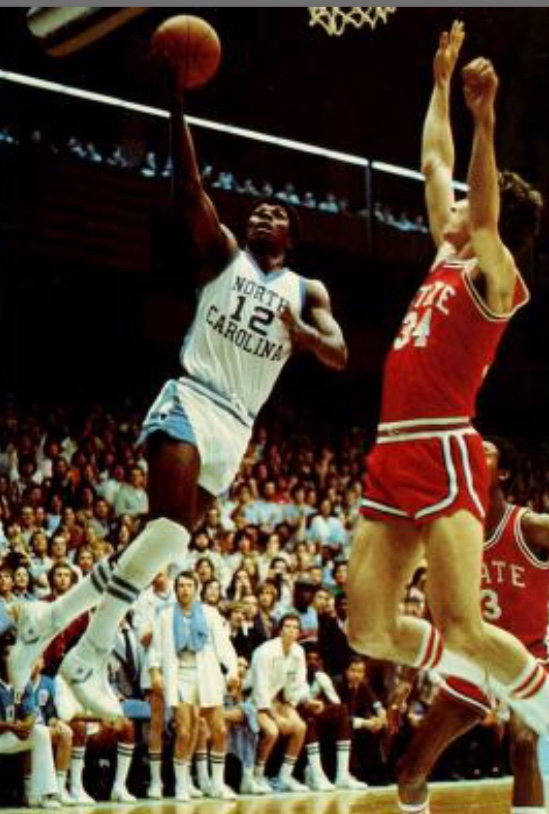
- Ford at UNC in 1977

Personal information
- Born: February 9, 1956 (age 70) Rocky Mount, North Carolina, U.S.
- Listed height: 6 ft 2 in (1.88 m)
- Listed weight: 175 lb (79 kg)

Career information
- High school: Rocky Mount (Rocky Mount, North Carolina)
- College: North Carolina (1974–1978)
- NBA draft: 1978: 1st round, 2nd overall pick
- Drafted by: Kansas City Kings
- Playing career: 1978–1985
- Position: Point guard
- Number: 1, 12
- Coaching career: 1988–2011

Career history

Playing
- 1978–1982: Kansas City Kings
- 1982: New Jersey Nets
- 1982–1983: Milwaukee Bucks
- 1983–1985: Houston Rockets

Coaching
- 1988–2000: North Carolina (assistant)
- 2004–2005: Detroit Pistons (assistant)
- 2005–2007: New York Knicks (assistant)
- 2007–2011: Charlotte Bobcats (assistant)

Career highlights
- All-NBA Second Team (1979); NBA Rookie of the Year (1979); NBA All-Rookie First Team (1979); John R. Wooden Award (1978); USBWA Player of the Year (1978); NABC Player of the Year (1978); Sporting News Player of the Year (1978); 2× Consensus first-team All-American (1977, 1978); Consensus second-team All-American (1976); 2× ACC Athlete of the Year (1977, 1978); ACC Player of the Year (1978); 3x First-team All-ACC (1976–1978); ACC tournament MVP (1975); No. 12 retired by the North Carolina Tar Heels; First-team Parade All-American (1974)

Career NBA statistics
- Points: 5,594 (11.6 ppg)
- Rebounds: 854 (1.8 rpg)
- Assists: 3,083 (6.4 apg)
- Stats at NBA.com
- Stats at Basketball Reference
- Collegiate Basketball Hall of Fame
Medals
Men's basketball
Representing the United States
Olympic Games
Gold medal – first place	1976 Montreal	Team competition

Phil Jackson Ford Jr. (born February 9, 1956) is an American former professional basketball player in the National Basketball Association (NBA). He graduated from Rocky Mount Senior High School in 1974, and had an All-American college career with the North Carolina Tar Heels.

== College career ==
Ford was the first freshman under head basketball coach Dean Smith to start in his first collegiate basketball game. During the season, he averaged 16.4 points and 5.2 assists per game – both of which were UNC freshman records that would stand for more than 20 years. Ford led UNC to a second-place finish in the Atlantic Coast Conference regular season standings, and then to a championship win over NC State in the 1975 ACC tournament. This win broke N.C. State's two-year winning streak as ACC champions. Ford averaged 26 points in the tournament and was named tournament MVP – the first freshman in ACC history to achieve that honor.

In his sophomore season, Ford averaged 18.6 points and 7.0 assists per game. His assists average established a UNC single-season record until Ed Cota averaged 7.4 assists during the 1997–98 season. Ford led UNC to a first-place finish during the ACC regular season and was a first team All-ACC selection, an honor he would also receive in his junior and senior seasons. He also was a consensus second team All-American.

In his junior season, Ford averaged 18.7 points and 6.6 assists per game while once again leading the Tar Heels to a first-place ACC regular season finish. In the 1977 ACC tournament, Ford scored 26 points in the championship game against the Virginia to propel UNC to another conference title. In the 1977 NCAA Division I basketball tournament, Ford helped advance the Tar Heels into the Final Four and all the way to the NCAA Championship Game, despite hyperextending his shooting elbow in the regional semifinal game against Notre Dame. Ford was named a consensus first team All-American at the end of the season.

In his senior season, Ford averaged 20.8 points and 5.7 assists per game, and scored a career-high 34 points in his final home game – a victory against Duke, which clinched another ACC first-place finish for the Tar Heels. At the end of the season, Ford repeated as a consensus first-team All-American and was recognized as the National Player of the Year when he won the USBWA, NABC and Sporting News Player of the Year awards, as well as the John R. Wooden Award.

== NBA career ==
Ford was the second overall pick in the first round of the NBA draft. While being coached by Cotton Fitzsimmons and forming a dynamic backcourt duo with Otis Birdsong which was noticed by many across the league, Ford was named NBA Rookie of the Year with the Kansas City Kings in 1979. During that season, on February 21, 1979, Ford recorded a career best 22 assists, while also scoring 26 points, grabbing 5 rebounds, and recording 5 steals, in a 133–117 win over the Milwaukee Bucks. During the 1980-81 NBA season, Ford scored a career high 38 points in a 113–107 win over the Houston Rockets on January 23, 1981. Just weeks later, Ford was forced to undergo surgery for a season ending eye injury, after which the Kings unexpectedly made it to the Western Conference Finals despite having a regular season record of 40–42. After the season, Ford struggled to return to his previous level of play, and was traded to the Nets, then traded to the Bucks, before being released and playing out his career on the Rockets.

In 482 NBA games, Ford scored 5,594 points, an 11.6 average, and had 3,083 assists, an average of 6.4 per game. He retired from the NBA in 1985.

== National team career ==
After his sophomore season, Ford was the starting point guard for the 1976 U.S. Olympic team, coached by Dean Smith, which won the gold medal. In six Olympic games, Ford totaled 54 assists for a 9.0 assists per game average.

== Style of play ==
Ford was known as an excellent ballhandler and penetrator who possessed a very accurate pull-up jump shot. He was also very adept at making free throws, especially in the final minutes of close games. His ballhandling and free-throw shooting skill allowed him to be at his best when running Carolina's Four Corners offense, an offensive strategy that some college teams used to either stall or score only when taking extremely safe shots. However, when Ford was dribbling the ball in the center of the four corners alignment, he often found teammates for quick, easy baskets or drew fouls on the other team. Coach Smith often employed this offense when UNC needed to protect a lead in the final minutes of a game, and Ford's abilities all but ensured that such a lead would be maintained. Ford also mastered the 360-degree spinning layup.

== Legacy ==
Ford is widely considered to be among the greatest college point guards of all time, and some contend he is still the greatest point guard ever to play in the ACC. He finished his career at Carolina as the all-time leading scorer in school history, with 2,290 points. He also set school and ACC career records for total assists, with 753 (a mark since broken by several other players). On December 18, 2008, Tyler Hansbrough surpassed Ford's career scoring total. He also finished his career as the only player in Atlantic Coast Conference history to score over 2,000 points and register at least 600 assists (a record now shared with Travis Best of Georgia Tech and Greivis Vásquez of Maryland). Ford was especially productive in ACC Tournament play, as he averaged 23.6 points per game in 8 career tournament contests.

In both his Junior and Senior years, Ford won the ACC Athlete of the Year award, making him one of just a few ACC athletes ever to win the award twice.

Ford was inducted into the North Carolina Sports Hall of Fame in May 1991. In 2002, Ford was named to the ACC 50th Anniversary men's basketball team honoring the fifty best players in ACC history.

== Career statistics ==
Legend
GP	Games played	GS	Games started	MPG	Minutes per game
FG%	Field goal percentage	3P%	3-point field goal percentage	FT%	Free throw percentage
RPG	Rebounds per game	APG	Assists per game	SPG	Steals per game
BPG	Blocks per game	PPG	Points per game	**Bold**	Career high

=== NBA ===
==== Regular season ====
Year	Team	GP	GS	MPG	FG%	3P%	FT%	RPG	APG	SPG	BPG	PPG
1978–79	Kansas City	79	—	34.5	.465	—	.813	**2.3**	8.6	**2.2**	**.1**	15.9
1979–80	Kansas City	**82**	—	32.0	.462	.174	.818	2.1	7.4	1.7	.0	16.2
1980–81	Kansas City	66	—	**34.7**	.478	**.306**	.831	1.9	**8.8**	1.5	**.1**	**17.5**
1981–82	Kansas City	72	**65**	27.1	.439	.219	.819	1.5	6.3	.9	.0	9.9
1982–83	New Jersey	7	7	23.3	**.571**	.000	.700	1.0	5.4	.9	.0	6.7
1982–83	Milwaukee	70	56	20.7	.471	.125	.796	1.4	3.6	.7	.0	6.8
1983–84	Houston	81	55	24.9	.502	.133	.838	1.7	5.1	.7	**.1**	7.1
1984–85	Houston	25	1	11.6	.298	.000	**.889**	1.1	2.4	.2	.0	1.8
Career		482	184	28.0	.467	.210	.820	1.8	6.4	1.2	.1	11.6

==== Playoffs ====
Year	Team	GP	GS	MPG	FG%	3P%	FT%	RPG	APG	SPG	BPG	PPG
1979	Kansas City	**8**	—	28.6	.263	—	.563	**2.4**	5.8	**2.4**	.0	7.8
1980	Kansas City	3	—	**36.7**	**.465**	**.750**	.818	2.0	**8.7**	1.7	.0	**17.3**
1981	Kansas City	5	—	31.6	.429	.000	.692	1.6	5.8	1.0	.0	7.8
1983	Milwaukee	2	—	2.5	.000	—	**1.000**	.0	.5	.0	.0	3.0
Career		15	—	27.7	.365	.600	.717	1.7	5.7	1.5	.0	9.1

=== College ===
Year	Team	GP	GS	MPG	FG%	3P%	FT%	RPG	APG	SPG	BPG	PPG
1974–75	North Carolina	31	—	—	.516	—	.783	2.7	5.2	—	—	16.4
1975–76	North Carolina	29	—	—	.532	—	.780	1.8	7.0	1.8	.0	18.6
1976–77	North Carolina	33	—	—	.534	—	.853	1.9	6.6	1.7	.0	18.7
1977–78	North Carolina	30	—	—	.527	—	.810	2.1	5.7	1.8	.1	20.8
Career		123	—	—	.527	—	.808	2.1	6.1	1.8	.1	18.6

== Coaching career ==
In 1988, he returned to North Carolina as an assistant coach, and helped lead the Tar Heels to the 1993 national title. After Smith retired in 1997, Ford became the top assistant to his successor, Bill Guthridge. Ford left the school following UNC's 1999–2000 season in which they reached the Final Four, along with the rest of Guthridge's staff, when Matt Doherty took over as head coach with his own coaching staff.

Ford currently works for the Educational Foundation, the fund-raising arm of the University of North Carolina athletic department. He also briefly served as color commentator on UNC basketball broadcasts.

Ford served as an assistant coach to Larry Brown for the Detroit Pistons (2004–2005). After a brief stint as an assistant coach to Isiah Thomas for the New York Knicks (2005–2007), Ford was retained in the same position by the Charlotte Bobcats' new head coach Larry Brown from June 2008 to 2010.
