= 1974–75 Yale Bulldogs men's basketball team =

American college basketball season

1974–75 Yale Bulldogs men's basketball
- Conference: Ivy League
- Record: 3–20 (2–12 Ivy)
- Head coach: Joe Vancisin (18th season)
- Home arena: John J. Lee Amphitheater

The 1974–75 Yale Bulldogs men's basketball team represented Yale University during the 1974–75 men's college basketball season. The Bulldogs, led by 18th year head coach Joe Vancisin, played their home games at John J. Lee Amphitheater of the Payne Whitney Gymnasium and were members of the Ivy League. They finished the season 3–20, 2–12 in Ivy League play to finish in last place.

== Schedule ==
Date time, TV	Rank^{#}	Opponent^{#}	Result	Record	Site city, state
November 30*		Connecticut	L 73–88	0–1	Payne Whitney Gymnasium; New Haven, CT
December 5*		at Fordham	L 57–72	0–2	Rose Hill Gymnasium; The Bronx, NY
December 7*		at Holy Cross	L 65–77	0–3	Worcester Auditorium; Worcester, Massachusetts
December 11		at Brown	L 66–92	0–4 (0–1)	Marvel Gymnasium; Providence, RI
December 21*		North Carolina	L 53–70	0–5 (0–1)	Payne Whitney Gymnasium; New Haven, CT
December 28*		at South Florida	L 60–69	0–6 (0–1)	
January 2*		at Stetson	L 66–79	0–7 (0–1)	Edmunds Center; DeLand, Florida
January 4*		at Biscayne	L 70–87	0–8 (0–1)	
January 10		Cornell	L 70–72	0–9 (0–2)	Payne Whitney Gymnasium; New Haven, CT
January 11		Columbia	W 78–69	1–9 (1–2)	Payne Whitney Gymnasium; New Haven, CT
January 18*		Lehigh	W 90–69	2–9 (1–2)	Payne Whitney Gymnasium; New Haven, CT
January 22*		Boston College	L 78–103	2–10 (1–2)	Payne Whitney Gymnasium; New Haven, CT
January 25		Brown	W 85–83 ^{OT}	3–10 (2–2)	Payne Whitney Gymnasium; New Haven, CT
January 31		Princeton	L 50–62	3–11 (2–3)	Payne Whitney Gymnasium; New Haven, CT
February 1		Penn	L 67–79	3–12 (2–4)	Payne Whitney Gymnasium; New Haven, CT
February 8		at Dartmouth	L 66–72	3–13 (2–5)	Alumni Gymnasium; Hanover, NH
February 9		at Harvard	L 64–81	3–14 (2–6)	Malkin Athletic Center; Cambridge, Massachusetts
February 14		at Columbia	L 74–78	3–15 (2–7)	Levien Gymnasium; New York City
February 15		at Cornell	L 65–75 ^{OT}	3–16 (2–8)	Barton Hall; Ithaca, NY
February 21		Dartmouth	L 73–79	3–17 (2–9)	Payne Whitney Gymnasium; New Haven, CT
February 22		Harvard	L 86–89 ^{OT}	3–18 (2–10)	Payne Whitney Gymnasium; New Haven, CT
February 28		at Penn	L 73–98	3–19 (2–11)	Palestra; Philadelphia, Pennsylvania
March 1		at Princeton	L 69–76	3–20 (2–12)	Jadwin Gymnasium; Princeton, NJ
*Non-conference game. ^{#}Rankings from AP Poll. (#) Tournament seedings in parentheses.
