= 1975 ACC men's basketball tournament =

- Classification: Division I
- Season: 1974–75
- Teams: 7
- Site: Greensboro Coliseum; Greensboro, North Carolina
- Champions: North Carolina (6th title)
- Winning coach: Dean Smith (5th title)
- MVP: Phil Ford (North Carolina)

1974–75 ACC men's basketball standings
	Conf.				Overall
Team	W		L	PCT	W		L	PCT
No. 5 Maryland	10	–	2	.833	24	–	5	.828
No. 9 North Carolina †	8	–	4	.667	23	–	8	.742
Clemson	8	–	4	.667	17	–	11	.607
No. 7 NC State	8	–	4	.667	22	–	6	.786
Virginia	4	–	8	.333	12	–	13	.480
Duke	2	–	10	.167	13	–	13	.500
Wake Forest	2	–	10	.167	13	–	13	.500
† 1975 ACC tournament winner Rankings from AP Poll

The 1975 Atlantic Coast Conference men's basketball tournament was held in Greensboro, North Carolina, at the Greensboro Coliseum from March 6–8. North Carolina defeated NC State, 70–66 to win the championship. Phil Ford of North Carolina was named the tournament MVP.

== Bracket ==
Quarterfinals; March 6
4	#8 NC State	91
5	Virginia	85
2	#12 North Carolina	101^{OT}
7	Wake Forest	100
3	#14 Clemson	78
6	Duke	76

Semifinals; March 7
1	#2 Maryland	85
4	#8 NC State	87
2	#12 North Carolina	76^{OT}
3	#14 Clemson	71

Championship Game; March 8
4	#8 NC State	66
2	#12 North Carolina	70
