= 1974–75 Duke Blue Devils men's basketball team =

American college basketball season

1974–75 Duke Blue Devils men's basketball
- Conference: Atlantic Coast Conference
- Record: 13–13 (2–10 ACC)
- Head coach: Bill Foster
- Home arena: Cameron Indoor Stadium; Durham, North Carolina

1974–75 ACC men's basketball standings
	Conf.				Overall
Team	W		L	PCT	W		L	PCT
No. 5 Maryland	10	–	2	.833	24	–	5	.828
No. 9 North Carolina †	8	–	4	.667	23	–	8	.742
Clemson	8	–	4	.667	17	–	11	.607
No. 7 NC State	8	–	4	.667	22	–	6	.786
Virginia	4	–	8	.333	12	–	13	.480
Duke	2	–	10	.167	13	–	13	.500
Wake Forest	2	–	10	.167	13	–	13	.500
† 1975 ACC tournament winner Rankings from AP Poll

The 1974–75 Duke Blue Devils men's basketball team represented Duke University in the 1974–75 NCAA Division I men's basketball season. The head coach was Bill Foster and the team finished the season with an overall record of 13–13 and did not qualify for the NCAA tournament.

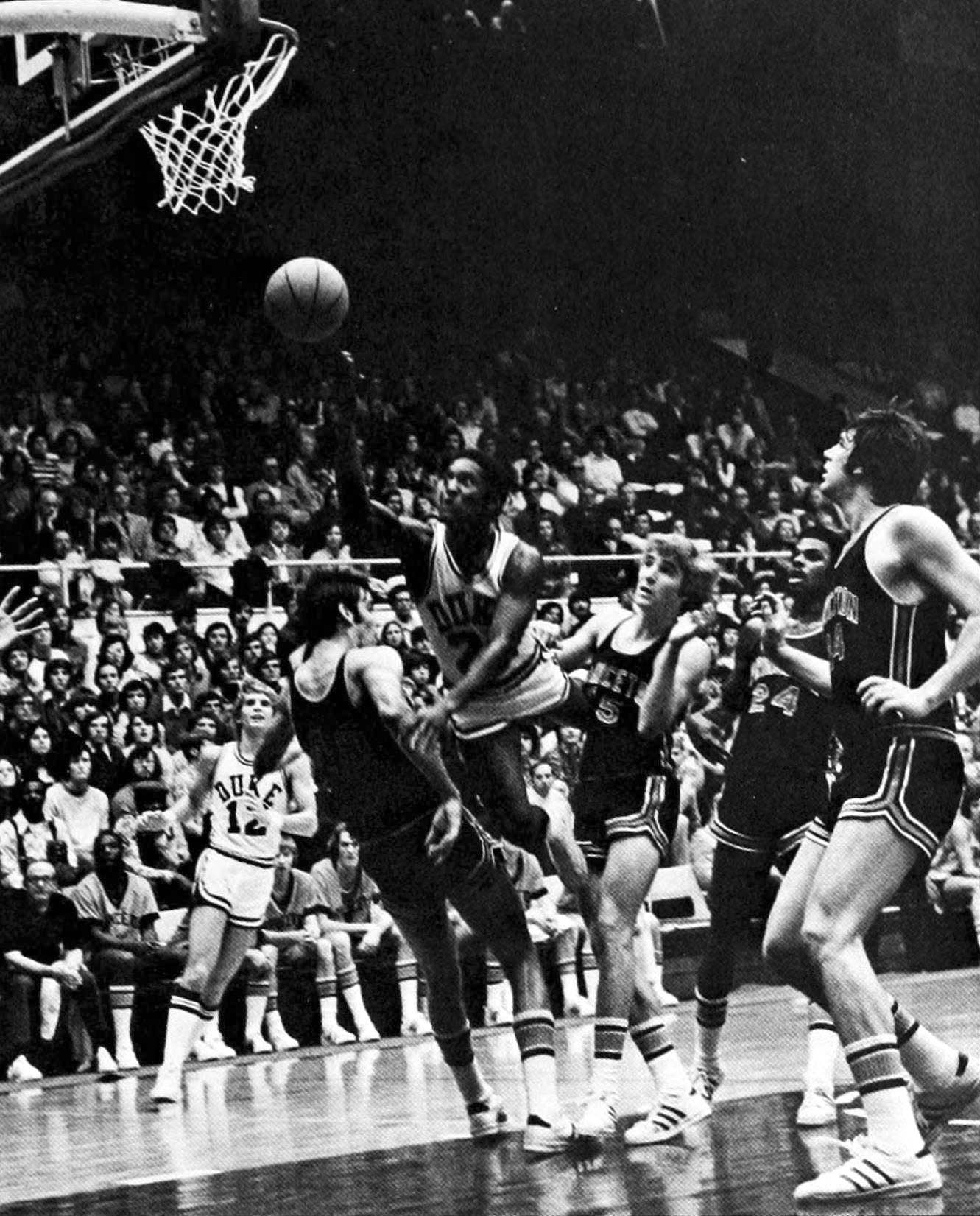
Princeton at Duke on January 25, 1975

== Roster ==
1974–75 Duke Blue Devils men's basketball team
Players
Coaches

Pos.	#	Name	Height	Weight	Year	Hometown
G	12	Tate Armstrong	6 ft 2 in (1.88 m)	180 lb (82 kg)	So	Houston, Texas
G	24	Kevin Billerman	6 ft 2 in (1.88 m)	170 lb (77 kg)	Sr	Bricktown, New Jersey
C	43	Terry Chili	6 ft 10 in (2.08 m)	215 lb (98 kg)	Jr	Jamestown, New York
F	25	Mark Crow	6 ft 7 in (2.01 m)	195 lb (88 kg)	So	Richmond, Virginia
F	42	Bob Fleischer	6 ft 8 in (2.03 m)	215 lb (98 kg)	Sr	Youngstown, Ohio
G	22	Paul Fox	6 ft 2 in (1.88 m)	170 lb (77 kg)	Jr	Radnor, Pennsylvania
G	11	Rick Gomez	6 ft 2 in (1.88 m)	195 lb (88 kg)	Fr	Roselle Park, New Jersey
F	14	Willie Hodge	6 ft 9 in (2.06 m)	210 lb (95 kg)	Jr	San Antonio, Texas
G	44	Pete Kramer	6 ft 4 in (1.93 m)	185 lb (84 kg)	Sr	Camp Hill, Pennsylvania
F	53	George Moses	6 ft 5 in (1.96 m)	225 lb (102 kg)	Jr	New York City, New York
G	20	Dave O'Connell	6 ft 4 in (1.93 m)	170 lb (77 kg)	Jr	Cincinnati, Ohio
F	23	Bill Suk	6 ft 5 in (1.96 m)	190 lb (86 kg)	Sr	Midlothian, Illinois
G	21	Ken Young	5 ft 10 in (1.78 m)	180 lb (82 kg)	Fr	Orange, New Jersey

Head coach

- Bill Foster (Elizabethtown)

Assistant coach(es)

Legend

- (C) Team captain
- (S) Suspended
- (I) Ineligible
- (W) Walk-on
- Injured
- Current redshirt

== Schedule ==
Date time, TV	Rank^{#}	Opponent^{#}	Result	Record	Site city, state
November 30, 1974*		Cornell	W 100–62	1–0	Cameron Indoor Stadium; Durham, N.C.
December 4, 1974*		East Carolina	W 79–73	2–0	Cameron Indoor Stadium; Durham, N.C.
December 20, 1974*		vs. Louisiana State; Carolina Classic	L 95–105	2–1	Carolina Coliseum; Columbia, S.C.
December 21, 1974*		vs. Princeton; Carolina Classic	W 66–57	3–1	Carolina Coliseum; Columbia, S.C.
December 27, 1974*		vs. Pittsburgh; Holiday Doubleheader	W 89–75	4–1	Reynolds Coliseum; Raleigh, N.C.
December 28, 1974*		vs. Kent State; Holiday Doubleheader	W 83–65	5–1	Reynolds Coliseum; Raleigh, N.C.
January 3, 1975		vs. No. 8 North Carolina; Big Four Tournament	W 99–96 ^{OT}	6–1	Greensboro Coliseum; Greensboro, N.C.
January 4, 1975		vs. No. 19 Wake Forest; Big Four Tournament	L 71–75	6–2	Greensboro Coliseum; Greensboro, N.C.
January 8, 1975		at No. 5 Maryland	L 77–83	6–3	
January 11, 1975*		South Florida	W 95–86	7–3	Cameron Indoor Stadium; Durham, N.C.
January 15, 1975		Clemson	W 75–72	8–3	Cameron Indoor Stadium; Durham, N.C.
January 18, 1975		at Virginia	L 56–60	8–4	
January 22, 1975		at Wake Forest	L 109–122	8–5	
January 25, 1975*		Princeton	W 90–73	9–5	Cameron Indoor Stadium; Durham, N.C.
January 27, 1975		No. 5 NC State	L 71–95	9–6	Cameron Indoor Stadium; Durham, N.C.
January 29, 1975*		at Davidson	W 113–76	10–6	
February 1, 1975		Virginia	L 85–92 ^{OT}	10–7	Cameron Indoor Stadium; Durham, N.C.
February 5, 1975		Wake Forest	W 75–68	11–7	Cameron Indoor Stadium; Durham, N.C.
February 8, 1975		No. 4 Maryland	L 80–104	11–8	Cameron Indoor Stadium; Durham, N.C.
February 10, 1975*		Duquesne	W 80–73	12–8	Cameron Indoor Stadium; Durham, N.C.
February 12, 1975		at No. 11 North Carolina	L 70–78	12–9	
February 15, 1975		at No. 18 Clemson	L 66–100	12–10	
February 19, 1975		at No. 4 NC State	L 78–92	12–11	
February 22, 1975		Georgia Tech	W 107–86	13–11	Cameron Indoor Stadium; Durham, N.C.
March 1, 1975		No. 14 North Carolina	L 70–74	13–12	Cameron Indoor Stadium; Durham, N.C.
March 6, 1975		vs. Clemson; ACC tournament	L 76–78	13–13	Greensboro Coliseum; Greensboro, N.C.
*Non-conference game. ^{#}Rankings from AP Poll. (#) Tournament seedings in parentheses. Source: Duke media guide
