= 1975 National Invitation Tournament =

United States college basketball tournament

- Season: 1974–75
- Teams: 16
- Finals site: Madison Square Garden, New York City
- Champions: Princeton Tigers (1st title)
- Runner-up: Providence Friars (4th title game)
- Semifinalists: Oregon Ducks (1st semifinal); St. John's Red Storm (14th semifinal)
- Winning coach: Pete Carril (1st title)
- MVP: Ron Lee (Oregon)

The 1975 National Invitation Tournament was the 38th edition of the oldest annual NCAA college basketball postseason tournament.

== Selected teams ==
Below is a list of the 16 teams selected for the tournament.

- Clemson
- Connecticut
- Holy Cross
- Lafayette
- Manhattan
- Massachusetts
- Memphis
- Oral Roberts
- Oregon
- Pittsburgh
- Princeton
- Providence
- Saint Peter's
- St. John's
- South Carolina
- Southern Illinois

== Bracket ==
Below is the tournament bracket.

First Round
Providence	91
Clemson	84
Pittsburgh	70
Southern Illinois	65
Manhattan	68
Massachusetts	51
St. John's	94
Lafayette	76
Oral Roberts	97
Memphis	95
Oregon	85
Saint Peter's	79
Princeton	84
Holy Cross	63
South Carolina	71
Connecticut	61

Quarterfinals
Providence	101
Pittsburgh	80
Manhattan	56
St. John's	57
Oral Roberts	59
Oregon	68
Princeton	86
South Carolina	67

Semifinals
Providence	85
St. John's	72
Oregon	57
Princeton	58

Final
Providence	69
Princeton	80

Third place game
St. John's	76
Oregon	80

== See also ==
- 1975 NCAA Division I basketball tournament
- 1975 NCAA Division II basketball tournament
- 1975 NCAA Division III basketball tournament
- 1975 NAIA Division I men's basketball tournament
- 1975 National Women's Invitational Tournament
