= 1974–75 NCAA Division I men's basketball rankings =

- Season: 1974–75
- NCAA Tournament: 1975
- Preseason No. 1: NC State
- NCAA Tournament Champions: UCLA
NCAA Division I men's basketball rankings


The 1974–75 NCAA Division I men's basketball rankings was made up of two human polls, the AP Poll and the Coaches Poll, in addition to various other preseason polls.

== Legend ==
	Increase in ranking
	Decrease in ranking
	New to rankings from previous week
Italics	Number of first place votes
(#–#)	Win–loss record
т	Tied with team above or below also with this symbol

== AP Poll ==
	Preseason	Week 1 Dec. 2	Week 2 Dec. 9	Week 3 Dec. 16	Week 4 Dec. 23	Week 5 Dec. 30	Week 6 Jan. 6	Week 7 Jan. 13	Week 8 Jan. 20	Week 9 Jan. 27	Week 10 Feb. 3	Week 11 Feb. 10	Week 12 Feb. 17	Week 13 Feb. 24	Week 14 Mar. 3	Week 15 Mar. 10	Week 16 Mar. 17	Week 17 Mar. 24	Final Mar. 31	
1.	NC State	NC State (1–0)	NC State (4–0)	NC State (5–0)	NC State (6–0)	NC State (8–0)	Indiana (12–0)	Indiana (14–0)	Indiana (16–0)	Indiana (18–0)	Indiana (20–0)	Indiana (22–0)	Indiana (24–0)	Indiana (26–0)	Indiana (28–0)	Indiana (29–0)	Indiana (30–0)	UCLA (26–3)	UCLA (28–3)	1.
2.	UCLA	UCLA (2–0)	UCLA (4–0)	Indiana (5–0)	Indiana (7–0)	Indiana (10–0)	UCLA (10–0)	UCLA (12–0)	Louisville (12–0)	NC State (12–2)	UCLA (15–2)	UCLA (17–2)	UCLA (19–2)	Maryland (19–3)	Maryland (22–3)	UCLA (23–3)	UCLA (24–3)	Kentucky (25–4)	Kentucky (26–5)	2.
3.	Indiana	Indiana (1–0)	Indiana (3–0)	UCLA (4–0)	UCLA (6–0)	UCLA (8–0)	Louisville (8–0)	Louisville (11–0)	Maryland (13–1)	Louisville (13–1)	Louisville (15–1)	Maryland (17–3)	Maryland (18–3)	Louisville (20–2)	Louisville (22–2)	Louisville (24–2)	Louisville (25–2)	Indiana (31–1)	Indiana (31–1)	3.
4.	Maryland	Maryland (1–0)	Louisville (2–0)	Louisville (3–0)	Louisville (4–0)	Louisville (7–0)	NC State (9–1)	NC State (10–1)	UCLA (13–1)	UCLA (14–2)	Maryland (14–3)	Kentucky (17–2)	NC State (18–3)	Kentucky (20–3)	UCLA (22–3)	Maryland (22–4)	Maryland (23–4)	Louisville (27–2)	Louisville (28–3)	4.
5.	Marquette	South Carolina (2–0)	Maryland (3–0)	Maryland (5–0)	Maryland (6–0)	USC (8–0)	Maryland (9–1)	Maryland (11–1)	NC State (11–2)	Kentucky (13–2)	Kentucky (15–2)	NC State (16–3)	Alabama (19–2)	UCLA (20–3)	Marquette (21–3)	Marquette (22–3)	Kentucky (23–4)	Maryland (24–5)	Maryland (24–5)	5.
6.	Kansas	Louisville (0–0)	USC (3–0)	Marquette (3–0)	USC (7–0)	Alabama (5–0)	USC (10–1)	USC (12–1)	Alabama (11–1)	USC (13–2)	NC State (13–3)	Louisville (16–2)	Louisville (17–2)	Marquette (20–3)	Kentucky (21–4)	Kentucky (22–4)	North Carolina (22–7)	Syracuse (23–7)	Syracuse (23–9)	6.
7.	South Carolina	Kansas (1–0)	Marquette (2–0)	USC (4–0)	Alabama (4–0)	Maryland (7–1)	Kentucky (8–1)	Alabama (9–1)	USC (13–2)	La Salle (16–1)	Alabama (15–2)	Alabama (17–2)	Kentucky (19–3)	NC State (19–4)	Alabama (22–3)	North Carolina (21–7)	Arizona State (24–3)	Arizona State (25–4)	NC State (22–6)	7.
8.	Louisville	Marquette (0–0)	North Carolina (3–0)	Alabama (3–0)	North Carolina (4–1)	North Carolina (5–1)	Alabama (7–1)	Oregon (10–1)	Oregon (12–1)	Maryland (13–3)	USC (13–3)	Arizona State (17–2)	Arizona State (19–2)	Alabama (20–3)	NC State (20–5)	Arizona State (23–3)	NC State (22–6)	NC State (22–6)	Arizona State (25–4)	8.
9.	Alabama	North Carolina (1–0)	Kansas (3–1)	Penn (5–0)	Penn (6–0)	Kentucky (7–1)	Oregon (9–0)	Arizona State (13–1)	La Salle (14–1)	Alabama (13–2)	Oregon (15–2)	Marquette (15–3)	Marquette (17–3)	Arizona State (20–3)	Arizona State (22–3)	NC State (22–6)	Notre Dame (19–8)	North Carolina (23–8)	North Carolina (23–8)	9.
10.	USC	USC (1–0)	Alabama (2–0)	North Carolina (3–1)	Arizona (7–0)	Providence (7–1)	Arizona (10–1)	Kentucky (9–2)	Arizona State (15–1)	North Carolina (10–4)	Arizona State (17–2)	USC (14–4)	USC (15–5)	Penn (20–4)	Penn (23–4)	Alabama (22–4)	Marquette (23–4)	Marquette (23–4)	Alabama (22–5)	10.
11.	North Carolina	Alabama (0–0)	Notre Dame (3–0)	Memphis State (4–0)	South Carolina (4–1)	Oregon (7–0)	Michigan (9–1)	La Salle (12–1)	Kentucky (11–2)	Oregon (12–2)	Marquette (13–3)	North Carolina (15–5)	Notre Dame (15–7)	Clemson (15–8)	USC (18–6)	Penn (23–4)	Alabama (22–5)	Alabama (22–5)	Marquette (23–4)	11.
12.	Notre Dame	Purdue (1–0)	Penn (3–0)	Notre Dame (4–1)	Providence (5–0)	Penn (7–1)	Arizona State (11–1)	Marquette (9–2)	Marquette (11–2)	Arizona State (16–2)	North Carolina (11–5)	La Salle (18–3)	Penn (18–4)	USC (16–6)	North Carolina (19–7)	Notre Dame (18–8)	Cincinnati (22–5)	Cincinnati (23–6)	Princeton (22–8)	12.
13.	Purdue	Notre Dame (1–0)	South Carolina (2–1)	Arizona (6–0)	Notre Dame (4–2)	Marquette (5–2)	Marquette (6–2)	Arizona (12–2)	Arizona (14–2)	Marquette (11–3)	La Salle (16–3)	Oregon (15–4)	North Carolina (15–6)	Creighton (19–4)	Creighton (19–4)	USC (18–7)	Oregon State (18–10)	Princeton (22–8)	Cincinnati (23–6)	13.
14.	Providence	Penn (2–0)	Memphis State (2–0)	South Carolina (2–1)	Marquette (3–2)	Arizona (8–1)	La Salle (10–1)	North Carolina (7–3)	North Carolina (8–4)	Auburn (10–3)	Notre Dame (11–6)	Penn (16–4)	Creighton (18–4)	North Carolina (16–7)	Clemson (16–9)	Clemson (17–10)	Drake (19–10)	Notre Dame (19–10)	Notre Dame (19–10)	14.
15.	Memphis State	Kentucky (1–0)	Purdue (2–1)	Purdue (5–1)	Purdue (5–1)	South Carolina (5–2)	North Carolina (5–3)	Providence (9–3)	Stanford (8–6)	Arizona (15–3)	Tennessee (12–3)	Texas–Pan American (19–1)	Arizona (17–4)	UTEP (18–4)	Oregon State (17–9)	Oregon State (17–10)	Penn (23–5)	Kansas State (20–9)	Kansas State (20–9)	15.
16.	Kentucky	Memphis State (1–0)	Michigan (2–0)	Providence (4–0)	Memphis State (6–1)	Arizona State (9–1)	South Carolina (6–3)	Minnesota (10–2)	Providence (10–3)	Notre Dame (9–6)	Clemson (11–7)	Notre Dame (12–7)	Clemson (13–8)	Notre Dame (16–8)	Notre Dame (18–8)	Rutgers (22–6)	UNLV (23–4)	Drake (20–10)	Drake (20–10)	16.
17.	Michigan	Providence (0–0)	Arizona (3–0)	Oklahoma (4–1)	Kentucky (5–1)	Michigan (7–1)	Minnesota (9–1)	Rutgers (10–2)	Minnesota (11–3)	Stanford (9–6)	Arizona (15–4)	Oregon State (13–8)	La Salle (19–4)	Oregon State (16–9)	Texas–Pan American (22–2)	Centenary (25–4)	Kansas State (19–8)	Penn (23–5)	UNLV (26–5)	17.
18.	Minnesota	Arizona (1–0)	Oregon (3–0)	Kansas (4–3)	Oklahoma (5–1)	Purdue (5–3)	Tennessee (7–1)	Tennessee (8–2)	Kansas (9–4)	Tennessee (11–3)	Creighton (15–4)	Clemson (11–8)	Centenary (22–3)	Texas–Pan American (21–2)	UTEP (19–5)	Cincinnati (21–4)	USC (18–8)	Centenary (25–4)	Oregon State (18–12)	18.
19.	Arizona	Michigan (1–0)	Oklahoma (2–1)	Oregon (4–0)	Oregon (4–0)	Memphis State (8–2)	Providence (7–3) т	Michigan (9–3)	Rutgers (10–3)	South Carolina (11–4)	Rutgers (14–4)	Arizona (15–4)	Texas–Pan American (20–2)	Arizona (18–5)	Arizona (20–5)	UTEP (22–2)	Centenary (25–4)	Michigan (19–8)	Michigan (19–8)	19.
20.	Penn	Houston (0–0)	Providence (2–0)	Kentucky (3–1)	Rutgers (7–1)	Notre Dame (4–3)	Wake Forest (7–3) т	South Carolina (8–3)	Auburn (8–3) т Purdue (10–4) т	Kansas (10–5)	Penn (14–4)	Creighton (15–4)	Oregon State (14–9)	Washington (16–7)	Rutgers (20–6)	Texas–Pan American (22–2)	Syracuse (21–7)	UNLV (24–5)	Providence (17–10)	20.
	Preseason	Week 1 Dec. 2	Week 2 Dec. 9	Week 3 Dec. 16	Week 4 Dec. 23	Week 5 Dec. 30	Week 6 Jan. 6	Week 7 Jan. 13	Week 8 Jan. 20	Week 9 Jan. 27	Week 10 Feb. 3	Week 11 Feb. 10	Week 12 Feb. 17	Week 13 Feb. 24	Week 14 Mar. 3	Week 15 Mar. 10	Week 16 Mar. 17	Week 17 Mar. 24	Final Mar. 31	
		Dropped: Minnesota	Dropped: Kentucky; Houston	Dropped: Michigan	Dropped: Kansas	Dropped: Oklahoma; Rutgers	Dropped: Penn; Purdue; Memphis State; Notre Dame	Dropped: Wake Forest	Dropped: Tennessee; Michigan; South Carolina (9–4)	Dropped: Providence; Minnesota; Rutgers; Purdue	Dropped: Auburn; Stanford; South Carolina; Kansas	Dropped: Tennessee; Rutgers	Dropped: Oregon	Dropped: La Salle; Centenary (24–4)	Dropped: Washington	Dropped: Creighton (20–6); Arizona (20–6)	Dropped: Clemson; Rutgers; UTEP; Texas–Pan American	Dropped: USC; Syracuse	Dropped: Penn; Centenary (25–4)	

== UPI Poll ==
	Week 2 Dec. 11	Week 3 Dec. 18	Week 4 Dec. 25	Week 5 Jan. 2	Week 6 Jan. 8	Week 7 Jan. 15	Week 8 Jan. 22	Week 9 Jan. 29	Week 10 Feb. 5	Week 11 Feb. 12	Week 12 Feb. 19	Week 13 Feb. 26	Week 14 Mar. 5	Final Mar. 12	
1.	NC State (4–0)	NC State (5–0)	NC State (6–0)	NC State (8–0)	Indiana (12–0)	Indiana (14–0)	Indiana (16–0)	Indiana (18–0)	Indiana (20–0)	Indiana (22–0)	Indiana (24–0)	Indiana (26–0)	Indiana (28–0)	Indiana (29–0)	1.
2.	UCLA (4–0)	Indiana (5–0)	Indiana (7–0)	Indiana (10–0)	UCLA (10–0)	UCLA (12–0)	UCLA (13–1)	NC State (12–2)	UCLA (15–2)	UCLA (17–2)	UCLA (19–2)	Maryland (19–3)	Maryland (22–3)	UCLA (23–3)	2.
3.	Indiana (3–0)	UCLA (4–0)	UCLA (6–0)	UCLA (8–0)	NC State (9–1)	NC State (10–1)	Louisville (12–0)	Louisville (13–1)	Louisville (15–1)	Maryland (17–3)	Maryland (18–3)	UCLA (20–3)	UCLA (22–3)	Louisville (24–2)	3.
4.	Louisville (2–0)	Louisville (3–0)	Louisville (4–0)	Louisville (7–0)	Louisville (8–0)	Louisville (11–0)	Maryland (13–1)	UCLA (14–2)	Maryland (14–3)	NC State (16–3)	NC State (18–3)	Louisville (20–2)	Louisville (22–2)	Kentucky (22–4)	4.
5.	North Carolina (3–0)	USC (4–0)	USC (7–0)	USC (8–0)	USC (10–1)	USC (12–1)	NC State (11–2)	Indiana (13–2)	Kentucky (15–2)	Kentucky (17–2)	Alabama (19–2)	Kentucky (20–3)	Alabama (22–3)	Maryland (22–4)	5.
6.	USC (3–0)	Maryland (5–0)	Alabama (4–0)	Alabama (5–0)	Maryland (9–1)	Maryland (11–1)	Alabama (11–1)	Alabama (13–2)	NC State (13–3)	Alabama (17–2)	Louisville (17–2)	NC State (19–4)	Kentucky (21–4)	Marquette (23–4)	6.
7.	Marquette (2–0)	Marquette (3–0)	Maryland (6–0)	Maryland (7–1)	Oregon (9–0)	Alabama (9–1)	USC (13–2)	Kentucky (13–2)	Alabama (15–2)	Louisville (16–2)	Arizona State (19–2)	Alabama (20–3) т	Marquette (21–3)	Arizona State (23–3)	7.
8.	Alabama (2–0)	Alabama (3–0)	North Carolina (4–1)	North Carolina (5–1)	Alabama (7–1)	Arizona State (13–1)	Arizona State (15–1)	Maryland (13–3)	USC (13–3)	Arizona State (17–2)	Kentucky (19–3)	Arizona State (20–3) т	Arizona State (22–3)	Alabama (22–4)	8.
9.	Kansas (3–1)	North Carolina (3–1)	Arizona State (8–0)	Kentucky (7–1)	Kentucky (8–1)	Oregon (10–1)	Oregon (12–1)	Arizona State (16–2)	Arizona State (17–2)	USC (14–4)	Marquette (17–3)	Marquette (20–3)	NC State (20–5)	NC State (22–6)	9.
10.	Maryland (3–0)	Arizona State (7–0)	South Carolina (4–1)	Oregon (7–0)	Arizona State (11–1)	Kentucky (9–2)	Kentucky (11–2)	La Salle (16–1)	Oregon (15–2)	North Carolina (15–5)	USC (15–5)	Oregon State (16–9)	Oregon State (17–9)	North Carolina (21–7)	10.
11.	Notre Dame (3–0)	Notre Dame (4–1)	Penn (6–0)	Arizona State (9–1)	Michigan (9–1)	La Salle (12–1)	La Salle (14–1)	North Carolina (10–4)	North Carolina (11–5)	Oregon State (13–8)	Oregon State (14–9)	UTEP (18–4)	USC (18–6)	Penn (23–4)	11.
12.	South Carolina (2–1)	Purdue (5–1)	Arizona (7–0)	South Carolina (5–2)	North Carolina (5–3)	Marquette (9–2)	Marquette (11–2)	Oregon (12–2)	Marquette (13–3)	Marquette (15–3)	North Carolina (15–6)	USC (16–6)	Penn (23–4)	USC (18–7)	12.
13.	Penn (3–0)	Arizona (6–0) т	Purdue (5–1)	Providence (7–1)	Arizona (10–1)	Arizona (12–2)	Arizona (14–2)	Arizona (15–3)	Arizona (15–4)	La Salle (18–3)	Arizona (17–4)	North Carolina (16–7)	North Carolina (19–7)	Utah State (21–5)	13.
14.	Arizona State (3–0)	South Carolina (5–0) т	Oregon (4–0)	Marquette (5–2)	Marquette (6–2)	North Carolina (7–3)	North Carolina (8–4)	South Carolina (11–4) т	Oregon State (12–7)	Arizona (15–4)	UTEP (16–4)	Penn (20–4)	Clemson (16–9)	UNLV (21–4)	14.
15.	Arizona (3–0)	Washington (6–0) т	Kentucky (5–1)	Michigan (7–1)	La Salle (10–1)	South Carolina (8–3)	South Carolina (9–4)	Creighton (13–4) т	Clemson (11–7)	UNLV (17–3)	Utah State (17–4)	Clemson (15–8)	Utah State (19–5)	Notre Dame (18–8)	15.
16.	Purdue (2–1) т	Oregon (4–0)	Providence (5–0)	Penn (7–1)	South Carolina (6–3) т	Tennessee (8–2)	UNLV (12–3)	UNLV (13–3)	Notre Dame (11–6)	Creighton (15–4)	La Salle (19–4)	Utah State (19–5) т	UTEP (19–5) т	Creighton (20–6)	16.
17.	Oregon State (4–0) т	Penn (5–0) т	Oklahoma (5–1)	Kansas (6–4)	Providence (7–3) т	Rutgers (10–2) т	Creighton (12–4)	Marquette (11–3) т	UNLV (15–3)	New Mexico State (16–5)	UNLV (18–4)	UNLV (20–4) т	UNLV (20–4) т	Arizona (20–6)	17.
18.	Memphis State (2–0)	Memphis State (4–0) т	Marquette (3–2)	Arizona (8–1)	Wake Forest (7–3) т	Bradley (8–3) т	Stanford (8–6)	Stanford (9–6) т	La Salle (16–3) т	South Carolina (13–6)	Notre Dame (15–7) т	Arizona (18–5) т	Creighton (19–4)	New Mexico State (20–6)	18.
19.	Michigan (2–0) т	Oklahoma (4–1)	Notre Dame (4–2)	Bradley (6–1)	Washington (9–2) т	New Mexico State (9–3) т	Kansas (9–4) т	Oregon State (12–6) т	Tennessee (12–3) т	Utah State (16–4)	Kansas (15–6) т	Washington (16–7) т	Cincinnati (20–5)	Clemson (17–10)	19.
20.	Oregon (3–0) т	Kentucky (3–1)	Rutgers (7–1)	Memphis State (8–2)	New Mexico State (9–2) т Rutgers (10–2) т	Penn (9–3) т	Utah (11–3) т	Notre Dame (9–6)	Creighton (15–4) т	UTEP (14–4)	South Carolina (15–6)	New Mexico State (19–5) т	Arizona (20–5)	UTEP (20–5)	20.
	Week 2 Dec. 11	Week 3 Dec. 18	Week 4 Dec. 25	Week 5 Jan. 2	Week 6 Jan. 8	Week 7 Jan. 15	Week 8 Jan. 22	Week 9 Jan. 29	Week 10 Feb. 5	Week 11 Feb. 12	Week 12 Feb. 19	Week 13 Feb. 26	Week 14 Mar. 5	Final Mar. 12	
		Dropped: Kansas; Oregon State; Michigan	Dropped: Washington; Memphis State (6–1)	Dropped: Purdue; Oklahoma; Notre Dame (4–3); Rutgers	Dropped: Penn; Kansas; Bradley; Memphis State	Dropped: Michigan; Providence (9–3); Wake Forest; Washington (9–3)	Dropped: Tennessee; Rutgers; Bradley; New Mexico State; Penn	Dropped: Kansas (10–5); Utah	Dropped: South Carolina; Stanford	Dropped: Oregon; Clemson; Notre Dame; Tennessee	Dropped: Creighton; New Mexico State	Dropped: La Salle; Notre Dame (16–8); Kansas; South Carolina	Dropped: Washington; New Mexico State	Dropped: Oregon State (17–10); Cincinnati (21–5)	
