= 1974–75 Kansas Jayhawks men's basketball team =

American college basketball season

1974–75 Kansas Jayhawks men's basketball

Big Eight Champions

NCAA Tournament, First Round
- Conference: Big Eight Conference
- Record: 19–8 (11–3 Big 8)
- Head coach: Ted Owens (11th season)
- Assistant coaches: Sam Miranda (9th season); Duncan Reid (2nd season)
- Captains: Dale Greenlee; Danny Knight
- Home arena: Allen Fieldhouse

1974–75 Big Eight Conference men's basketball standings
	Conf.				Overall
Team	W		L	PCT	W		L	PCT
Kansas	11	–	3	.786	19	–	8	.704
No. 15 Kansas State	10	–	4	.714	20	–	9	.690
Missouri	9	–	5	.643	18	–	9	.667
Nebraska	7	–	7	.500	14	–	12	.538
Oklahoma	6	–	8	.429	13	–	13	.500
Oklahoma State	5	–	9	.357	10	–	16	.385
Iowa State	4	–	10	.286	10	–	16	.385
Colorado	4	–	10	.286	7	–	19	.269
Rankings from AP Poll

The 1974–75 Kansas Jayhawks men's basketball team represented the University of Kansas during the 1974–75 NCAA Division I men's basketball season.

== Roster ==
- Rick Suttle
- Roger Morningstar
- Norm Cook
- Dale Greenlee
- Danny Knight
- Donnie Von Moore
- Clint Johnson
- Tommie Smith
- Ken Koenigs
- Milt Gibson
- Chris Barnthouse
- Marc Fletcher
- Jack Hollis
- Tom King
- Dale Ladner

== Schedule ==
Date time, TV	Rank^{#}	Opponent^{#}	Result	Record	Site city, state
November 30*	No. 6	Truman State	W 65-50	1-0	Allen Fieldhouse; Lawrence, KS
December 2*	No. 6	Augustana (SD)	W 85-50	2-0	Allen Fieldhouse; Lawrence, KS
December 6*	No. 7	No. 3 Indiana	L 70-74 ^{OT}	2-1	Allen Fieldhouse; Lawrence, KS
December 7*	No. 7	Iowa	W 89-54	3-1	Allen Fieldhouse; Lawrence, KS
December 9*	No. 7	at No. 13 Notre Dame	L 59-75	3-2	Joyce Center; Notre Dame, IN
December 13*	No. 9	Fordham	W 78-74	4-2	Allen Fieldhouse; Lawrence, KS
December 14*		Washington	L 64-74	4-3	Allen Fieldhouse; Lawrence, KS
December 23*	No. 18	vs. No. 20 Kentucky	L 63-100	4-4	Freedom Hall; Louisville, KY
December 26		vs. Oklahoma State	W 88-68	5-4	Kemper Arena; Kansas City, MO
December 28		vs. Nebraska	W 63-62	6-4	Kemper Arena; Kansas City, MO
December 30		vs. Iowa State	W 76-75	7-4	Kemper Arena; Kansas City, MO
January 6*		at Saint Louis	W 79-72	8-4	Kiel Auditorium; St. Louis, MO
January 18		Missouri; Border War	W 91-86	9-4 (1-0)	Allen Fieldhouse; Lawrence, KS
January 22	No. 18	at Iowa State	L 81-96	9-5 (1-1)	James H. Hilton Coliseum; Ames, IA
January 25	No. 18	Oklahoma State	W 71-60	10-5 (2-1)	Allen Fieldhouse; Lawrence, KS
January 29	No. 20	at Colorado	W 81-59	11-5 (3-1)	Allen Fieldhouse; Lawrence, KS
February 1	No. 20	at Kansas State; Sunflower Showdown	L 56-66	11-6 (3-2)	Ahearn Field House; Manhattan, KS
February 5		Nebraska	W 72-44	12-6 (4-2)	Allen Fieldhouse; Lawrence, KS
February 8		at Oklahoma	W 69-54	13-6 (5-2)	McCasland Field House; Norman, OK
February 12		Iowa State	W 76-62	14-6 (6-2)	Allen Fieldhouse; Lawrence, KS
February 15		at Oklahoma State	W 59-57	15-6 (7-2)	Gallagher-Iba Arena; Stillwater, OK
February 19		at Missouri; Border War	L 72-87	15-7 (7-3)	Hearnes Center; Columbia, MO
February 22		Kansas State; Sunflower Showdown	W 91-53	16-7 (8-3)	Allen Fieldhouse; Lawrence, KS
March 1		at Colorado	W 78-76	17-7 (9-3)	Balch Fieldhouse; Boulder, CO
March 5		at Nebraska	W 79-77	18-7 (10-3)	Nebraska Coliseum; Lincoln, NE
March 8		Oklahoma	W 74-63	19-7 (11-3)	Allen Fieldhouse; Lawrence, KS
March 15		vs. No. 12 Notre Dame; NCAA Midwest Regional Quarterfinals	L 71-77	19-8	Mabee Center; Tulsa, OK
*Non-conference game. ^{#}Rankings from AP Poll. (#) Tournament seedings in parentheses. Midwest=MW.
