= Brad Hoffman =

American basketball player

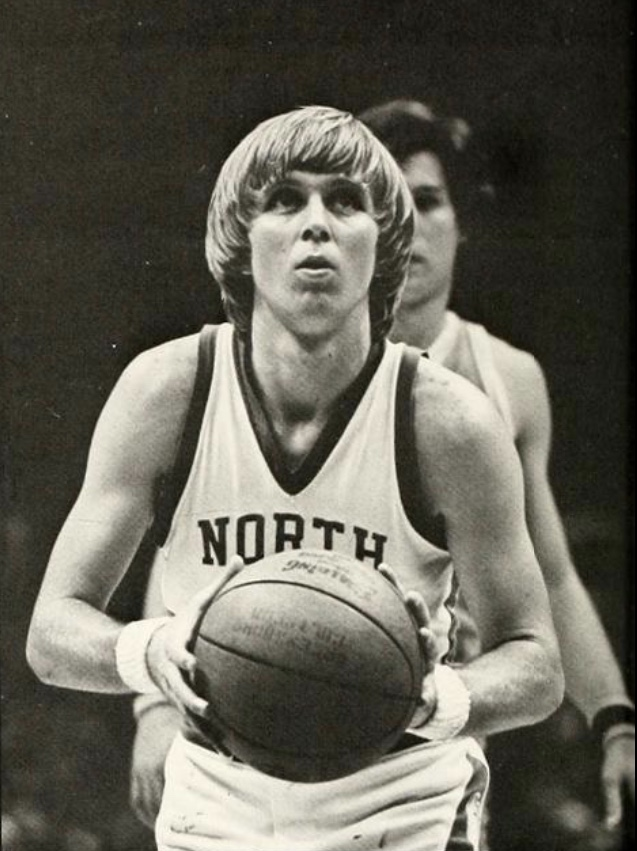
- Hoffman at UNC during his senior season.

Personal information
- Born: March 6, 1953 (age 73)
- Listed height: 5 ft 10 in (1.78 m)
- Listed weight: 152 lb (69 kg)

Career information
- High school: Walnut Ridge (Columbus, Ohio)
- College: North Carolina (1972–1975)
- NBA draft: 1975: undrafted
- Position: Point guard

Career history
- 1975–?: Athletes in Action

Brad Lee Hoffman (born March 6, 1953) is an American former basketball player who represented the United States in the 1978 FIBA World Championship. Hoffman played collegiately at the University of North Carolina.

Hoffman, a 5'10 guard from Columbus, Ohio, played for the North Carolina Tar Heels from 1972 to 1975. He played sparingly for his first two years, then became a regular rotation player for his senior season.

After graduating from UNC, Hoffman played basketball for Athletes in Action (AIA), a faith-based sports organization. In 1978, this move paid dividends for Hoffman as AIA was selected to represent the United States in the 1978 FIBA World Championships in Manila due to the timing of the tournament ruling out the participation of active college players. The U.S. finished fifth in the games with a 6–4 record. Hoffman finished fourth on the team in scoring, averaging 11.7 points per game in the ten tournament contests.
