= Maryland Terrapins men's basketball (1970–1979) =

American college basketball season

== 1969–70 ==
1969–70 Maryland Terrapins men's basketball
- Conference: Atlantic Coast Conference
- Record: 13–13 (5–9 ACC)
- Head coach: Lefty Driesell (1st season)
- Assistant coach: George Raveling
- Home arena: Cole Field House

1969–70 ACC men's basketball standings
	Conf.				Overall
Team	W		L	PCT	W		L	PCT
No. 6 South Carolina	14	–	0	1.000	25	–	3	.893
North Carolina	9	–	5	.643	18	–	9	.667
No. 10 NC State †	9	–	5	.643	23	–	7	.767
Duke	8	–	6	.571	17	–	9	.654
Wake Forest	6	–	8	.429	14	–	13	.519
Maryland	5	–	9	.357	13	–	13	.500
Virginia	3	–	11	.214	10	–	15	.400
Clemson	2	–	12	.143	7	–	19	.269
† 1970 ACC tournament winner Rankings from AP Poll

The year 1969 was a turning point in Washington sports history. The University of Maryland had hired Lefty Driesell to coach basketball. The Senators named Ted Williams as manager. The Washington Redskins hired Vince Lombardi as Head Coach and he had brought a winning attitude to the nation's capital. It marked a renaissance in sports interest in America's most transient of cities.

=== Personnel ===
1969–70 Maryland Terrapins men's basketball team
Players
Coaches

Pos.	#	Name	Height	Weight	Year	Hometown
F		Charlie Blank	6 ft 8 in (2.03 m)	—	So
		Tommy Findreng	6 ft 4 in (1.93 m)	—	Jr
F		Jay Flowers	6 ft 3 in (1.91 m)	—	So
F		Will Hetzel	6 ft 7 in (2.01 m)	—	Sr
C		Rod Horst	6 ft 6 in (1.98 m)	—	Sr
G		Steve Kebeck	6 ft 1 in (1.85 m)	—	Jr
F		Tom Milroy	6 ft 3 in (1.91 m)	—	Sr
G		Steve Norman	6 ft 1 in (1.85 m)	—	So
		Harvey Sanders	6 ft 0 in (1.83 m)	—	So
C		Sparky Still	6 ft 7 in (2.01 m)	—	So
F		Dick Stobaugh	6 ft 7 in (2.01 m)	—	Jr
		Al Thomas	6 ft 2 in (1.88 m)	—	Jr
G		Mickey Wiles	5 ft 11 in (1.8 m)	—	Sr

Head coach

- Lefty Driesell

Assistant coach(es)

Legend

- (C) Team captain
- (S) Suspended
- (I) Ineligible
- (W) Walk-on
- Injured
- Current redshirt

=== NBA draft ===
Round	Pick	Player	NBA club
9	151	Will Hetzel	Baltimore Bullets

== 1970–71 ==
1970–71 Maryland Terrapins men's basketball
- Conference: Atlantic Coast Conference
- Record: 14–12 (5–9 ACC)
- Head coach: Lefty Driesell (2nd season)
- Assistant coach: George Raveling
- Home arena: Cole Field House

1970–71 ACC men's basketball standings
	Conf.				Overall
Team	W		L	PCT	W		L	PCT
No. 13 North Carolina	11	–	3	.786	26	–	6	.813
No. 6 South Carolina †	10	–	4	.714	23	–	6	.793
Duke	9	–	5	.643	20	–	10	.667
Wake Forest	7	–	7	.500	16	–	10	.615
Virginia	6	–	8	.429	15	–	11	.577
NC State	5	–	9	.357	13	–	14	.481
Maryland	5	–	9	.357	14	–	12	.538
Clemson	3	–	11	.214	9	–	17	.346
† 1971 ACC tournament winner Rankings from AP Poll

=== NBA draft ===
Round	Pick	Player	NBA club
8	131	Barry Yates	Philadelphia 76ers

== 1971–72 ==
1971–72 Maryland Terrapins men's basketball

NIT Champions

National Invitation Tournament, champions
- Conference: Atlantic Coast Conference

Ranking
- Coaches: No. 11
- AP: No. 14
- Record: 27–5 (8–4 ACC)
- Head coach: Lefty Driesell (3rd season)
- Assistant coach: George Raveling
- Home arena: Cole Field House

1971–72 ACC men's basketball standings
	Conf.				Overall
Team	W		L	PCT	W		L	PCT
No. 2 North Carolina †	9	–	3	.750	26	–	5	.839
No. 14 Maryland	8	–	4	.667	27	–	5	.844
No. 20 Virginia	8	–	4	.667	21	–	7	.750
Duke	6	–	6	.500	14	–	12	.538
NC State	6	–	6	.500	16	–	10	.615
Wake Forest	3	–	9	.250	8	–	18	.308
Clemson	2	–	10	.167	10	–	16	.385
† 1972 ACC tournament winner Rankings from AP Poll

Lefty Driesell started the tradition of Midnight Madnessin 1971 with an unofficial session that was attended by 3,000 fans at the University of Maryland's football stadium, Byrd Stadium.

=== National Invitation tournament ===
- First Round
  - Maryland 67, St. Josephs 55
- Second Round
  - Maryland 71, Syracuse 65
- Semifinal
  - Maryland 91, Jacksonville 77
- Final
  - Maryland 100, Niagara 69

=== Awards and honors ===
- Tom McMillen, NIT Most Valuable Player
- Tom McMillen, First Team All ACC
- Tom McMillen, Third Team All-American

In April 1972, assistant George Raveling became the head coach at Washington State in the Pac-8 Conference.

== 1972–73 ==
1972–73 Maryland Terrapins men's basketball

NCAA tournament, Elite Eight
- Conference: Atlantic Coast Conference

Ranking
- Coaches: No. 10
- AP: No. 8
- Record: 23–7 (7–5 ACC)
- Head coach: Lefty Driesell (4th season)
- Home arena: Cole Field House

1972–73 ACC men's basketball standings
	Conf.				Overall
Team	W		L	PCT	W		L	PCT
No. 2 NC State †	12	–	0	1.000	27	–	0	1.000
No. 11 North Carolina	8	–	4	.667	25	–	8	.758
No. 8 Maryland	7	–	5	.583	23	–	7	.767
Duke	4	–	8	.333	12	–	14	.462
Virginia	4	–	8	.333	13	–	12	.520
Clemson	4	–	8	.333	12	–	14	.462
Wake Forest	3	–	9	.250	12	–	15	.444
† 1973 ACC tournament winner Rankings from AP Poll

In the offseason, Tom McMillen was a member of the US national team that took part in Basketball at the 1972 Summer Olympics.

=== NCAA tournament ===
- East
  - Maryland 91, Syracuse 75
  - Providence 103, Maryland 89

=== Awards and honors ===
- Tom McMillen, Second Team All-American
- Tom McMillen, First Team All ACC

=== NBA draft ===
Round	Pick	Player	NBA club
3	37	Jim O’Brien	Cleveland Cavaliers
10	155	Bob Bodell	Seattle SuperSonics
14	186	Howard White	Capitol Bullets

== 1973–74 ==
1973–74 Maryland Terrapins men's basketball
- Conference: Atlantic Coast Conference

Ranking
- Coaches: No. 4
- AP: No. 4
- Record: 23–5 (9–3 ACC)
- Head coach: Lefty Driesell (5th season)
- Home arena: Cole Field House

1973–74 ACC men's basketball standings
	Conf.				Overall
Team	W		L	PCT	W		L	PCT
No. 1 NC State †	12	–	0	1.000	30	–	1	.968
No. 4 Maryland	9	–	3	.750	23	–	5	.821
No. 12 North Carolina	9	–	3	.750	22	–	6	.786
Virginia	4	–	8	.333	11	–	16	.407
Clemson	3	–	9	.250	14	–	12	.538
Wake Forest	3	–	9	.250	13	–	13	.500
Duke	2	–	10	.167	10	–	16	.385
† 1974 ACC tournament winner Rankings from AP Poll

Maryland participated in the ACC Final. The Final pitted two of the top teams in the country. It has been regarded by many to be the greatest ACC game in history — and one of the greatest college games ever. The game was instrumental in forcing the expansion of the NCAA Men's Division I Basketball Championship to 32 teams, allowing more than one bid from a conference. Maryland had six future NBA draft picks on the team. The six picks were Tom McMillen and Len Elmore (1974), Tom Roy and Owen Brown (1975) and John Lucas and Mo Howard (1976). It is considered the greatest team that did not participate in the NCAA tournament.

=== ACC tournament ===
The 1974 Atlantic Coast Conference men's basketball tournament was held in Greensboro, North Carolina at the Greensboro Coliseum from March 7–9. North Carolina State defeated Maryland in overtime 103–100 to claim the championship.

- Quarterfinals (March 7): Maryland 85, Duke 66
- Semifinals (March 8): Maryland 105, North Carolina 85
- Finals (March 9): NC State 103, Maryland 100

=== Awards and honors ===
- Lefty Driesell, NCAA Award of Valor
- Len Elmore, First Team All ACC
- Len Elmore, Second Team All-American
- John Lucas, First Team All ACC
- John Lucas, Second Team All-American
- Tom McMillen, Second Team All-American

=== NBA draft ===
Round	Pick	Player	NBA club
1	9	Tom McMillen	Buffalo Braves
1	13	Len Elmore	Washington Bullets

== 1974–75 ==
1974–75 Maryland Terrapins men's basketball

NCAA tournament, Elite Eight
- Conference: Atlantic Coast Conference

Ranking
- Coaches: No. 5
- AP: No. 5
- Record: 24–5 (10–2 ACC)
- Head coach: Lefty Driesell (6th season)
- Home arena: Cole Field House

1974–75 ACC men's basketball standings
	Conf.				Overall
Team	W		L	PCT	W		L	PCT
No. 5 Maryland	10	–	2	.833	24	–	5	.828
No. 9 North Carolina †	8	–	4	.667	23	–	8	.742
Clemson	8	–	4	.667	17	–	11	.607
No. 7 NC State	8	–	4	.667	22	–	6	.786
Virginia	4	–	8	.333	12	–	13	.480
Duke	2	–	10	.167	13	–	13	.500
Wake Forest	2	–	10	.167	13	–	13	.500
† 1975 ACC tournament winner Rankings from AP Poll

In the offseason, John Lucas played for the US national team in the 1974 FIBA World Championship, winning the bronze medal.

=== NCAA tournament ===
- Midwest
  - Maryland 83, Creighton 79
  - Maryland 83, Notre Dame 71
  - Louisville 96, Maryland 82

=== Awards and honors ===
- John Lucas, First Team All-American
- John Lucas, First Team All ACC
- FIBA Intercontinental Cup Champions, 1974 FIBA Intercontinental Cup

=== NBA draft ===
Round	Pick	Player	NBA club
3	42	Tom Roy	Portland Trail Blazers
9	147	Owen Brown	Phoenix Suns

== 1975–76 ==
1975–76 Maryland Terrapins men's basketball
- Conference: Atlantic Coast Conference

Ranking
- Coaches: No. 13
- AP: No. 11
- Record: 22–6 (7–5 ACC)
- Head coach: Lefty Driesell (7th season)
- Home arena: Cole Field House

1975–76 ACC men's basketball standings
	Conf.				Overall
Team	W		L	PCT	W		L	PCT
No. 8 North Carolina	11	–	1	.917	25	–	4	.862
No. 11 Maryland	7	–	5	.583	22	–	6	.786
NC State	7	–	5	.583	21	–	9	.700
Clemson	5	–	7	.417	18	–	10	.643
Wake Forest	5	–	7	.417	17	–	10	.630
No. 18 Virginia †	4	–	8	.333	18	–	12	.600
Duke	3	–	9	.250	13	–	14	.481
† 1976 ACC tournament winner Rankings from AP Poll

=== Awards and honors ===
- John Lucas, First Team All-American
- John Lucas, First Team All ACC

=== NBA draft ===
Round	Pick	Player	NBA club
1	1	John Lucas	Houston Rockets
2	32	Mo Howard	Cleveland Cavaliers

== 1976–77 ==
1976–77 Maryland Terrapins men's basketball
- Conference: Atlantic Coast Conference
- Record: 19–8 (7–5 ACC)
- Head coach: Lefty Driesell (8th season)
- Home arena: Cole Field House

1976–77 ACC men's basketball standings
	Conf.				Overall
Team	W		L	PCT	W		L	PCT
No. 5 North Carolina†	9	–	3	.750	28	–	5	.848
No. 9 Wake Forest	8	–	4	.667	22	–	8	.733
Clemson	8	–	4	.667	22	–	6	.786
Maryland	7	–	5	.583	19	–	8	.704
NC State	6	–	6	.500	17	–	11	.607
Virginia	2	–	10	.167	12	–	17	.414
Duke	2	–	10	.167	14	–	13	.519
† 1977 ACC tournament winner Rankings from AP Poll

=== NBA draft ===
Round	Pick	Player	NBA club
1	15	Brad Davis	Los Angeles Lakers
2	30	Steve Sheppard	Chicago Bulls

== 1977–78 ==
1977–78 Maryland Terrapins men's basketball
- Conference: Atlantic Coast Conference
- Record: 15–13 (3–9 ACC)
- Head coach: Lefty Driesell (9th season)
- Home arena: Cole Field House

1977–78 ACC men's basketball standings
	Conf.				Overall
Team	W		L	PCT	W		L	PCT
No. 16 North Carolina	9	–	3	.750	23	–	8	.742
No. 7 Duke †	8	–	4	.667	27	–	7	.794
NC State	7	–	5	.583	21	–	10	.677
Virginia	6	–	6	.500	20	–	8	.714
Wake Forest	6	–	6	.500	19	–	10	.655
Maryland	3	–	9	.250	15	–	13	.536
Clemson	3	–	9	.250	15	–	12	.556
† 1978 ACC tournament winner Rankings from AP Poll

=== NBA draft ===
Round	Pick	Player	NBA club
4	81	Larry Boston	Washington Bullets

== 1978–79 ==
1978–79 Maryland Terrapins men's basketball

National Invitation Tournament
- Conference: Atlantic Coast Conference
- Record: 19–11 (6–6 ACC)
- Head coach: Lefty Driesell (10th season)
- Home arena: Cole Field House

1978–79 ACC men's basketball standings
	Conf.				Overall
Team	W		L	PCT	W		L	PCT
No. 9 North Carolina †	9	–	3	.750	23	–	6	.793
No. 11 Duke	9	–	3	.750	22	–	8	.733
Virginia	7	–	5	.583	19	–	10	.655
Maryland	6	–	6	.500	19	–	11	.633
Clemson	5	–	7	.417	19	–	10	.655
NC State	3	–	9	.250	18	–	12	.600
Wake Forest	3	–	9	.250	12	–	15	.444
† 1979 ACC tournament winner Rankings from AP Poll

=== NBA draft ===
Round	Pick	Player	NBA club
3	52	Larry Gibson	Milwaukee Bucks
