= Jimmy Taylor (basketball) =

American basketball coach

Jimmy Taylor was a college basketball coach. From 1970 to 1975, he served as the head coach at South Alabama, where he compiled a 75-53 (.586) record.
