= Clemson Tigers men's basketball, 1970–1979 =

The Clemson Tigers men's basketball teams of 1970–1979 represented Clemson University in NCAA college basketball competition.

== 1969–70 ==
1969–70 Clemson Tigers men's basketball
- Conference: Atlantic Coast Conference
- Record: 7–19 (2–12 ACC)
- Head coach: Bobby Roberts
- Home arena: Littlejohn Coliseum

1969–70 ACC men's basketball standings
	Conf.				Overall
Team	W		L	PCT	W		L	PCT
No. 6 South Carolina	14	–	0	1.000	25	–	3	.893
North Carolina	9	–	5	.643	18	–	9	.667
No. 10 NC State †	9	–	5	.643	23	–	7	.767
Duke	8	–	6	.571	17	–	9	.654
Wake Forest	6	–	8	.429	14	–	13	.519
Maryland	5	–	9	.357	13	–	13	.500
Virginia	3	–	11	.214	10	–	15	.400
Clemson	2	–	12	.143	7	–	19	.269
† 1970 ACC tournament winner Rankings from AP Poll

Date	Opponent	Site	Result
December 4*	Auburn	Littlejohn Coliseum • Clemson, SC	L 60–61
December 17*	Alabama	Littlejohn Coliseum • Clemson, SC	W 104–95
December 20*	vs. #15 LSU	Charlotte, NC	L 103–111
December 22*	vs. Texas–El Paso	El Paso, TX (Sun Bowl Carnival Semifinal)	L 82–90
December 23*	vs. Texas A&M	El Paso, TX (Sun Bowl Carnival Consolation)	L 63–78
January 7*	at Georgia Tech	Alexander Memorial Coliseum • Atlanta, GA	L 84–96
January 10	Virginia	Littlejohn Coliseum • Clemson, SC	W 104–87
January 12	Maryland	Littlejohn Coliseum • Clemson, SC	L 68–75
January 15	#7 North Carolina	Littlejohn Coliseum • Clemson, SC	L 91–96
January 17*	at Furman	Alley Gymnasium • Greenville, SC	W 81–80
January 19*	Georgia Tech	Littlejohn Coliseum • Clemson, SC	W 88–78
January 22*	at Florida State	Tully Gymnasium • Tallahassee, FL	L 81–122
January 24*	Virginia Tech	Littlejohn Coliseum • Clemson, SC	W 87–79
January 26	#3 South Carolina	Littlejohn Coliseum • Clemson, SC	L 76–97
January 28*	Furman	Littlejohn Coliseum • Clemson, SC	W 93–67
January 31	at #8 NC State	Reynolds Coliseum • Raleigh, NC	L 87–119
February 4	Duke	Littlejohn Coliseum • Clemson, SC	L 88–92
February 7	at #2 South Carolina	Carolina Coliseum • Columbia, SC	L 52–99
February 9	at Duke	Duke Indoor Stadium • Durham, NC	L 75–91
February 13	vs. #10 North Carolina	Charlotte Coliseum • Charlotte, NC (North–South Doubleheader)	L 66–110
February 14	vs. #5 NC State	Charlotte Coliseum • Charlotte, NC (North–South Doubleheader)	L 84–102
February 18	at Wake Forest	Winston–Salem Memorial Coliseum • Winston-Salem, NC	L 71–97
February 21	at Virginia	University Hall • Charlottesville, VA	L 79–94
February 23	at Maryland	Cole Field House • College Park, MD	L 85–103
February 28	Wake Forest	Littlejohn Coliseum • Clemson, SC	W 105–95
March 5*	vs. #3 South Carolina	Charlotte Coliseum • Charlotte, NC (ACC Tournament Quarterfinal)	L 33–34
*Non-Conference Game. #Rankings from AP Poll released prior to game.

== 1970–71 ==
1970–71 Clemson Tigers men's basketball
- Conference: Atlantic Coast Conference
- Record: 9–17 (3–11 ACC)
- Head coach: Tates Locke
- Home arena: Littlejohn Coliseum

1970–71 ACC men's basketball standings
	Conf.				Overall
Team	W		L	PCT	W		L	PCT
No. 13 North Carolina	11	–	3	.786	26	–	6	.813
No. 6 South Carolina †	10	–	4	.714	23	–	6	.793
Duke	9	–	5	.643	20	–	10	.667
Wake Forest	7	–	7	.500	16	–	10	.615
Virginia	6	–	8	.429	15	–	11	.577
NC State	5	–	9	.357	13	–	14	.481
Maryland	5	–	9	.357	14	–	12	.538
Clemson	3	–	11	.214	9	–	17	.346
† 1971 ACC tournament winner Rankings from AP Poll

Date	Opponent	Site	Result
December 3*	Furman	Littlejohn Coliseum • Clemson, SC	W 67–54
December 5*	Mercer	Littlejohn Coliseum • Clemson, SC	W 61–46
December 18*	at Vanderbilt	Memorial Gymnasium • Nashville, TN (Music City Classic Semifinal)	L 61–75
December 19*	vs. Southern Methodist	Memorial Gymnasium • Nashville, TN (Music City Classic Consolation)	W 67–51
January 2	at #2 South Carolina	Carolina Coliseum • Columbia, SC	L 53–81
January 6*	at Georgia Tech	Alexander Memorial Coliseum • Atlanta, GA	L 55–72
January 9	at Virginia	University Hall • Charlottesville, VA	L 56–66
January 11	at Maryland	Cole Field House • College Park, MD	L 52–56
January 14	at #15 North Carolina	Carmichael Auditorium • Chapel Hill, NC	L 72–92
January 16	Duke	Littlejohn Coliseum • Clemson, SC	L 56–82
January 18	NC State	Littlejohn Coliseum • Clemson, SC	W 59–50
January 20*	Georgia Tech	Littlejohn Coliseum • Clemson, SC	L 64–74
January 23*	at Virginia Tech	VPI Coliseum • Blacksburg, VA	L 66–76
January 28	#15 Virginia	Littlejohn Coliseum • Clemson, SC	W 45–44
January 30*	Indiana State	Littlejohn Coliseum • Clemson, SC	W 91–87 (OT)
February 1*	at Furman	Alley Gymnasium • Greenville, SC	L 61–77
February 6	#7 South Carolina	Littlejohn Coliseum • Clemson, SC	L 44–47
February 8*	Rollins	Littlejohn Coliseum • Clemson, SC	W 77–52
February 12	vs. NC State	Charlotte Coliseum • Charlotte, NC (North–South Doubleheader)	L 57–64 (OT)
February 13	vs. #11 North Carolina	Charlotte Coliseum • Charlotte, NC (North–South Doubleheader)	L 48–86
February 16	at Wake Forest	Winston–Salem Memorial Coliseum • Winston-Salem, NC	L 57–74
February 20*	Virginia Tech	Littlejohn Coliseum • Clemson, SC	W 56–53
February 23	Maryland	Littlejohn Coliseum • Clemson, SC	W 51–45 (OT)
February 26	Wake Forest	Littlejohn Coliseum • Clemson, SC	L 54–64
March 2	at Duke	Duke Indoor Stadium • Durham, NC	L 60–70
March 11*	vs. #13 North Carolina	Greensboro Coliseum • Greensboro, NC (ACC Tournament Quarterfinal)	L 41–76
*Non-Conference Game. #Rankings from AP Poll released prior to game.

== 1971–72 ==
1971–72 Clemson Tigers men's basketball

Poinsettia Classic Champions
- Conference: Atlantic Coast Conference
- Record: 10–16 (2–10 ACC)
- Head coach: Tates Locke
- Home arena: Littlejohn Coliseum

1971–72 ACC men's basketball standings
	Conf.				Overall
Team	W		L	PCT	W		L	PCT
No. 2 North Carolina †	9	–	3	.750	26	–	5	.839
No. 14 Maryland	8	–	4	.667	27	–	5	.844
No. 20 Virginia	8	–	4	.667	21	–	7	.750
Duke	6	–	6	.500	14	–	12	.538
NC State	6	–	6	.500	16	–	10	.615
Wake Forest	3	–	9	.250	8	–	18	.308
Clemson	2	–	10	.167	10	–	16	.385
† 1972 ACC tournament winner Rankings from AP Poll

Date	Opponent	Site	Result
December 4*	at Davidson	Charlotte Coliseum • Charlotte, NC	L 65–76
December 11*	Purdue	Littlejohn Coliseum • Clemson, SC	W 72–66 (OT)
December 18*	at Indiana State	Terre Haute, IN	W 82–77 (OT)
December 21*	at Cincinnati	Armory Fieldhouse • Cincinnati, OH	L 64–93
December 29*	vs. Holy Cross	Greenville, SC (Poinsettia Classic Semifinal)	W 67–49
December 30*	vs. Auburn	Greenville, SC (Poinsettia Classic Final)	W 77–67
January 5*	at Georgia Tech	Alexander Memorial Coliseum • Atlanta, GA	W 66–57
January 8	#12 Maryland	Littlejohn Coliseum • Clemson, SC	W 63–61
January 12	#3 North Carolina	Littlejohn Coliseum • Clemson, SC	L 61–81
January 15	at Duke	Duke Indoor Stadium • Durham, NC	L 69–71
January 17	at NC State	Reynolds Coliseum • Raleigh, NC	L 46–58
January 19*	Furman	Littlejohn Coliseum • Clemson, SC	W 74–72
January 22*	Virginia Tech	Littlejohn Coliseum • Clemson, SC	W 85–73
January 29*	Georgia Tech	Littlejohn Coliseum • Clemson, SC	W 83–70
January 31	#8 Virginia	Littlejohn Coliseum • Clemson, SC	L 58–62
February 2*	at Virginia Tech	VPI Coliseum • Blacksburg, VA	L 44–48
February 5*	#8 South Carolina	Littlejohn Coliseum • Clemson, SC	L 58–62
February 11	vs. #3 North Carolina	Charlotte Coliseum • Charlotte, NC (North–South Doubleheader)	L 50–73
February 12	vs. NC State	Charlotte Coliseum • Charlotte, NC (North–South Doubleheader)	L 59–74
February 16	at Wake Forest	Winston–Salem Memorial Coliseum • Winston-Salem, NC	L 51–59
February 19	at #19 Maryland	Cole Field House • College Park, MD	L 57–67
February 21	at #6 Virginia	University Hall • Charlottesville, VA	L 60–62
February 26	Wake Forest	Littlejohn Coliseum • Clemson, SC	L 63–70
March 1	Duke	Littlejohn Coliseum • Clemson, SC	W 59–40
March 4*	at #8 South Carolina	Carolina Coliseum • Columbia, SC	L 61–77
March 9*	vs. #13 Maryland	Greensboro Coliseum • Greensboro, NC (ACC Tournament Quarterfinal)	L 52–54
*Non-Conference Game. #Rankings from AP Poll released prior to game.

== 1972–73 ==
1972–73 Clemson Tigers men's basketball
- Conference: Atlantic Coast Conference
- Record: 12–14 (4–8 ACC)
- Head coach: Tates Locke
- Home arena: Littlejohn Coliseum

1972–73 ACC men's basketball standings
	Conf.				Overall
Team	W		L	PCT	W		L	PCT
No. 2 NC State †	12	–	0	1.000	27	–	0	1.000
No. 11 North Carolina	8	–	4	.667	25	–	8	.758
No. 8 Maryland	7	–	5	.583	23	–	7	.767
Duke	4	–	8	.333	12	–	14	.462
Virginia	4	–	8	.333	13	–	12	.520
Clemson	4	–	8	.333	12	–	14	.462
Wake Forest	3	–	9	.250	12	–	15	.444
† 1973 ACC tournament winner Rankings from AP Poll

Date	Opponent	Site	Result
November 28*	Georgia Tech	Littlejohn Coliseum • Clemson, SC	W 86–77
December 2*	at Davidson	Charlotte Coliseum • Charlotte, NC	L 59–65
December 6*	at Furman	Alley Gymnasium • Greenville, SC	L 69–83
December 9*	Presbyterian	Littlejohn Coliseum • Clemson, SC	W 89–68
December 16*	at Villanova	Armory Fieldhouse • Philadelphia, PA	L 60–63
December 22*	Kent State	Littlejohn Coliseum • Clemson, SC	W 70–63
December 28*	vs. Pepperdine	Greenville, SC (Poinsettia Classic Semifinal)	W 80–65
December 29*	vs. Furman	Greenville, SC (Poinsettia Classic Final)	L 59–70
January 3*	Niagara	Littlejohn Coliseum • Clemson, SC	W 75–68
January 6	#2 Maryland	Littlejohn Coliseum • Clemson, SC	L 75–79
January 10	at #7 North Carolina	Carmichael Auditorium • Chapel Hill, NC	L 58–92
January 13	at Duke	Cameron Indoor Stadium • Durham, NC	L 73–75
January 17*	at #17 St. John's	New York, NY	L 59–87
January 20	#2 NC State	Littlejohn Coliseum • Clemson, SC	L 76–86
January 24*	The Citadel	Littlejohn Coliseum • Clemson, SC	W 72–54
January 27	Virginia	Littlejohn Coliseum • Clemson, SC	W 64–63
February 3*	at Georgia Tech	Alexander Memorial Coliseum • Atlanta, GA	W 74–57
February 6*	Stetson	Littlejohn Coliseum • Clemson, SC	W 89–68
February 9	vs. #2 NC State	Charlotte Coliseum • Charlotte, NC (North–South Doubleheader)	L 61–68
February 10	vs. #6 North Carolina	Charlotte Coliseum • Charlotte, NC (North–South Doubleheader)	L 69–84
February 14	Wake Forest	Littlejohn Coliseum • Clemson, SC	W 86–61
February 17	at #10 Maryland	Cole Field House • College Park, MD	L 66–69
February 19	at Virginia	University Hall • Charlottesville, VA	W 56–54 (OT)
February 24	at Wake Forest	Winston–Salem Memorial Coliseum • Winston-Salem, NC	L 55–58
February 28	Duke	Littlejohn Coliseum • Clemson, SC	W 75–50
March 8*	vs. #10 Maryland	Greensboro Coliseum • Greensboro, NC (ACC Tournament Quarterfinal)	L 61–77
*Non-Conference Game. #Rankings from AP Poll released prior to game.

== 1973–74 ==
1973–74 Clemson Tigers men's basketball

IPTAY Tournament Champions Poinsettia Classic Champions
- Conference: Atlantic Coast Conference
- Record: 14–12 (3–9 ACC)
- Head coach: Tates Locke
- Home arena: Littlejohn Coliseum

1973–74 ACC men's basketball standings
	Conf.				Overall
Team	W		L	PCT	W		L	PCT
No. 1 NC State †	12	–	0	1.000	30	–	1	.968
No. 4 Maryland	9	–	3	.750	23	–	5	.821
No. 12 North Carolina	9	–	3	.750	22	–	6	.786
Virginia	4	–	8	.333	11	–	16	.407
Clemson	3	–	9	.250	14	–	12	.538
Wake Forest	3	–	9	.250	13	–	13	.500
Duke	2	–	10	.167	10	–	16	.385
† 1974 ACC tournament winner Rankings from AP Poll

Date	Opponent	Site	Result
November 30*	Auburn	Littlejohn Coliseum • Clemson, SC (IPTAY Tournament Semifinal)	W 87–72
December 1*	St. John's	Littlejohn Coliseum • Clemson, SC (IPTAY Tournament Final)	W 68–58
December 5*	at Purdue	Mackey Arena • West Lafayette, IN	W 81–80 (OT)
December 7*	vs. Florida State	Pittsburgh, PA (Steel Bowl tournament semifinal)	L 58–65
December 8*	vs. Duquesne	Pittsburgh, PA (Steel Bowl tournament consolation)	W 71–66
December 15*	Georgia Tech	Littlejohn Coliseum • Clemson, SC	W 63–61
December 18*	#8 Louisville	Littlejohn Coliseum • Clemson, SC	L 70–74
December 28*	vs. Delaware	Greenville, SC (Poinsettia Classic Semifinal)	W 78–63
December 29*	vs. Furman	Greenville, SC (Poinsettia Classic Final)	W 75–67
January 5	at #3 Maryland	Cole Field House • College Park, MD	L 60–89
January 9	#5 North Carolina	Littlejohn Coliseum • Clemson, SC	L 90–102
January 12	at #4 NC State	Reynolds Coliseum • Raleigh, NC	L 68–96
January 16	at Duke	Cameron Indoor Stadium • Durham, NC	L 50–63
January 19	at Wake Forest	Winston–Salem Memorial Coliseum • Winston-Salem, NC	L 65–74
January 23*	Furman	Littlejohn Coliseum • Clemson, SC	W 58–54
January 26	Virginia	Littlejohn Coliseum • Clemson, SC	W 61–51
January 30*	The Citadel	Littlejohn Coliseum • Clemson, SC	W 62–58 (OT)
February 2	at #4 North Carolina	Carmichael Auditorium • Chapel Hill, NC	L 60–61
February 6*	East Tennessee State	Littlejohn Coliseum • Clemson, SC	W 73–65
February 13	Wake Forest	Littlejohn Coliseum • Clemson, SC	W 74–73
February 16	#6 Maryland	Littlejohn Coliseum • Clemson, SC	L 54–56
February 20	at Virginia	University Hall • Charlottesville, VA	L 68–81
February 23	#1 NC State	Littlejohn Coliseum • Clemson, SC	L 75–80
February 27	Duke	Littlejohn Coliseum • Clemson, SC	W 74–68
March 2*	at Georgia Tech	Alexander Memorial Coliseum • Atlanta, GA	W 71–58
March 7*	vs. Virginia	Greensboro Coliseum • Greensboro, NC (ACC Tournament Quarterfinal)	L 63–68
*Non-Conference Game. #Rankings from AP Poll released prior to game.

== 1974–75 ==
1974–75 Clemson Tigers men's basketball

NIT, First Round
- Conference: Atlantic Coast Conference

Ranking
- Coaches: No. 19
- Record: 17–11 (8–4 ACC)
- Head coach: Tates Locke
- Home arena: Littlejohn Coliseum

1974–75 ACC men's basketball standings
	Conf.				Overall
Team	W		L	PCT	W		L	PCT
No. 5 Maryland	10	–	2	.833	24	–	5	.828
No. 9 North Carolina †	8	–	4	.667	23	–	8	.742
Clemson	8	–	4	.667	17	–	11	.607
No. 7 NC State	8	–	4	.667	22	–	6	.786
Virginia	4	–	8	.333	12	–	13	.480
Duke	2	–	10	.167	13	–	13	.500
Wake Forest	2	–	10	.167	13	–	13	.500
† 1975 ACC tournament winner Rankings from AP Poll

Date	Opponent	Rank^{#}	Site	Result
November 29*	Ole Miss		Littlejohn Coliseum • Clemson, SC (IPTAY Tournament Semifinal)	W 93–80
November 30*	#14 Penn		Littlejohn Coliseum • Clemson, SC (IPTAY Tournament Final)	L 75–76
December 4*	Furman		Littlejohn Coliseum • Clemson, SC	W 82–69
December 7*	Appalachian State		Littlejohn Coliseum • Clemson, SC	W 103–57
December 18*	at #4 Louisville		Freedom Hall • Louisville, KY	L 75–90
December 20*	vs. La Salle		University of Dayton Arena • Dayton, OH (Dayton Invitational Semifinal)	L 63–67
December 21*	vs. Dayton		University of Dayton Arena • Dayton, OH (Dayton Invitational Consolation)	L 69–71
December 27*	vs. Auburn		Metropolitan Sports Center • Bloomington, MN (Pillsbury Classic Semifinal)	W 63–59
December 28*	vs. Minnesota		Metropolitan Sports Center • Bloomington, MN (Pillsbury Classic Final)	L 52–66
December 31*	at Florida Southern		Lakeland, FL	W 92–73
January 4	Virginia		Littlejohn Coliseum • Clemson, SC	W 86–68
January 9	at #15 North Carolina		Carmichael Auditorium • Chapel Hill, NC	L 72–74
January 15	at Duke		Cameron Indoor Stadium • Durham, NC	L 72–75
January 18	Wake Forest		Littlejohn Coliseum • Clemson, SC	W 80–77
January 22	#3 Maryland		Littlejohn Coliseum • Clemson, SC	W 83–82
January 25	at Virginia		University Hall • Charlottesville, VA	W 74–64
January 29*	The Citadel		Littlejohn Coliseum • Clemson, SC	W 106–75
February 1	#10 North Carolina		Littlejohn Coliseum • Clemson, SC	W 80–72
February 4	at #6 NC State	#15	Reynolds Coliseum • Raleigh, NC	L 89–92
February 12	at Wake Forest	#18	Winston–Salem Memorial Coliseum • Winston-Salem, NC	W 71–54
February 15	Duke	#18	Littlejohn Coliseum • Clemson, SC	W 100–66
February 19*	at Georgia Tech	#16	Alexander Memorial Coliseum • Atlanta, GA	W 85–69
February 22	#4 NC State	#16	Littlejohn Coliseum • Clemson, SC	W 92–70
February 26	at #2 Maryland	#11	Cole Field House • College Park, MD	L 64–70
March 1*	Biscayne	#11	Littlejohn Coliseum • Clemson, SC	W 93–59
March 6*	vs. Duke	#14	Greensboro Coliseum • Greensboro, NC (ACC Tournament Quarterfinal)	W 78–76
March 7*	vs. #12 North Carolina	#14	Greensboro Coliseum • Greensboro, NC (ACC Tournament Semifinal)	L 71–76 (OT)
March 15*	vs. Providence	#14	Madison Square Garden • New York, NY (NIT First Round)	L 86–91
*Non-Conference Game. #Rankings from AP Poll released prior to game.

== 1975–76 ==
1975–76 Clemson Tigers men's basketball

Charlotte Invitational Champions
- Conference: Atlantic Coast Conference
- Record: 18–10 (5–7 ACC)
- Head coach: Bill Foster
- Home arena: Littlejohn Coliseum

1975–76 ACC men's basketball standings
	Conf.				Overall
Team	W		L	PCT	W		L	PCT
No. 8 North Carolina	11	–	1	.917	25	–	4	.862
No. 11 Maryland	7	–	5	.583	22	–	6	.786
NC State	7	–	5	.583	21	–	9	.700
Clemson	5	–	7	.417	18	–	10	.643
Wake Forest	5	–	7	.417	17	–	10	.630
No. 18 Virginia †	4	–	8	.333	18	–	12	.600
Duke	3	–	9	.250	13	–	14	.481
† 1976 ACC tournament winner Rankings from AP Poll

=== Roster ===
1975–76 Clemson Tigers men's basketball team
Players	Coaches
Pos. / # / Name / Height / Weight / Year / Hometown; C / 30 / Tree Rollins / 7 ft 1 in (2.16 m) / 230 lb (104 kg) / Jr / Cordele, Georgia	Head coach: Bill Foster; Assistant coach(es) Legend: (C) Team captain; (S) Suspended; (I) Ineligible; (W) Walk-on; Injured; Current redshirt

=== Schedule ===
Date	Opponent	Site	Result
November 28*	Harvard	Littlejohn Coliseum • Clemson, SC (IPTAY Tournament Semifinal)	W 78–64
November 29*	Austin Peay	Littlejohn Coliseum • Clemson, SC (IPTAY Tournament Final)	L 81–87 (OT)
December 3*	at Furman	Alley Gymnasium • Greenville, SC	W 92–86 (OT)
December 6*	Baptist	Littlejohn Coliseum • Clemson, SC	W 93–49
December 13*	Presbyterian	Littlejohn Coliseum • Clemson, SC	W 103–64
December 16*	Jacksonville	Jacksonville Veterans Memorial Coliseum • Jacksonville, FL	W 59–54
December 19*	vs. Middle Tennessee St.	Stokely Athletic Center • Knoxville, TN (Volunteer Classic Semifinal)	W 82–46
December 20*	vs. #11 Tennessee	Stokely Athletic Center • Knoxville, TN (Volunteer Classic Final)	L 66–77
December 29*	vs. Boston College	Charlotte Coliseum • Charlotte, NC (Charlotte Invitational Semifinal)	W 80–60
December 30*	vs. Davidson	Charlotte Coliseum • Charlotte, NC (Charlotte Invitational Final)	W 72–54
January 2*	Biscayne	Littlejohn Coliseum • Clemson, SC	W 103–71
January 7	#6 North Carolina	Littlejohn Coliseum • Clemson, SC	L 64–80
January 10*	at The Citadel	McAlister Field House • Charleston, SC	W 81–68
January 14	Duke	Littlejohn Coliseum • Clemson, SC	W 102–96 (OT)
January 17	at #5 Wake Forest	Winston–Salem Memorial Coliseum • Winston-Salem, NC	W 86–81
January 21	at #2 Maryland	Cole Field House • College Park, MD	W 82–77
January 24	Virginia	Littlejohn Coliseum • Clemson, SC	L 62–69
January 28*	Furman	Littlejohn Coliseum • Clemson, SC	W 89–65
January 31	at #4 North Carolina	Carmichael Auditorium • Chapel Hill, NC	L 64–79
February 3	at #10 NC State	Reynolds Coliseum • Raleigh, NC	L 89–92
February 11	Wake Forest	Littlejohn Coliseum • Clemson, SC	L 77–84
February 14	#4 Maryland	Littlejohn Coliseum • Clemson, SC	L 89–98
February 18	at Virginia	University Hall • Charlottesville, VA	L 77–90
February 21	#12 NC State	Littlejohn Coliseum • Clemson, SC	W 103–90
February 25	at Duke	Cameron Indoor Stadium • Durham, NC	W 90–89
February 28*	Florida Southern	Littlejohn Coliseum • Clemson, SC	W 122–79
March 4*	vs. Wake Forest	Capital Centre • Landover, MD (ACC Tournament Quarterfinal)	W 76–63
March 5*	vs. #4 North Carolina	Capital Centre • Landover, MD (ACC Tournament Semifinal)	L 74–82
*Non-Conference Game. #Rankings from AP Poll released prior to game.

== 1976–77 ==
1976–77 Clemson Tigers men's basketball

IPTAY Tournament Champions
- Conference: Atlantic Coast Conference
- Record: 22–6 (8–4 ACC)
- Head coach: Bill Foster
- Home arena: Littlejohn Coliseum

=== Roster ===
1976–77 Clemson Tigers men's basketball team
Players	Coaches
Pos. / # / Name / Height / Weight / Year / Hometown; C / 30 / Tree Rollins / 7 ft 1 in (2.16 m) / 230 lb (104 kg) / Sr / Cordele, Georgia	Head coach: Bill Foster; Assistant coach(es) Legend: (C) Team captain; (S) Suspended; (I) Ineligible; (W) Walk-on; Injured; Current redshirt

=== Schedule ===
Date	Opponent	Rank^{#}	Site	Result
November 26*	Yale		Littlejohn Coliseum • Clemson, SC (IPTAY Tournament Semifinal)	W 104–50
November 27*	Florida State		Littlejohn Coliseum • Clemson, SC (IPTAY Tournament Final)	W 108–92
December 1*	Furman		Littlejohn Coliseum • Clemson, SC	W 110–72
December 4*	Georgia Southern		Littlejohn Coliseum • Clemson, SC	W 110–55
December 11*	Tennessee Tech	#16	Littlejohn Coliseum • Clemson, SC	W 133–78
December 14*	Buffalo	#13	Littlejohn Coliseum • Clemson, SC	W 98–67
December 16*	Biscayne	#13	Miami, FL	W 94–42
December 18*	at Stetson	#13	Edmunds Center • DeLand, FL	W 78–64
December 27*	vs. #6 Marquette	#11	Milwaukee, WI (Dairyland Classic Semifinal)	L 49–67
December 28*	vs. Boston College	#11	Milwaukee, WI (Dairyland Classic Consolation)	W 128–76
January 5	vs. #6 North Carolina	#16	Greensboro Coliseum • Greensboro, NC	L 63–91
January 8*	Georgia Tech	#16	Littlejohn Coliseum • Clemson, SC	W 98–69
January 12	at Duke	#17	Cameron Indoor Stadium • Durham, NC	W 80–73 (OT)
January 15	#7 Wake Forest	#17	Littlejohn Coliseum • Clemson, SC	L 82–84
January 19	#13 Maryland		Littlejohn Coliseum • Clemson, SC	W 93–71
January 22	at Virginia		University Hall • Charlottesville, VA	W 63–54
January 26*	at Furman	#19	Alley Gymnasium • Greenville, SC	W 94–86
January 29	#4 North Carolina	#19	Littlejohn Coliseum • Clemson, SC	W 93–73
February 1	NC State	#16	Littlejohn Coliseum • Clemson, SC	W 60–59
February 3*	Cleveland State	#16	Littlejohn Coliseum • Clemson, SC	W 77–50
February 8	at #4 Wake Forest	#15	Winston–Salem Memorial Coliseum • Winston-Salem, NC	W 70–66
February 12	at Maryland	#15	Cole Field House • College Park, MD	L 78–84
February 16	Virginia	#18	Littlejohn Coliseum • Clemson, SC	L 65–71
February 19	at NC State	#18	Reynolds Coliseum • Raleigh, NC	W 68–66
February 23	Duke	#18	Littlejohn Coliseum • Clemson, SC	W 67–63
February 26*	Roanoke	#19	Littlejohn Coliseum • Clemson, SC	W 120–56
March 3*	vs. Duke	#18	Greensboro Coliseum • Greensboro, NC (ACC Tournament Quarterfinal)	W 82–74
March 4*	vs. Virginia	#18	Greensboro Coliseum • Greensboro, NC (ACC Tournament Semifinal)	L 60–72
*Non-Conference Game. #Rankings from AP Poll released prior to game.

== 1977–78 ==
1977–78 Clemson Tigers men's basketball

IPTAY Tournament Champions
- Conference: Atlantic Coast Conference
- Record: 15–12 (3–9 ACC)
- Head coach: Bill Foster
- Home arena: Littlejohn Coliseum

1977–78 ACC men's basketball standings
	Conf.				Overall
Team	W		L	PCT	W		L	PCT
No. 16 North Carolina	9	–	3	.750	23	–	8	.742
No. 7 Duke †	8	–	4	.667	27	–	7	.794
NC State	7	–	5	.583	21	–	10	.677
Virginia	6	–	6	.500	20	–	8	.714
Wake Forest	6	–	6	.500	19	–	10	.655
Maryland	3	–	9	.250	15	–	13	.536
Clemson	3	–	9	.250	15	–	12	.556
† 1978 ACC tournament winner Rankings from AP Poll

Date	Opponent	Site	Result
November 25*	TCU	Littlejohn Coliseum • Clemson, SC (IPTAY Tournament Semifinal)	W 125–62
November 26*	Rhode Island	Littlejohn Coliseum • Clemson, SC (IPTAY Tournament Final)	W 82–75
November 30*	at Furman	Alley Gymnasium • Greenville, SC	W 101–83
December 3*	The Citadel	Littlejohn Coliseum • Clemson, SC	W 99–65
December 7*	American	Littlejohn Coliseum • Clemson, SC	W 98–58
December 10*	at South Carolina	Carolina Coliseum • Columbia, SC	L 66–72
December 17*	Appalachian State	Littlejohn Coliseum • Clemson, SC	W 93–88
December 20*	vs. Catholic	Charleston, SC	W 82–58
December 21*	vs. Canisius	Charleston, SC	W 94–61
December 30*	vs. Boston University	Jacksonville, FL	W 100–55
January 4	#2 North Carolina	Littlejohn Coliseum • Clemson, SC	L 77–79 (OT)
January 7*	South Carolina	Littlejohn Coliseum • Clemson, SC	W 79–58
January 11	Duke	Littlejohn Coliseum • Clemson, SC	L 85–107
January 14	at Wake Forest	Greensboro Coliseum • Greensboro, NC	L 90–91 (OT)
January 16	at Maryland	Cole Field House • College Park, MD	L 75–90
January 21	#13 Virginia	Littlejohn Coliseum • Clemson, SC	W 79–70 (OT)
January 25*	Furman	Littlejohn Coliseum • Clemson, SC	L 68–87
January 28	at #3 North Carolina	Carmichael Auditorium • Chapel Hill, NC	L 64–98
January 31	at NC State	Reynolds Coliseum • Raleigh, NC	L 69–73
February 4*	Stetson	Littlejohn Coliseum • Clemson, SC	W 85–65
February 8	#14 Wake Forest	Littlejohn Coliseum • Clemson, SC	W 91–81
February 11	Maryland	Littlejohn Coliseum • Clemson, SC	L 75–80
February 15	at #17 Virginia	University Hall • Charlottesville, VA	W 63–55
February 18	NC State	Littlejohn Coliseum • Clemson, SC	L 65–72
February 22	at #13 Duke	Cameron Indoor Stadium • Durham, NC	L 65–78
February 25*	Biscayne	Littlejohn Coliseum • Clemson, SC	W 91–47
March 1*	vs. #15 Duke	Greensboro Coliseum • Greensboro, NC (ACC Tournament Quarterfinal)	L 72–83
*Non-Conference Game. #Rankings from AP Poll released prior to game.

== 1978–79 ==
1978–79 Clemson Tigers men's basketball

IPTAY Tournament Champions Sun Bowl Carnival Champions

NIT, Second Round
- Conference: Atlantic Coast Conference
- Record: 19–10 (5–7 ACC)
- Head coach: Bill Foster
- Home arena: Littlejohn Coliseum

1978–79 ACC men's basketball standings
	Conf.				Overall
Team	W		L	PCT	W		L	PCT
No. 9 North Carolina †	9	–	3	.750	23	–	6	.793
No. 11 Duke	9	–	3	.750	22	–	8	.733
Virginia	7	–	5	.583	19	–	10	.655
Maryland	6	–	6	.500	19	–	11	.633
Clemson	5	–	7	.417	19	–	10	.655
NC State	3	–	9	.250	18	–	12	.600
Wake Forest	3	–	9	.250	12	–	15	.444
† 1979 ACC tournament winner Rankings from AP Poll

Date	Opponent	Site	Result
November 24*	Catholic	Littlejohn Coliseum • Clemson, SC	W 108–67
November 27*	Furman	Littlejohn Coliseum • Clemson, SC	W 106–74
December 1*	Brown	Littlejohn Coliseum • Clemson, SC (IPTAY Tournament Semifinal)	W 73–57
December 2*	Kent State	Littlejohn Coliseum • Clemson, SC (IPTAY Tournament Final)	W 72–52
December 6*	at South Carolina	Carolina Coliseum • Columbia, SC	W 70–65
December 9*	The Citadel	Littlejohn Coliseum • Clemson, SC	W 71–58
December 16*	Western Carolina	Littlejohn Coliseum • Clemson, SC	W 71–56
December 28*	vs. UTEP	Special Events Center • El Paso, TX (Sun Bowl Carnival Semifinal)	W 68–57
December 29*	vs. Texas Tech	Special Events Center • El Paso, TX (Sun Bowl Carnival Final)	W 58–57
January 3	vs. #3 North Carolina	Greensboro Coliseum • Greensboro, NC	L 68–90
January 6*	at The Citadel	McAlister Field House • Charleston, SC	L 56–58
January 10	at #7 Duke	Cameron Indoor Stadium • Durham, NC	L 54–73
January 13	Wake Forest	Littlejohn Coliseum • Clemson, SC	W 71–66 (2OT)
January 17	#19 Maryland	Littlejohn Coliseum • Clemson, SC	L 63–77
January 20	at Virginia	University Hall • Charlottesville, VA	L 54–61
January 24*	at Furman	Alley Gymnasium • Greenville, SC	W 64–58
January 27	#2 North Carolina	Littlejohn Coliseum • Clemson, SC	W 66–61
January 30	#20 NC State	Littlejohn Coliseum • Clemson, SC	W 85–72
February 1*	Colgate	Littlejohn Coliseum • Clemson, SC	W 110–73
February 3*	South Carolina	Littlejohn Coliseum • Clemson, SC	W 74–64
February 7	at Wake Forest	Greensboro Coliseum • Greensboro, NC	W 85–74
February 10	at #19 Maryland	Cole Field House • College Park, MD	L 69–77
February 14	Virginia	Littlejohn Coliseum • Clemson, SC	L 68–72
February 17	at NC State	Reynolds Coliseum • Raleigh, NC	L 58–83
February 21	#6 Duke	Littlejohn Coliseum • Clemson, SC	W 70–49
February 24*	Buffalo State	Littlejohn Coliseum • Clemson, SC	W 81–47
March 1*	vs. Maryland	Greensboro Coliseum • Greensboro, NC (ACC Tournament Quarterfinal)	L 67–75
March 7*	at Kentucky	Rupp Arena • Lexington, KY (NIT First Round)	W 68–67 (OT)
March 12*	Old Dominion	Littlejohn Coliseum • Clemson, SC (NIT Second Round)	L 59–61 (2OT)
*Non-Conference Game. #Rankings from AP Poll released prior to game.
