= 1974–75 Princeton Tigers men's basketball team =

American college basketball season

1974–75 Princeton Tigers men's basketball

1975 National Invitation Tournament, Champion
- Conference: Ivy League

Ranking
- AP: No. 12
- Record: 22-8 (12-2, 2nd Ivy)
- Head coach: Pete Carril
- Captains: Armond Hill; Michael Steuerer
- Home arena: Jadwin Gymnasium

The 1974–75 Princeton Tigers men's basketball team represented the Princeton University in intercollegiate college basketball during the 1974–75 NCAA Division I men's basketball season. The head coach was Pete Carril and the team co-captains were Armond Hill and Michael Steuerer. The team played its home games in the Jadwin Gymnasium on the University campus in Princeton, New Jersey, and was the runner-up of the Ivy League and champion of the 16-team 1975 National Invitation Tournament.

The team won its last thirteen games and posted a 22-8 overall record and a 12-2 conference record. The team won the National Invitation Tournament held at New York City's Madison Square Garden by defeating the Holy Cross Crusaders 84–63 on March 16, 1975, the South Carolina Gamecocks 86–67 on March 20, the Oregon Ducks 58–57 on March 22 and the Providence Friars 80–69 on March 23. This was the school's first and only post season tournament championship.

During the season, the team spent the final two weeks of the seventeen-week season ranked in the Associated Press Top Ten Poll, peaking at number eight and ending the season ranked number twelve. The team also finished the season ranked number twelve in the final UPI Coaches' Poll.

Armond Hill, who led the Ivy League in free throw percentage with an 81.1% average, was selected to the All-Ivy League first team. Tim van Blommesteyn, who set the Ivy League single-season steals record (72) that Hill would break the following year, was selected in the 1975 NBA draft by the New York Knicks with the 153rd overall selection in the 9th Round. On January 11, 1975, against Harvard, Steurer made all twelve of his free throws to find his way into the Ivy League's record books although short of Bill Bradley's perfect 16 free throw night and the Ivy League record of 21.

== Regular season ==
The team posted a 22-8 (12-2 Ivy League) record.

FORDHAM	W	70-47
NAVY	W	66-55
Notre Dame	L	66-80
Villanova	W	79-70
DAVIDSON	W	72-56
Rutgers	L	67-73
South Carolina !	L	48-66
Duke !	L	57-66
PENNSYLVANIA	W	50-49
Lafayette	L	67-73
DARTMOUTH	W	82-68
HARVARD	W	67-57
Temple	W	59-48
Duke	L	73-90
Pennsylvania	L	57-75
Yale	W	62-50
Brown	L	61-62
CORNELL	W	59-29
COLUMBIA	W	86-67
Harvard	W	70-55
Dartmouth	W	70-58
Columbia	W	78-60
Cornell	W	80-53
Virginia	W	55-50
BROWN	W	61-57
YALE	W	76-68
Holy Cross @	W	84-63
South Carolina @	W	86-67
Oregon @	W	58-57
Providence @	W	80-69

! = South Carolina Classic at Columbia, S.C.
@ = NIT at New York

Home games in CAPS

== Rankings ==
Ranking movement Legend: ██ Increase in ranking. ██ Decrease in ranking.
Poll	Pre	Wk 1	Wk 2	Wk 3	Wk 4	Wk 5	Wk 6	Wk 7	Wk 8	Wk 9	Wk 10	Wk 11	Wk 12	Wk 13	Wk 14	Wk 15	Wk 16	Wk 17	Final
AP Top 20 Poll	-	-	-	-	-	-	-	-	-	-	-	-	-	-	-	-	-	13	12

== NIT tournament ==
The team won the 1975 National Invitation Tournament.

National Invitation Tournament

3/16/75 at Madison Square Garden: Princeton 84, Holy Cross 63
3/20/75 at Madison Square Garden: Princeton 86, So. Carolina 67
3/22/75 at Madison Square Garden: Princeton 58, Oregon 57

NIT CHAMPIONSHIP GAME

3/23/75 at Madison Square Garden: Princeton 80, Providence 69

== Awards and honors ==
- Armond Hill
  - First Team All-Ivy League
  - All-East
- Barnes Hauptfuhrer
  - Second Team All-Ivy League
- Mickey Steuerer
  - Honorable Mention All-Ivy League
- Tim van Blommsteyn
  - Honorable Mention All-Ivy League

== Team players drafted into the NBA ==
Three players from this team were selected in the NBA draft.

Year	Round	Pick	Player	NBA Club
1975	9	9	Tim van Blommsteyn	New York Knicks
1976	1	9	Armond Hill	Atlanta Hawks
1976	3	10	Barnes Hauptfuhrer	Houston Rockets
