= 1974–75 Connecticut Huskies men's basketball team =

American college basketball season

1974–75 Connecticut Huskies men's basketball

NIT, First Round
- Conference: Yankee Conference
- Record: 18–10 (9–3 YC)
- Head coach: Dee Rowe (6th season)
- Assistant coaches: Steven F. Bell; Dom Perno; Dan Switchenko
- Home arena: Hugh S. Greer Field House

1974–75 Yankee Conference men's basketball standings
	Conf.				Overall
Team	W		L	PCT	W		L	PCT
Massachusetts	10	–	2	.833	18	–	8	.692
Connecticut	9	–	3	.750	18	–	10	.643
Vermont	8	–	4	.667	16	–	10	.615
Boston University	7	–	4	.636	12	–	13	.480
Rhode Island	3	–	7	.300	5	–	20	.200
New Hampshire	2	–	10	.167	6	–	18	.250
Maine	1	–	10	.091	11	–	14	.440

The 1974–75 Connecticut Huskies men's basketball team represented the University of Connecticut in the 1974–75 collegiate men's basketball season. The Huskies completed the season with an 18–10 overall record. The Huskies were members of the Yankee Conference, where they ended the season with a 9–3 record. They made it to the first round in the 1975 National Invitation Tournament. The Huskies played their home games at Hugh S. Greer Field House in Storrs, Connecticut, and were led by sixth-year head coach Dee Rowe.

== Schedule ==
Date time, TV	Rank^{#}	Opponent^{#}	Result	Record	Site (attendance) city, state
Regular season
11/30/1974*		at Yale	W 88–73	1–0	Payne Whitney Gymnasium; New Haven, CT
12/3/1974*		Cal State Fullerton	W 78–63	2–0	Hugh S. Greer Field House; Storrs, CT
12/6/1974*		vs. Mississippi State; Show-Me Classic	L 87–89	2–1	Hearnes Center; Columbia, MO
12/7/1974*		vs. Portland; Show-Me Classic	W 69–64	3–1	Hearnes Center; Columbia, MO
12/10/1974		Vermont	W 90–84	4–1 (1–0)	Hugh S. Greer Field House; Storrs, CT
12/14/1974		Rhode Island	W 85–68	5–1 (2–0)	Hugh S. Greer Field House; Storrs, CT
1/4/1975		at New Hampshire	L 56–57	5–2 (2–1)	Lundholm Gym; Durham, NH
1/10/1975*		Eastern Michigan; UConn Classic	W 76–60	6–2	Hugh S. Greer Field House; Storrs, CT
1/11/1975*		East Carolina; UConn Classic	W 79–77	7–2	Hugh S. Greer Field House; Storrs, CT
1/15/1975		New Hampshire	W 73–67	8–2 (3–1)	Hugh S. Greer Field House; Storrs, CT
1/18/1975*		at Colgate	W 80–65	9–2	Cotterell Court; Hamilton, NY
1/22/1975*		Long Island	W 85–83	10–2	Hugh S. Greer Field House; Storrs, CT
1/25/1975		at Vermont	L 69–70	10–3 (3–2)	Patrick Gym; Burlington, VT
1/28/1975*		Fairfield	W 87–78	11–3	Hugh S. Greer Field House; Storrs, CT
2/2/1975		at Maine	W 100–90 ^{OT}	12–3 (4–2)	Memorial Gymnasium; Orono, ME
2/5/1975		Boston University	W 106–85	13–3 (5–2)	Hugh S. Greer Field House; Storrs, CT
2/8/1975		at Massachusetts	W 80–76 ^{OT}	14–3 (6–2)	Curry Hicks Cage; Amherst, MA
2/11/1975*		Rutgers	W 90–89	15–3	Hugh S. Greer Field House; Storrs, CT
2/13/1975*		at Manhattan	L 69–77	15–4	New York, NY
2/15/1975		Massachusetts	L 75–76	15–5 (6–3)	Hugh S. Greer Field House; Storrs, CT
2/19/1975		at Boston University	W 94–79	16–5 (7–3)	Case Gym; Boston, MA
2/22/1975		Maine	W 80–71	17–5 (8–3)	Hugh S. Greer Field House; Storrs, CT
2/25/1975*		at Boston College	L 67–68	17–6	Roberts Center; Boston, MA
3/1/1975		at Rhode Island	W 73–71	18–6 (9–3)	Keaney Gymnasium; Kingston, RI
3/4/1975*		Holy Cross	L 69–81	18–7	Hugh S. Greer Field House; Storrs, CT
ECAC tournament
3/6/1975*		vs. Boston College; Semifinals	L 56–58	18–8	Springfield Civic Center; Springfield, MA
3/8/1975*		vs. Providence; Third Place Game	L 83–108	18–9	Springfield Civic Center; Springfield, MA
NIT
3/16/1975*		vs. South Carolina; First Round	L 61–71	18–10	Madison Square Garden; New York, NY
*Non-conference game. ^{#}Rankings from AP Poll. (#) Tournament seedings in parentheses. All times are in Eastern Time.

Schedule Source:
