= 1974–75 North Carolina Tar Heels men's basketball team =

American college basketball season

1974–75 North Carolina Tar Heels men's basketball

ACC Tournament Champions

NCAA tournament, Sweet Sixteen
- Conference: Atlantic Coast Conference

Ranking
- Coaches: No. 10
- AP: No. 9
- Record: 23–8 (8–4 ACC)
- Head coach: Dean Smith (14th season)
- Assistant coaches: Bill Guthridge (8th season); Eddie Fogler (4th season)
- Captains: Mickey Bell; Brad Hoffman; Ed Stahl
- Home arena: Carmichael Auditorium

1974–75 ACC men's basketball standings
	Conf.				Overall
Team	W		L	PCT	W		L	PCT
No. 5 Maryland	10	–	2	.833	24	–	5	.828
No. 9 North Carolina †	8	–	4	.667	23	–	8	.742
Clemson	8	–	4	.667	17	–	11	.607
No. 7 NC State	8	–	4	.667	22	–	6	.786
Virginia	4	–	8	.333	12	–	13	.480
Duke	2	–	10	.167	13	–	13	.500
Wake Forest	2	–	10	.167	13	–	13	.500
† 1975 ACC tournament winner Rankings from AP Poll

The 1974–75 North Carolina Tar Heels men's basketball team represented the University of North Carolina at Chapel Hill during the 1974–75 men's college basketball season.

== Schedule ==
Date time, TV	Rank^{#}	Opponent^{#}	Result	Record	Site city, state
November 30*	No. 11	St. Thomas (FL)	W 101–74		Carmichael Auditorium; Chapel Hill, NC
December 4*	No. 9	East Tennessee State	W 93–71		Carmichael Auditorium; Chapel Hill, NC
December 7*	No. 9	at No. 20 Houston	W 96–87		Houston, TX
December 9*	No. 9	vs. No. 15 Kentucky	L 78–90		Louisville, KY
December 21*	No. 10	at Yale	W 70–53		New Haven, CT
December 28*	No. 8	vs. Utah	W 94–91		Greensboro, NC
January 3*	No. 8	vs. Duke; Big Four Tournament	L 96–99 ^{OT}		Greensboro, NC
January 4*	No. 8	vs. No. 1 NC State; Big Four Tournament	L 67–82		Greensboro, NC
January 9	No. 15	Clemson	W 74–72		Carmichael Auditorium; Chapel Hill, NC
January 11*	No. 15	Howard	W 109–67		Carmichael Auditorium; Chapel Hill, NC
January 15	No. 15	at Wake Forest	W 80–78		Winston-Salem, NC
January 18	No. 14	at No. 4 NC State	L 85–88 ^{OT}		Raleigh, NC
January 22	No. 14	Virginia	W 85–70		Carmichael Auditorium; Chapel Hill, NC
January 25	No. 14	at No. 2 Maryland	W 69–66		College Park, MD
January 29	No. 10	Wake Forest	W 101–91		Carmichael Auditorium; Chapel Hill, NC
February 1	No. 10	at Clemson	L 72–80		Clemson, SC
February 3*	No. 10	South Florida	W 79–72		Carmichael Auditorium; Chapel Hill, NC
February 7*	No. 12	vs. Furman; North-South Doubleheader	W 86–81		Charlotte, NC
February 8*	No. 12	vs. Georgia Tech; North-South Doubleheader	W 111–81		Charlotte, NC
February 12	No. 11	Duke	W 78–70		Carmichael Auditorium; Chapel Hill, NC
February 15	No. 11	No. 3 Maryland	L 74–96		Carmichael Auditorium; Chapel Hill, NC
February 17*	No. 11	at Virginia Tech	W 87–75		Blacksburg, VA
February 22	No. 13	at Virginia	L 62–65		Charlottesville, VA
February 25	No. 13	No. 7 NC State	W 76–74		Carmichael Auditorium; Chapel Hill, NC
March 1	No. 14	at No. Duke	W 74–70		Cameron Indoor Stadium; Durham, NC
March 6*	No. 12	vs. Wake Forest; ACC tournament	W 101–100 ^{OT}		Greensboro, NC
March 7*	No. 12	vs. No. 14 Clemson; ACC Tournament	W 76–71 ^{OT}		Greensboro, NC
March 8*	No. 12	vs. No. 8 NC State; ACC Tournament	W 70–66		Greensboro, NC
March 15*	No. 7	vs. New Mexico State; NCAA tournament	W 93–69		Charlotte, NC
March 20*	No. 6	vs. No. 20 Syracuse; NCAA Tournament	L 76–78		Providence, RI
March 22*	No. 6	vs. Boston College	W 110–90		Providence, RI
*Non-conference game. ^{#}Rankings from AP Poll. (#) Tournament seedings in parentheses. E=East.
