= List of Iowa State Cyclones men's basketball seasons =

This is a list of seasons completed by the Iowa State Cyclones men's basketball team of the National Collegiate Athletic Association (NCAA) Division I. The Iowa State fielded their first team in 1908 with S. Clyde Williams coaching.

== Seasons ==
Record table
Season	Coach	Overall	Conference	Standing	Postseason
Clyde Williams (Missouri Valley Intercollegiate Athletic Association) (1907–1911)
1907–08	Clyde Williams	1–1	1–0	2nd (North)	
1908–09	Clyde Williams	4–10	4–4	2nd (North)	
1909–10	Clyde Williams	9–7	6–2	T–1st (North)	
1910–11	Clyde Williams	6–11	6–8	3rd	
Homer C. Hubbard (Missouri Valley Intercollegiate Athletic Association) (1911–1915)
1911–12	Homer C. Hubbard	8–7	4–4	2nd (North)	
1912–13	Homer C. Hubbard	3–13	3–9	2nd (North)	
1913–14	Homer C. Hubbard	4–14	4–10	2nd (North)	
1914–15	Homer C. Hubbard	6–7	5–5	T–3rd	
H. H. Walters (Missouri Valley Intercollegiate Athletic Association) (1915–1919)
1915–16	H. H. Walters	4–12	2–8	5th	
1916–17	H. H. Walters	12–6	6–4	3rd	
1917–18	H. H. Walters	6–9	1–6	6th	
1918–19	H. H. Walters	5–11	3–8	6th	
Punk Berryman (Missouri Valley Intercollegiate Athletic Association) (1919–1920)
1919–20	Punk Berryman	6–12	2–10	7th	
Maury Kent (Missouri Valley Intercollegiate Athletic Association) (1920–1921)
1920–21	Maury Kent	10–8	6–8	5th	
Bill Chandler (Missouri Valley Conference) (1921–1928)
1921–22	Bill Chandler	10–8	8–8	T–4th	
1922–23	Bill Chandler	10–8	9–7	4th	
1923–24	Bill Chandler	2–16	2–14	9th	
1924–25	Bill Chandler	2–15	1–15	9th	
1925–26	Bill Chandler	4–14	3–11	9th	
1926–27	Bill Chandler	9–9	7–8	8th	
1927–28	Bill Chandler	3–15	3–15	10th	
Louis Menze (Big Six Conference) (1928–1947)
1928–29	Louis Menze	8–7	4–6	4th	
1929–30	Louis Menze	9–8	5–5	4th	
1930–31	Louis Menze	8–8	4–6	5th	
1931–32	Louis Menze	9–6	4–6	5th	
1932–33	Louis Menze	6–10	2–8	6th	
1933–34	Louis Menze	6–11	2–8	T–5th	
1934–35	Louis Menze	13–3	8–2	1st	
1935–36	Louis Menze	8–8	3–7	T–4th	
1936–37	Louis Menze	3–15	0–10	6th	
1937–38	Louis Menze	6–9	2–8	6th	
1938–39	Louis Menze	8–9	5–5	4th	
1939–40	Louis Menze	9–9	2–8	T–4th	
1940–41	Louis Menze	15–4	7–3	T–1st	
1941–42	Louis Menze	11–6	5–5	3rd	
1942–43	Louis Menze	7–9	2–8	5th	
1943–44	Louis Menze	14–4	9–1	T–1st	NCAA final Four
1944–45	Louis Menze	11–5	8–2	1st	
1945–46	Louis Menze	8–8	5–5	3rd	
1946–47	Louis Menze	7–14	5–5	T–3rd	
Clay Sutherland (Big Seven Conference) (1947–1954)
1947–48	Clay Sutherland	15–8	6–6	4th	
1948–49	Clay Sutherland	7–14	3–9	T–6th	
1949–50	Clay Sutherland	6–17	2–10	7th	
1950–51	Clay Sutherland	9–12	3–9	6th	
1951–52	Clay Sutherland	10–11	4–8	T–4th	
1952–53	Clay Sutherland	10–11	5–7	T–4th	
1953–54	Clay Sutherland	6–15	2–10	7th	
Bill Strannigan (Big Eight Conference) (1954–1959)
1954–55	Bill Strannigan	11–10	4–8	6th	
1955–56	Bill Strannigan	18–5	8–4	T–2nd	
1956–57	Bill Strannigan	16–7	6–6	3rd	
1957–58	Bill Strannigan	15–8	8–4	T–2nd	
1958–59	Bill Strannigan	9–16	4–10	7th	
Glen Anderson (Big Eight Conference) (1959–1971)
1959–60	Glen Anderson	15–9	7–7	T–4th	
1960–61	Glen Anderson	14–11	6–8	5th	
1961–62	Glen Anderson	13–12	8–6	3rd	
1962–63	Glen Anderson	14–11	8–6	T–3rd	
1963–64	Glen Anderson	9–16	5–9	T–6th	
1964–65	Glen Anderson	9–16	6–8	5th	
1965–66	Glen Anderson	11–14	6–8	T–5th	
1966–67	Glen Anderson	13–12	6–8	5th	
1967–68	Glen Anderson	12–13	8–6	T–3rd	
1968–69	Glen Anderson	14–12	8–6	4th	
1969–70	Glen Anderson	12–14	5–9	T–7th	
1970–71	Glen Anderson	5–21	2–12	T–7th	
Maury John (Big Eight Conference) (1971–1974)
1971–72	Maury John	12–14	5–9	6th	
1972–73	Maury John	16–10	7–7	5th	
1973–74	Maury John; Gus Gydon	15–11^{[Note A]}	6–8	5th	
Ken Trickey (Big Eight Conference) (1974–1976)
1974–75	Ken Trickey	10–16	4–10	T–7th	
1975–76	Ken Trickey	3–24	3–11	8th	
Lynn Nance (Big Eight Conference) (1976–1980)
1976–77	Lynn Nance	7–20^{[Note B]}	3–11^{[Note B]}	8th	
1977–78	Lynn Nance	14–13	9–5	2nd	
1978–79	Lynn Nance	11–16	6–8	6th	
1979–80	Lynn Nance; Rick Samuels	11–16^{[Note C]}	5–9^{[Note C]}	7th	
Johnny Orr (Big Eight Conference) (1980–1994)
1980–81	Johnny Orr	9–18	2–12	8th	
1981–82	Johnny Orr	10–17	5–9	6th	
1982–83	Johnny Orr	13–15	5–9	5th	
1983–84	Johnny Orr	16–13	6–8	T–4th	NIT first round
1984–85	Johnny Orr	21–13	7–7	T–3rd	NCAA Division I first round
1985–86	Johnny Orr	22–11	9–5	2nd	NCAA Division I Sweet Sixteen
1986–87	Johnny Orr	13–15	5–9	6th	
1987–88	Johnny Orr	20–12	6–8	5th	NCAA Division I first round
1988–89	Johnny Orr	17–12	7–7	T–4th	NCAA Division I first round
1989–90	Johnny Orr	10–18	4–10	6th	
1990–91	Johnny Orr	12–19	6–8	5th	
1991–92	Johnny Orr	21–13	5–9	T–6th	NCAA Division I second round
1992–93	Johnny Orr	20–11	8–6	T–2nd	NCAA Division I first round
1993–94	Johnny Orr	14–13	4–10	T–6th	
Tim Floyd (Big Eight Conference) (1994–1996)
1994–95	Tim Floyd	23–11	6–8	5th	NCAA Division I second round
1995–96	Tim Floyd	24–9	9–5	2nd	NCAA Division I second round
Tim Floyd (Big 12 Conference) (1996–1998)
1996–97	Tim Floyd	22–9	10–6	3rd	NCAA Division I Sweet Sixteen
1997–98	Tim Floyd	12–18	5–11	11th	
Larry Eustachy (Big 12 Conference) (1998–2003)
1998–99	Larry Eustachy	15–15	6–10	9th	
1999–00	Larry Eustachy	32–5	14–2	1st	NCAA Division I Elite Eight
2000–01	Larry Eustachy	25–6	13–3	1st	NCAA Division I first round
2001–02	Larry Eustachy	12–19	4–12	T–10th	
2002–03	Larry Eustachy	17–14	5–11	T–9th	NIT second round
Wayne Morgan (Big 12 Conference) (2003–2006)
2003–04	Wayne Morgan	20–13	7–9	8th	NIT Semifinal
2004–05	Wayne Morgan	19–12	9–7	T–5th	NCAA Division I second round
2005–06	Wayne Morgan	16–14	6–10	T–7th	
Greg McDermott (Big 12 Conference) (2006–2010)
2006–07	Greg McDermott	15–16	6–10	T–7th	
2007–08	Greg McDermott	14–18	4–12	11th	
2008–09	Greg McDermott	15–17	4–12	10th	
2009–10	Greg McDermott	15–17	4–12	11th	
Fred Hoiberg (Big 12 Conference) (2010–2015)
2010–11	Fred Hoiberg	16–16	3–13	12th	
2011–12	Fred Hoiberg	23–11	12–6	T–3rd	NCAA Division I second round
2012–13	Fred Hoiberg	23–12	11–7	T–4th	NCAA Division I second round
2013–14	Fred Hoiberg	28–8	11–7	T–3rd	NCAA Division I Sweet Sixteen
2014–15	Fred Hoiberg	25–9	12–6	T–2nd	NCAA Division I first round
Steve Prohm (Big 12 Conference) (2015–2021)
2015–16	Steve Prohm	23–12	10–8	T–5th	NCAA Division I Sweet Sixteen
2016–17	Steve Prohm	24–11	12–6	T–2nd	NCAA Division I second round
2017–18	Steve Prohm	13–18	4–14	10th	
2018–19	Steve Prohm	23–12	9–9	5th	NCAA Division I first round
2019–20	Steve Prohm	12–20	5–13	9th	No postseason held
2020–21	Steve Prohm	2–22	0–18	10th	
T. J. Otzelberger (Big 12 Conference) (2021–present)
2021–22	T. J. Otzelberger	22–13	7–11	T–7th	NCAA Division I Sweet Sixteen
2022–23	T. J. Otzelberger	19–14	9–9	T–5th	NCAA Division I first round
2023–24	T. J. Otzelberger	29–8	13–5	2nd	NCAA Division I Sweet Sixteen
2024–25	T. J. Otzelberger	25–10	13–7	5th	NCAA Division I second round
2025–26	T. J. Otzelberger	29–8	12–6	T–3rd	NCAA Division I Sweet Sixteen
Total:		1,514–1,417			
National champion Postseason invitational champion Conference regular season champion Conference regular season and conference tournament champion Division regular season champion Division regular season and conference tournament champion Conference tournament champion

^A. Maury John coached the first five games of the season, going 4–1. Gus Guydon coached the remainder, going 11–10.
^B. ISU finished the season 7–20, but was later awarded a win vacated by Oklahoma State.
^C. Lynn Nance coached the first 18 games of the season, going 8–10 and 2–3 in conference. Rick Samuels coached the remainder, going 3–6 and 3–6 in conference.
