= 1974–75 Michigan Wolverines men's basketball team =

American college basketball season

1974–75 Michigan Wolverines men's basketball

NCAA tournament, First Round
- Conference: Big Ten Conference

Ranking
- AP: No. 19
- Record: 19–8 (12–6 Big Ten)
- Head coach: Johnny Orr
- Assistant coaches: Jim Dutcher; Bill Frieder; Richard Carter
- MVPs: Joe Johnson; C. J. Kupec
- Captains: Joe Johnson; C. J. Kupec
- Home arena: Crisler Arena

1974–75 Big Ten Conference men's basketball standings
	Conf.				Overall
Team	W		L	PCT	W		L	PCT
No. 3 Indiana	18	–	0	1.000	31	–	1	.969
No. 19 Michigan	12	–	6	.667	19	–	8	.704
Minnesota	11	–	7	.611	18	–	8	.692
Purdue	11	–	7	.611	17	–	11	.607
Michigan State	10	–	8	.556	17	–	9	.654
Ohio State	8	–	10	.444	14	–	14	.500
Iowa	7	–	11	.389	10	–	16	.385
Wisconsin	5	–	13	.278	8	–	18	.308
Illinois	4	–	14	.222	8	–	18	.308
Northwestern	4	–	14	.222	6	–	20	.231
Rankings from AP Poll

The 1974–75 Michigan Wolverines men's basketball team represented the University of Michigan in intercollegiate college basketball during the 1974–75 season. The team played its home games in the Crisler Arena in Ann Arbor, Michigan, and was a member of the Big Ten Conference. Under the direction of head coach Johnny Orr, the team finished second in the Big Ten Conference. The team earned the second of four consecutive NCAA Division I men's basketball tournament invitations. Joe Johnson and C. J. Kupec served as team captains and shared team MVP honors. John Robinson led the Big Ten in field goal percentage with a 60.3% average in conference games, while Kupec led the conference in free throw percentage with an 88.0%. As a team, they led the conference in free throw percentage as well with a 75.8%. The team began the season ranked seventeenth, peaked at eleventh, and finished the season in nineteenth in the Associated Press Top Twenty Poll. It was ranked for a total of eight of nineteen weeks during the season. The team ended the season unranked in the final UPI Coaches' Poll. Kupec was selected as an All-American. The team's 74.4% free throw percentage was a school record that lasted 11 seasons. On January 2, 1975, Kupec went 14 for 14 in free throw attempts against Illinois which continues to be a school single-game record for most without a miss, surpassing Craig Dill's total of 12. The team set a school single-season free throw percentage record of 74.4% that would last until 1986.

In the 32-team 1975 NCAA Division I men's basketball tournament, Michigan was eliminated from the West Region in the first round by the UCLA Bruins 103–91.

== Roster ==
1974–75 Michigan Wolverines men's basketball team
Players
Coaches

Pos.	#	Name	Height	Weight	Year	Hometown
F	32	Wayman Britt	6 ft 2 in (1.88 m)	185 lb (84 kg)	Jr	Flint, Michigan
C	41	C. J. Kupec	6 ft 8 in (2.03 m)	230 lb (104 kg)	Sr	Oak Lawn, Illinois

Head coach

- Johnny Orr

Assistant coach(es)

Legend

- (C) Team captain
- (S) Suspended
- (I) Ineligible
- (W) Walk-on
- Injured
- Current redshirt

== Rankings ==
Ranking movements Legend: ██ Increase in ranking ██ Decrease in ranking
	Week																		
Poll	Pre	1	2	3	4	5	6	7	8	9	10	11	12	13	14	15	16	17	Final
AP Poll	17	19	16			17	11	19										19	19

== Team players drafted into the NBA ==
Six players from this team were selected in the NBA draft.

Year	Round	Pick	Overall	Player	NBA Club
1975	4	2	56	C. J. Kupec	Los Angeles Lakers
1976	4	9	60	Wayman Britt	Los Angeles Lakers
1977	3	11	55	Steve Grote	Cleveland Cavaliers
1977	5	22	110	John Robinson	Los Angeles Lakers
1978	3	17	61	Dave Baxter	Seattle SuperSonics
1978	4	3	69	Joel Thompson	Houston Rockets

== See also ==
- NCAA Men's Division I Tournament bids by school
- NCAA Division I men's basketball tournament all-time team records
