= 1974–75 Wisconsin Badgers men's basketball team =

American college basketball season

1974–75 Wisconsin Badgers men's basketball
- Conference: Big Ten Conference
- Record: 8–18 (5–13 Big Ten)
- Head coach: John Powless
- Home arena: UW Fieldhouse

1974–75 Big Ten Conference men's basketball standings
	Conf.				Overall
Team	W		L	PCT	W		L	PCT
No. 3 Indiana	18	–	0	1.000	31	–	1	.969
No. 19 Michigan	12	–	6	.667	19	–	8	.704
Minnesota	11	–	7	.611	18	–	8	.692
Purdue	11	–	7	.611	17	–	11	.607
Michigan State	10	–	8	.556	17	–	9	.654
Ohio State	8	–	10	.444	14	–	14	.500
Iowa	7	–	11	.389	10	–	16	.385
Wisconsin	5	–	13	.278	8	–	18	.308
Illinois	4	–	14	.222	8	–	18	.308
Northwestern	4	–	14	.222	6	–	20	.231
Rankings from AP Poll

The 1974–75 Wisconsin Badgers men's basketball team represented University of Wisconsin–Madison. The head coach was John Powless, coaching his seventh season with the Badgers. The team played their home games at the UW Fieldhouse in Madison, Wisconsin and was a member of the Big Ten Conference.

== Roster ==
1974–75 Wisconsin Badgers men's basketball team
Players	Coaches
Pos. / # / Name / Height / Weight / Year / Hometown	Head coach: John Powless; Assistant coach(es) Legend: (C) Team captain; (S) Suspended; (I) Ineligible; (W) Walk-on; Injured; Current redshirt

== Schedule ==
Date time, TV	Rank^{#}	Opponent^{#}	Result	Record	Site city, state
Regular Season
11/30/1974*		Ohio	W 71–62	1–0	UW Fieldhouse; Madison, WI
12/04/1974*		Saint Mary's (CA)	L 60–62	1–1	UW Fieldhouse; Madison, WI
12/07/1974*		Iowa State	W 86–84	2–1	UW Fieldhouse; Madison, WI
12/18/1974*		Stanford	L 67–89	2–2	UW Fieldhouse; Madison, WI
12/21/1974*		Brown	W 79–68	3–2	UW Fieldhouse; Madison, WI
12/27/1974*		vs. Virginia; Milwaukee Classic	L 78–86	3–3	Milwaukee Arena; Milwaukee, WI
12/28/1974*		vs. Georgia; Milwaukee Classic	L 89–91 ^{OT}	3–4	Milwaukee Arena; Milwaukee, WI
1/05/1975		Minnesota	L 46–61	3–5 (0–1)	UW Fieldhouse; Madison, WI
1/04/1975		at Northwestern	L 66–69	3–6 (0–2)	McGaw Memorial Hall; Evanston, IL
1/11/1975		at Purdue	L 49–88	3–7 (0–3)	Mackey Arena; West Lafayette, IN
1/13/1975		at Illinois	L 56–76	3–8 (0–4)	Assembly Hall; Champaign, IL
1/18/1975		Ohio State	L 67–69	3–9 (0–5)	UW Fieldhouse; Madison, WI
1/20/1975		No. 1 Indiana	L 69–89	3–10 (0–6)	UW Fieldhouse; Madison, WI
1/25/1975		at Michigan State	L 87–105	3–11 (0–7)	Jenison Fieldhouse; East Lansing, MI
1/27/1975		at Michigan	L 73–75 ^{OT}	3–12 (0–8)	Crisler Arena; Ann Arbor, MI
2/01/1975		Iowa	W 86–85 ^{OT}	4–12 (1–8)	UW Fieldhouse; Madison, WI
2/04/1975*		No. 11 Marquette	L 63–69	4–13	UW Fieldhouse; Madison, WI
2/08/1975		Purdue	L 64–69	4–14 (1–9)	UW Fieldhouse; Madison, WI
2/10/1975		Illinois	W 76–70	5–14 (2–9)	UW Fieldhouse; Madison, WI
2/15/1975		at Ohio State	L 70–76	5–15 (2–10)	St. John Arena; Columbus, OH
2/17/1975		at No. 1 Indiana	L 58–93	5–16 (2–11)	Assembly Hall; Bloomington, IN
2/22/1975		Michigan State	W 103–63	6–16 (3–11)	UW Fieldhouse; Madison, WI
2/24/1975		Michigan	W 70–68	7–16 (4–11)	UW Fieldhouse; Madison, WI
3/01/1975		at Iowa	L 68–75	7–17 (4–12)	Iowa Field House; Iowa City, IA
3/03/1975		at Minnesota	L 58–65	7–18 (4–13)	Williams Arena; Minneapolis, MN
3/08/1975		Northwestern	W 94–70	8–18 (5–13)	UW Fieldhouse; Madison, WI
*Non-conference game. ^{#}Rankings from AP Poll. (#) Tournament seedings in parentheses.
