= 1974–75 Illinois Fighting Illini men's basketball team =

American college basketball season

1974–75 Illinois Fighting Illini men's basketball
- Conference: Big Ten Conference
- Record: 8–18 (4–14 Big Ten)
- Head coach: Gene Bartow (1st season)
- Assistant coaches: Tony Yates (1st season); LeRoy Hunt (1st season)
- MVP: Rick Schmidt
- Captain: Rick Schmidt
- Home arena: Assembly Hall

1974–75 Big Ten Conference men's basketball standings
	Conf.				Overall
Team	W		L	PCT	W		L	PCT
No. 3 Indiana	18	–	0	1.000	31	–	1	.969
No. 19 Michigan	12	–	6	.667	19	–	8	.704
Minnesota	11	–	7	.611	18	–	8	.692
Purdue	11	–	7	.611	17	–	11	.607
Michigan State	10	–	8	.556	17	–	9	.654
Ohio State	8	–	10	.444	14	–	14	.500
Iowa	7	–	11	.389	10	–	16	.385
Wisconsin	5	–	13	.278	8	–	18	.308
Illinois	4	–	14	.222	8	–	18	.308
Northwestern	4	–	14	.222	6	–	20	.231
Rankings from AP Poll

The 1974–75 Illinois Fighting Illini men's basketball team represented the University of Illinois.

== Regular season ==
Illinois finished ninth in the Big Ten going went 8-18 overall. Gene Bartow took over the team as head coach. Brought to Illinois to continue the magical rebuilding jobs he had undertaken at Valparaiso and Memphis State, Gene Bartow was counted on by Athletic Director Cecil Coleman to restore the successful level of play fans had become accustomed to in the past few decades. However, Bartow’s stay in Champaign was short-lived, lasting only one year. The lure away from Illinois was a strong one for Bartow; he was hired away by UCLA to replace legendary Bruin coach John Wooden.

=== Roster ===
1974–75 Illinois Fighting Illini men's basketball team
Players
Coaches

Pos.	#	Name	Height	Weight	Year	Previous school	Hometown
G	10	Nate Williams	6 ft 4 in (1.93 m)	185 lb (84 kg)	Jr	Crane High School	Chicago, Illinois
G	11	Dave Roberts	6 ft 2 in (1.88 m)	180 lb (82 kg)	Sr	Proviso East High School	Maywood, Illinois
F/C	15	Tom Carmichael	6 ft 7 in (2.01 m)	215 lb (98 kg)	Sr	Rochelle Township High School	Rochelle, Illinois
G	20	Dennis Graff	6 ft 1 in (1.85 m)	170 lb (77 kg)	Jr	Gibson City High School	Gibson City, Illinois
G	22	Howie Johnson	6 ft 2 in (1.88 m)	165 lb (75 kg)	So	Marshall High School	Marshall, Illinois
F	24	Tom Gerhardt	6 ft 5 in (1.96 m)	210 lb (95 kg)	Fr	De La Salle High School	Chicago, Illinois
F	32	Rick Schmidt (C)	6 ft 6 in (1.98 m)	205 lb (93 kg)	Sr	St. Joseph-Ogden High School	Royal, Illinois
G	33	Otho Tucker (injured) (redshirt)	6 ft 6 in (1.98 m)	200 lb (91 kg)	RS Jr	Paris High School	Paris, Illinois
G/F	34	Rick Leighty	6 ft 3 in (1.91 m)	180 lb (82 kg)	Fr	Lawrenceville High School	Lawrenceville, Illinois
F	40	Rich Adams	6 ft 8 in (2.03 m)	200 lb (91 kg)	Fr	Colerain High School	Cincinnati, Ohio
F/C	41	Dave Smith	6 ft 7 in (2.01 m)	200 lb (91 kg)	Jr	Hinsdale Central High School	Clarendon Hills, Illinois
G/F	42	Tim Bushell	6 ft 6 in (1.98 m)	185 lb (84 kg)	So	Lincoln Community High School	Lincoln, Illinois
F	43	Brad Farnham	6 ft 6 in (1.98 m)	205 lb (93 kg)	So	Paris High School	Paris, Illinois
G/F	44	Audie Matthews	6 ft 5 in (1.96 m)	180 lb (82 kg)	Fr	Bloom High School	Chicago Heights, Illinois
C	53	Bill Rucks	7 ft 0 in (2.13 m)	250 lb (113 kg)	Jr	Waukegan High School	Waukegan, Illinois
C	54	Mike Washington	6 ft 8 in (2.03 m)	195 lb (88 kg)	Jr	Morgan Park High School	Chicago, Illinois

Head coach

- Gene Bartow (Northeast Missouri State University) (1st year)

Assistant coach(es)

- Tony Yates (University of Cincinnati) (1st year)
- LeRoy Hunt (University of Central Missouri) (1st year)

Legend

- (C) Team captain
- (S) Suspended
- (I) Ineligible
- (W) Walk-on
- Injured
- Current redshirt

Roster

== Schedule ==
Date time, TV	Rank^{#}	Opponent^{#}	Result	Record	Site (attendance) city, state
Non-Conference regular season
12/3/1974*		Valparaiso	W 69-58	1 - 0	Assembly Hall (5,990); Champaign, IL
12/7/1974*		DePauw	W 96-53	2 - 0	Assembly Hall (6,912); Champaign, IL
12/9/1974*		at Iowa State	W 77-71	3 - 0	Hilton Coliseum (7,500); Ames, IA
12/13/1974*		No. 17 Arizona; Fiesta Bowl Classic	L 66-78	3 - 1	McKale Center (11,574); Tucson, AZ
12/14/1974*		Arizona State; Fiesta Bowl Classic	L 69-91	3 - 2	Wells Fargo Arena (8,136); Tempe, AZ
12/27/1974*		Stanford; Lobo Invitational Tournament	L 76-89	3 - 3	The Pit (14,163); Albuquerque, NM
12/28/1974*		Army; Lobo Invitational Tournament	W 79-70	4 - 3	The Pit (14,831); Albuquerque, NM
Big Ten regular season
1/2/1975		No. 17 Michigan	L 84-86 ^{2OT}	4 - 4 (0 - 1)	Assembly Hall (6,608); Champaign, IL
1/4/1975		at Iowa; Rivalry	L 70-95	4 - 5 (0 - 2)	Iowa Field House (9,800); Iowa City, IA
1/6/1975		at Minnesota	L 47-75	4 - 6 (0 - 3)	Williams Arena (17,573); Minneapolis, MN
1/11/1975		Northwestern; Rivalry	W 64-60	5 - 6 (1 - 3 ))	Assembly Hall (6,009); Champaign, IL
1/13/1975		Wisconsin	W 72-56	6 - 6 (2 - 3)	Assembly Hall (6,117); Champaign, IL
1/18/1975		Purdue	L 67-86	6 - 7 (2 - 4)	Assembly Hall (9,493); Champaign, IL
1/23/1975*		Tulane	L 69-81	6 - 8	Assembly Hall (7,107); Champaign, IL
1/25/1975		at Ohio State	W 66-62	7 - 8 (3 - 4)	St. John Arena (8,778); Columbus, OH
1/27/1975		at No. 1 Indiana; Rivalry	L 57-73	7 - 9 (3 - 5)	Assembly Hall (17,581); Bloomington, IN
2/1/1975		Michigan State	L 60-75	7 - 10 (3 - 6)	Assembly Hall (8,327); Champaign, IL
2/3/1975		Minnesota	L 50-56	7 - 11 (3 - 7)	Assembly Hall (7,720); Champaign, IL
2/8/1975		at Northwestern; Rivalry	L 47-51	7 - 12 (3 - 8)	McGaw Memorial Hall (4,007); Evanston, IL
2/10/1975		at Wisconsin	L 70-76	7 - 13 (3 - 9)	Wisconsin Field House (4,492); Madison, WI
2/15/1975		at Purdue	L 91-114	7 - 14 (3 - 10)	Mackey Arena (13,936); West Lafayette, IN
2/22/1975		Ohio State	W 83-78 ^{OT}	8 - 14 (4 - 10)	Assembly Hall (9,192); Champaign, IL
2/24/1975		No. 1 Indiana; Rivalry	L 89-112	8 - 15 (4 - 11)	Assembly Hall (14,127); Champaign, IL
3/1/1975		at Michigan State	L 82-96	8 - 16 (4 - 12)	Jenison Fieldhouse (4,851); East Lansing, MI
3/3/1975		at Michigan	L 75-77	8 - 17 (4 - 13)	Crisler Center (6,309); Ann Arbor, MI
3/8/1975		Iowa; Rivalry	L 70-73	8 - 18 (4 - 14)	Assembly Hall (9,171); Champaign, IL
*Non-conference game. ^{#}Rankings from AP Poll. (#) Tournament seedings in parentheses. All times are in Central Time.

== Player stats ==
Player	Games played	Field goals	Free throws	Rebounds	Assists	Points
Rick Schmidt	26	190	144	139	73	524
Otho Tucker	24	114	54	78	72	282
Nate Williams	24	107	42	55	71	256
Mike Washington	26	84	38	126	27	206
Rich Adams	26	50	33	107	19	133
Tom Carmichael	26	54	23	127	31	131
Audi Matthews	26	41	18	87	19	100
Brad Farnham	21	19	22	52	13	60
Howie Johnson	20	25	5	19	39	55
Dave Roberts	11	20	11	17	12	41
Bill Rucks	16	10	8	19	2	28
Tim Bushell	11	20	11	17	12	51
Tom Gerhardt	5	2	0	4	1	4
Rick Leighty	9	1	2	10	8	4
Dave Smith	4	0	0	6	1	0

== Awards and honors ==
- Rick Schmidt
  - Converse Honorable Mention All-American
  - Team Most Valuable Player

== Team players drafted into the NBA ==
Player	NBA club	Round	Pick
Rick Schmidt	New Orleans Jazz	6	91
