= 1974–75 Indiana Hoosiers men's basketball team =

American college basketball season

1974–75 Indiana Hoosiers men's basketball

Coaches Poll regular season champions Big Ten champions

NCAA Tournament, Elite Eight
- Conference: Big Ten Conference

Ranking
- Coaches: No. 1
- AP: No. 3
- Record: 31–1 (18–0 Big Ten)
- Head coach: Bobby Knight (4th season)
- Assistant coaches: Dave Bliss (4th season); Bob Donewald (1st season); Bob Weltlich (4th season); Mike Krzyzewski (1st season)
- Captains: Steve Green; Quinn Buckner
- Home arena: Assembly Hall

1974–75 Big Ten Conference men's basketball standings
| | Conf. | | | | Overall |
| Team | W | | L | PCT | W | | L | PCT |
|---|---|---|---|---|---|---|---|---|
| No. 3 Indiana | 18 | – | 0 | 1.000 | 31 | – | 1 | .969 |
| No. 19 Michigan | 12 | – | 6 | .667 | 19 | – | 8 | .704 |
| Minnesota | 11 | – | 7 | .611 | 18 | – | 8 | .692 |
| Purdue | 11 | – | 7 | .611 | 17 | – | 11 | .607 |
| Michigan State | 10 | – | 8 | .556 | 17 | – | 9 | .654 |
| Ohio State | 8 | – | 10 | .444 | 14 | – | 14 | .500 |
| Iowa | 7 | – | 11 | .389 | 10 | – | 16 | .385 |
| Wisconsin | 5 | – | 13 | .278 | 8 | – | 18 | .308 |
| Illinois | 4 | – | 14 | .222 | 8 | – | 18 | .308 |
| Northwestern | 4 | – | 14 | .222 | 6 | – | 20 | .231 |
Rankings from AP Poll

The 1974–75 Indiana Hoosiers men's basketball team represented Indiana University, led by fourth-year head coach Bobby Knight. The team played its home games on campus in Bloomington at Assembly Hall, and was a member of the Big Ten Conference.

The Hoosiers finished the regular season with a 29–0 record, and won the Big Ten Conference by six games at 18–0. They began the season third in the polls and were top-ranked since January 7. When combined with the following year, Indiana won 37 consecutive Big Ten games. The Hoosiers won their conference games by an average of 22.8 points. However, in an 83–82 win against Purdue on February 22, they lost consensus All-American forward Scott May to a broken left arm. The Hoosiers were so dominant that four starters – Scott May, Steve Green, Kent Benson, and Quinn Buckner – were named to the five-man All-Big Ten team following the regular season. With May's injury keeping him to seven minutes of play, the No. 1 Hoosiers lost to Kentucky 92–90 in the Elite Eight of the NCAA Tournament and finished the season at 31–1. Larry Bird arrived in Bloomington in the summer of 1974, but returned home just 24 days later after feeling overwhelmed by the large campus and big-city transition from his small hometown of French Lick, Indiana.

== Roster ==
| No. | Name | Position | Ht. | Year | Hometown |
|---|---|---|---|---|---|
| 20 | Bobby Wilkerson | G/F | 6–7 | Jr. | Anderson, Indiana |
| 21 | Quinn Buckner | G | 6–3 | Jr. | Phoenix, Illinois |
| 22 | Wayne Radford | G/F | 6–3 | Fr. | Indianapolis, Indiana |
| 24 | Steve Ahlfeld | G | 6–1 | Sr. | Wabash, Indiana |
| 25 | Doug Allen | F | 6–6 | Sr. | Champaign, Illinois |
| 30 | John Kamstra | G | 6–1 | Sr. | Frankfort, Indiana |
| 31 | John Laskowski | G/F | 6–5 | Sr. | South Bend, Indiana |
| 32 | Mark Haymore | F/C | 6–8 | Fr. | Shaker Heights, Ohio |
| 33 | Tom Abernethy | F | 6–7 | Jr. | South Bend, Indiana |
| 34 | Steve Green | F | 6–7 | Sr. | Sellersburg, Indiana |
| 40 | Jim Wisman | G | 6–2 | Fr. | Quincy, Illinois |
| 42 | Scott May | F | 6–7 | Jr. | Sandusky, Ohio |
| 43 | Don Noort | C | 6–8 | Jr. | Worth, Illinois |
| 45 | Jim Crews | G | 6–5 | Jr. | Normal, Illinois |
| 54 | Kent Benson | C | 6–11 | So. | New Castle, Indiana |

== Regular season game against Kentucky ==
On December 7, 1974, Indiana and Kentucky met in the regular season in Bloomington with a 98–74 Indiana win. Near the end of the game, Indiana coach Bobby Knight went to the Kentucky bench where the official was standing to complain about a call. Before he left, Knight hit Kentucky coach Joe B. Hall in the back of the head. UK's assistant coach Lynn Nance, a former FBI agent who was about 6 feet 5 inches, had to be restrained by Hall from hitting Knight. Hall later said, "It publicly humiliated me."

== NCAA tournament ==
Following the one-sided regular season game in early December, Indiana and Kentucky met again in the 1975 Elite Eight in Dayton, Ohio, the Mideast regional final. Entering that game on March 22, the top-ranked Hoosiers had a 34-game winning streak and Kentucky (24–4) was ranked fifth. Kentucky won by two points, 92–90. The game made USA Today's list of the greatest NCAA tournament games of all time. The win put Kentucky in the Final Four in San Diego, where they dropped the NCAA title game to UCLA in John Wooden's final game as head coach.

== Schedule and results ==
| Date time, TV | Rank^{#} | Opponent^{#} | Result | Record | Site city, state |
Non-conference regular season
| 11/30/1974* | No. 3 | Tennessee Tech | W 113–60 | 1–0 | Assembly Hall; Bloomington, Indiana |
| 12/4/1974* | No. 3 | at No. 7 Kansas | W 74–70 ^{OT} | 2–0 | Allen Fieldhouse; Lawrence, Kansas |
| 12/7/1974* | No. 3 | No. 15 Kentucky; Indiana–Kentucky rivalry | W 98–74 | 3–0 | Assembly Hall; Bloomington, Indiana |
| 12/11/1974* | No. 3 | at No. 11 Notre Dame | W 94–84 | 4–0 | Joyce Center; Notre Dame, Indiana |
| 12/14/1974* | No. 3 | vs. Texas A&M | W 90–55 | 5–0 | Market Square Arena; Indianapolis |
| 12/16/1974* | No. 3 | Toledo | W 92–70 | 6–0 | Assembly Hall; Bloomington, Indiana |
| 12/20/1974* | No. 2 | Creighton; Indiana Classic | W 71–53 | 7–0 | Assembly Hall; Bloomington, Indiana |
| 12/21/1974* | No. 2 | Nebraska; Indiana Classic | W 97–60 | 8–0 | Assembly Hall; Bloomington, Indiana |
| 12/26/1974* | No. 2 | vs. Florida; Rainbow Classic Quarterfinals | W 98–84 | 9–0 | Neal S. Blaisdell Center; Honolulu, HI |
| 12/27/1974* | No. 2 | vs. Ohio State; Rainbow Classic Semifinals | W 102–71 | 10–0 | Neal S. Blaisdell Center; Honolulu, HI |
| 12/30/1974* | No. 2 | vs. Hawaii; Rainbow Classic Championship | W 69–52 | 11–0 | Neal S. Blaisdell Center; Honolulu, HI |
Big Ten regular season
| 1/4/1975 | No. 2 | at Michigan State | W 107–55 | 12–0 (1–0) | Jenison Fieldhouse; East Lansing, Michigan |
| 1/6/1975 | No. 2 | at No. 17 Michigan | W 90–76 | 13–0 (2–0) | Crisler Arena; Ann Arbor, Michigan |
| 1/11/1975 | No. 1 | Iowa | W 102–49 | 14–0 (3–0) | Assembly Hall; Bloomington, Indiana |
| 1/13/1975 | No. 1 | Minnesota | W 79–59 | 15–0 (4–0) | Assembly Hall; Bloomington, Indiana |
| 1/18/1975 | No. 1 | at Northwestern | W 82–56 | 16–0 (5–0) | Welsh-Ryan Arena; Evanston, Illinois |
| 1/20/1975 | No. 1 | at Wisconsin | W 89–69 | 17–0 (6–0) | Wisconsin Field House; Madison, Wisconsin |
| 1/25/1975 | No. 1 | No. 20 Purdue; Rivalry | W 104–71 | 18–0 (7–0) | Assembly Hall; Bloomington, Indiana |
| 1/27/1975 | No. 1 | Illinois; Rivalry | W 73–57 | 19–0 (8–0) | Assembly Hall; Bloomington, Indiana |
| 2/1/1975 | No. 1 | at Ohio State | W 72–66 | 20–0 (9–0) | St. John Arena; Columbus, Ohio |
| 2/3/1975 | No. 1 | Michigan | W 74–48 | 21–0 (10–0) | Assembly Hall; Bloomington, Indiana |
| 2/8/1975 | No. 1 | at Iowa | W 79–56 | 22–0 (11–0) | Iowa Field House; Iowa City, Iowa |
| 2/10/1975 | No. 1 | at Minnesota | W 69–54 | 23–0 (12–0) | Williams Arena; Minneapolis |
| 2/15/1975 | No. 1 | Northwestern | W 82–58 | 24–0 (13–0) | Assembly Hall; Bloomington, Indiana |
| 2/17/1975 | No. 1 | Wisconsin | W 93–58 | 25–0 (14–0) | Assembly Hall; Bloomington, Indiana |
| 2/22/1975 | No. 1 | at Purdue; Rivalry | W 83–82 | 26–0 (15–0) | Mackey Arena; West Lafayette, Indiana |
| 2/24/1975 | No. 1 | at Illinois; Rivalry | W 112–89 | 27–0 (16–0) | Assembly Hall; Champaign, Illinois |
| 3/1/1975 | No. 1 | Ohio State | W 86–78 | 28–0 (17–0) | Assembly Hall; Bloomington, Indiana |
| 3/8/1975 | No. 1 | Michigan State | W 94–79 | 29–0 (18–0) | Assembly Hall; Bloomington, Indiana |
NCAA Tournament
| 3/15/1975* | No. 1 | vs. UTEP; Quarterfinals | W 78–52 | 30–0 | Memorial Coliseum; Lexington, Kentucky |
| 3/20/1975* | No. 1 | vs. Oregon State; Sweet Sixteen | W 81–71 | 31–0 | University of Daytona Arena; Dayton, Ohio |
| 3/22/1975* | No. 1 | vs. No. 5 Kentucky; Elite Eight | L 90–92 | 31–1 | University of Dayton Arena; Dayton, Ohio |
*Non-conference game. ^{#}Rankings from AP Poll. (#) Tournament seedings in parentheses.

== Team players drafted into the NBA ==
| Year | Round | Pick | Player | NBA club |
| 1975 | 2 | 30 | Steve Green | Chicago Bulls |
| 1975 | 2 | 32 | John Laskowski | Chicago Bulls |
| 1976 | 1 | 2 | Scott May | Chicago Bulls |
| 1976 | 1 | 7 | Quinn Buckner | Milwaukee Bucks |
| 1976 | 1 | 11 | Bob Wilkerson | Seattle SuperSonics |
| 1976 | 3 | 43 | Tom Abernethy | Los Angeles Lakers |
| 1977 | 1 | 1 | Kent Benson | Milwaukee Bucks |
| 1978 | 2 | 27 | Wayne Radford | Indiana Pacers |
