= 1974–75 Iowa Hawkeyes men's basketball team =

American college basketball season

1974–75 Iowa Hawkeyes men's basketball
- Conference: Big Ten Conference
- Record: 10–16 (7-11 Big Ten)
- Head coach: Lute Olson (1st season)
- Assistant coach: Jim Rosborough
- MVP: Dan Frost
- Home arena: Iowa Field House (Capacity: 13,365)

1974–75 Big Ten Conference men's basketball standings
	Conf.				Overall
Team	W		L	PCT	W		L	PCT
No. 3 Indiana	18	–	0	1.000	31	–	1	.969
No. 19 Michigan	12	–	6	.667	19	–	8	.704
Minnesota	11	–	7	.611	18	–	8	.692
Purdue	11	–	7	.611	17	–	11	.607
Michigan State	10	–	8	.556	17	–	9	.654
Ohio State	8	–	10	.444	14	–	14	.500
Iowa	7	–	11	.389	10	–	16	.385
Wisconsin	5	–	13	.278	8	–	18	.308
Illinois	4	–	14	.222	8	–	18	.308
Northwestern	4	–	14	.222	6	–	20	.231
Rankings from AP Poll

The 1974–75 Iowa Hawkeyes men's basketball team represented the University of Iowa as members of the Big Ten Conference. The team was led by first-year head coach Lute Olson, and played their home games at the Iowa Field House. They finished the season 10–16 overall and 7–11 in Big Ten play.

== Roster ==
1974–75 Iowa Hawkeyes men's basketball team
Players
Coaches

Pos.	#	Name	Height	Weight	Year	Hometown
G	10	Cal Wulfsberg	6 ft 3 in (1.91 m)	—	Jr
F	30	Dan Frost	6 ft 7 in (2.01 m)	—	Jr	Long Beach, California
F	32	Larry Parker	6 ft 6 in (1.98 m)	—	Jr
G	34	Scott Thompson	6 ft 3 in (1.91 m)	—	Jr	Moline, Illinois
G		Archie Mays	—	—	Jr	Dayton, Ohio
F	40	Terry Drake	6 ft 7 in (2.01 m)	—	Fr	Elgin, Illinois
F		Fred Haberecht	6 ft 8 in (2.03 m)	—	Jr
C	50	Mike Gatens	6 ft 9 in (2.06 m)	—	Jr
F/C	54	Bruce "Sky" King	6 ft 8 in (2.03 m)	—	So	Dayton, Ohio

Head coach

Lute Olson

Assistant coach(es)

- Jim Rosborough

Legend

- (C) Team captain
- (S) Suspended
- (I) Ineligible
- (W) Walk-on
- Injured
- Current redshirt

== Schedule/results ==
Date time, TV	Rank^{#}	Opponent^{#}	Result	Record	Site city, state
Non-conference regular season
11/30/1974*		VCU	W 95-80	1-0	Iowa Field House; Iowa City, IA
12/3/1974*		at Drake	W 86-81	2-0	Veterans Memorial Auditorium; Des Moines, IA
12/7/1974*		at No. 7 Kansas	L 54-89	2-1	Allen Fieldhouse; Lawrence, KS
12/12/1974*		Iowa State; Rivalry	W 77-66	3-1	Iowa Field House (13,360); Iowa City, IA
12/21/1974*		San Jose State	L 103-105	3-2	Iowa Field House; Iowa City, IA
12/27/1974*		vs. Oregon State; Far West Classic	L 60-97	3-3	Portland, OR
12/28/1974*		vs. Wake Forest; Far West Classic	L 71-92	3-4	Portland, OR
12/30/1974*		vs. Boston College; Far West Classic	L 81-86	3-5	Portland, OR
Big Ten Conference Season
1/2/1975		at Northwestern	W 75-73	4-5 (1-0)	Welsh-Ryan Arena; Evanston, IL
1/4/1975		Illinois	W 95-70	5-5 (2-0)	Iowa Field House; Iowa City, IA
1/11/1975		at No. 1 Indiana	L 49-102	5-7 (2-2)	Assembly Hall (17,526); Bloomington, IN
1/25/1975		No. 17 Minnesota	W 53-44	7-9 (4-4)	Iowa Field House; Iowa City, IA
2/8/1975		No. 1 Indiana	L 56-79	7-12 (4-7)	Iowa Field House; Iowa City, IA
2/22/1975		at Minnesota	L 67-68	7-16 (4-11)	Williams Arena; Minneapolis, MN
3/3/1975		Northwestern	W 65-58 ^{2OT}	9-16 (6-11)	Iowa Field House; Iowa City, IA
3/8/1975		at Illinois	W 73-70	10-16 (7-11)	Assembly Hall; Champaign, IL
*Non-conference game. ^{#}Rankings from AP Poll. (#) Tournament seedings in parentheses.
