= 1975–76 Iowa State Cyclones men's basketball team =

American college basketball season

1975–76 Iowa State Cyclones men's basketball
- Conference: Big Eight Conference
- Record: 3–24 (3–11 Big Eight)
- Head coach: Ken Trickey (2nd season)
- Assistant coaches: Gus Guydon; Jack Sutter
- Home arena: Hilton Coliseum

1975–76 Big Eight Conference men's basketball standings
	Conf.				Overall
Team	W		L	PCT	W		L	PCT
No. 14 Missouri	12	–	2	.857	26	–	5	.839
Kansas State	11	–	3	.786	20	–	8	.714
Nebraska	10	–	4	.714	19	–	8	.704
Kansas	6	–	8	.429	13	–	13	.500
Oklahoma	6	–	8	.429	9	–	17	.346
Oklahoma State	4	–	10	.286	10	–	16	.385
Colorado	4	–	10	.286	7	–	19	.269
Iowa State	3	–	11	.214	3	–	24	.111
Rankings from AP poll

The 1975–76 Iowa State Cyclones men's basketball team represented Iowa State University during the 1975–76 NCAA Division I men's basketball season. The Cyclones were coached by Ken Trickey, who was in his second season with the Cyclones. They played their home games at Hilton Coliseum in Ames, Iowa.

They finished the season 3–24, 3–11 in Big Eight play to finish in last place. Head Coach Ken Trickey resigned on January 21, 1976.

== Roster ==
1975–76 Iowa State Cyclones men's basketball team
Players
Coaches

Pos.	#	Name	Height	Weight	Year	Hometown
F	30	Mike Benjamin	6 ft 6 in (1.98 m)	190 lb (86 kg)	Sr	LaPorte, Indiana
G	10	Jeff Branstetter	6 ft 0 in (1.83 m)	175 lb (79 kg)	Sr	Harlan, Iowa
F	42	Steve Burgason	6 ft 6 in (1.98 m)	210 lb (95 kg)	Jr	Ames, Iowa
G	14	Roman Butkus	6 ft 2 in (1.88 m)	185 lb (84 kg)	Jr	Chicago
G	15	Julian Butler	6 ft 3 in (1.91 m)	175 lb (79 kg)	Fr	Key West, Florida
		Al Dixon	—	—
F	33	Calvin Freeman	6 ft 4 in (1.93 m)	185 lb (84 kg)	Jr	Dayton, Ohio
		Bob Higgins	—	—
G	22	Hercle Ivy (C)	6 ft 3 in (1.91 m)	195 lb (88 kg)	Sr	St. Louis, Missouri
F	44	Art Johnson	6 ft 6 in (1.98 m)	190 lb (86 kg)	Sr	Indianapolis
C	54	Jim Murphy	6 ft 7 in (2.01 m)	205 lb (93 kg)	So	Treynor, Iowa
G	25	Andrew Parker	6 ft 4 in (1.93 m)	185 lb (84 kg)	Fr	Fort Lauderdale, Florida
F	32	Charles Peake	6 ft 5 in (1.96 m)	205 lb (93 kg)	Jr	Columbus, Ohio
C	52	Steve Powell	6 ft 9 in (2.06 m)	220 lb (100 kg)	Jr	Chattanooga, Tennessee
F	40	Dale Smith	6 ft 7 in (2.01 m)	210 lb (95 kg)	Jr	Jefferson, Iowa
F	34	Evan Varley	6 ft 4 in (1.93 m)	180 lb (82 kg)	Jr	Menlo, Iowa

Head coach

- Ken Trickey

Assistant coach(es)

Gus Guydon
Jack Sutter

Legend

- (C) Team captain
- (S) Suspended
- (I) Ineligible
- (W) Walk-on
- Injured
- Current redshirt

== Schedule and results ==
Date time, TV	Rank^{#}	Opponent^{#}	Result	Record	Site city, state
Regular season
November 29, 1975*; 8:00 pm		Vanderbilt	L 80–105	0–1	Hilton Coliseum; Ames, Iowa
December 2, 1975*; 7:35 pm		South Dakota	L 75–79	0–2	Hilton Coliseum; Ames, Iowa
December 6, 1975*; 7:35 pm		at Drake; Iowa's Big Four	L 83–98	0–3	Veterans Memorial Auditorium; Des Moines, Iowa
December 9, 1975*; 7:35 pm		at TCU	L 83–95	0–4	Daniel Meyer Coliseum; Fort Worth, Texas
December 12, 1975*; 7:35 pm, WOI/Iowa PBS		Iowa; CyHawk Rivalry	L 77–91	0–5	Hilton Coliseum; Ames, Iowa
December 17, 1975*; 7:35 pm		Creighton	L 61–73	0–6	Hilton Coliseum; Ames, Iowa
December 20, 1975*; 2:00 pm		at Nebraska-Omaha	L 73–84	0–7	Omaha Civic Auditorium; Omaha, Nebraska
December 26, 1975*; 7:05 pm		vs. Kansas State; Big Eight Holiday Tournament Quarterfinals	L 67–81	0–8	Kemper Arena; Kansas City, Missouri
December 29, 1975*; 1:05 pm		vs. Oklahoma State; Big Eight Holiday Tournament Consolation Semifinals	L 71–88	0–9	Kemper Arena; Kansas City, Missouri
December 30, 1975*; 1:05 pm		vs. Oklahoma; Big Eight Holiday Tournament Seventh Place	L 51–71	0–10	Kemper Arena; Kansas City, Missouri
January 8, 1976*; 10:00 pm		at San Diego State	L 75–92	0–11	Peterson Gymnasium; San Diego
January 10, 1976*; 2:10 pm, TVS–NBC		No. 5 UNLV	L 82–88	0–12	Hilton Coliseum; Ames, Iowa
January 12, 1976*; 8:30 pm		at Saint Louis	L 64–93	0–13	St. Louis Arena (2,459); St. Louis, Missouri
January 17, 1976; 7:35 pm		at Oklahoma State	W 93–89 ^{OT}	1–13 (1–0)	Gallagher Hall; Stillwater, Oklahoma
January 20, 1976; 7:35 pm		at Kansas	L 60–68	1–14 (1–1)	Allen Fieldhouse (9,760); Lawrence, Kansas
January 24, 1976; 7:35 pm		No. 18 Missouri	L 68–84	1–15 (1–2)	Hilton Coliseum; Ames, Iowa
January 28, 1976; 7:35 pm		at Kansas State	L 66–84	1–16 (1–3)	Ahearn Fieldhouse; Manhattan, Kansas
January 31, 1976; 1:10 pm, WOI		Colorado	W 82–71	2–16 (2–3)	Hilton Coliseum; Ames, Iowa
February 4, 1976; 7:30 pm		at Oklahoma	L 63–75	2–17 (2–4)	Lloyd Noble Center; Norman, Oklahoma
February 7, 1976; 7:35 pm		Nebraska	L 56–66	2–18 (2–5)	Hilton Coliseum; Ames, Iowa
February 11, 1976; 7:35 pm		Kansas	L 53–61	2–19 (2–6)	Hilton Coliseum; Ames, Iowa
February 14, 1976; 1:10 pm, WOI		at No. 14 Missouri	L 64–85	2–20 (2–7)	Hearnes Center; Columbia, Missouri
February 18, 1976; 7:35 pm		Oklahoma State	L 71–83	2–21 (2–8)	Hilton Coliseum; Ames, Iowa
February 21, 1976; 8:35 pm		at Colorado	L 83–92	2–22 (2–9)	Balch Fieldhouse; Boulder, Colorado
February 27, 1976; 7:35 pm		Kansas State	L 67–80	2–23 (2–10)	Hilton Coliseum; Ames, Iowa
March 3, 1976; 7:35 pm		Oklahoma	W 62–57	3–23 (3–10)	Hilton Coliseum; Ames, Iowa
March 6, 1976; 7:35 pm		Nebraska	L 66–82	3–24 (3–11)	Nebraska Coliseum; Lincoln, Nebraska
*Non-conference game. ^{#}Rankings from AP poll. (#) Tournament seedings in parentheses. All times are in Central Time.
