= 1974–75 Michigan State Spartans men's basketball team =

American college basketball season

1974–75 Michigan State Spartans men's basketball
- Conference: Big Ten Conference
- Record: 17–9 (10–8 Big Ten)
- Head coach: Gus Ganakas (6th season)
- Assistant coaches: Dick Versace; Pat Miller; Vernon Payne
- Captain: Lindsay Hairston
- Home arena: Jenison Fieldhouse

1974–75 Big Ten Conference men's basketball standings
	Conf.				Overall
Team	W		L	PCT	W		L	PCT
No. 3 Indiana	18	–	0	1.000	31	–	1	.969
No. 19 Michigan	12	–	6	.667	19	–	8	.704
Minnesota	11	–	7	.611	18	–	8	.692
Purdue	11	–	7	.611	17	–	11	.607
Michigan State	10	–	8	.556	17	–	9	.654
Ohio State	8	–	10	.444	14	–	14	.500
Iowa	7	–	11	.389	10	–	16	.385
Wisconsin	5	–	13	.278	8	–	18	.308
Illinois	4	–	14	.222	8	–	18	.308
Northwestern	4	–	14	.222	6	–	20	.231
Rankings from AP Poll

The 1974–75 Michigan State Spartans men's basketball team represented Michigan State University in the 1974–75 NCAA Division I men's basketball season as members of the Big Ten Conference. They played their home games at Jenison Fieldhouse in East Lansing, Michigan and were coached by Gus Ganakas in his sixth year as head coach of the Spartans. MSU finished the season 17–9, 10–8 in Big Ten play to finish in fifth place.

== Previous season ==
The Spartans finished the 1973–74 season 13–11, 8–6 in Big Ten play to finish in a tie for fourth place.

== Player walk-out ==
The season stands as one of the ugliest moments in MSU athletics history as 10 players, led by captain Lindsay Hairston, followed by Bob Chapman, Pete Davis, Terry Furlow, Bill Glover, Thomas McGill, Cedric Milton, Lovelle Rivers, Benny White and Edgar Wilson, walked out of a team meeting before their game against Indiana on January 4, 1975. At the time, it was assumed that the players were objecting to the fact that freshman Jeff Tropf, who was white, was starting over more experienced black players. Later, more complaints came to light including the arena being too cold during practice due to construction and the school's lack of emphasis on basketball. When the players returned an hour before game time, head coach Gus Ganakas suspended the players.

As a result, the team fielded junior varsity players and Tropf for the game against Indiana and were blown out 107–55. The next day, the suspended players aired their grievances with Ganakas, apologized, and were reinstated to the team. Tropf left the school after the season.

== Roster and statistics ==
1974–75 Michigan State Spartans men's basketball team
No	Name	Pos	Year	Height	Pts	Reb
12	William Glover	G	SR	6–2	12.0	1.4
22	Lovelle Rivers	F	SR	6–5	0.8	
23	Benny White	G	JR	5–9	6.8	1.7
24	Cedric Milton	C	JR	6–9	2.3	2.6
25	Terry Furlow	F	JR	6–5	20.4	6.8
32	Peter Davis	G	SR	6–1	9.0	0.8
33	Edgar Wilson	F	SO	6–5	3.4	2.6
41	Thomas McGill	F	SR	6–4	1.4	1.2
42	James Dudley	F	FR	6–5	0.9	0.8
44	Robert Chapman	G	SO	6–2	4.4	1.3
45	Lindsay Hairston	C	SR	6–7	19.3	11.5
52	Jeffrey Tropf	C	FR	6–7	5.1	5.4
	Dave Jackson					
	Mark Talaga					

== Schedule and results ==
Date time, TV	Rank^{#}	Opponent^{#}	Result	Record	Site city, state
Regular season
Dec 2, 1974*		Central Michigan	W 82–78	1–0	Jenison Fieldhouse; East Lansing, MI
Dec 7, 1974*		Eastern Michigan	W 92–60	2–0	Jennison Fieldhouse; East Lansing, MI
Dec 14, 1974*		Western Michigan	W 62–59	3–0	Jennison Fieldhouse; East Lansing, MI
Dec 20, 1974*		at San Francisco; Cable Car Classic semifinals	W 86–78	4–0	War Memorial Gymnasium; San Francisco, CA
Dec 21, 1974*		vs. Long Beach State; Cable Car Classic final	L 62–74	4–1	War Memorial Gymnasium; San Francisco, CA
Dec 23, 1974*		at Detroit Mercy	W 72–69	5–1	Calihan Hall; Detroit, MI
Jan 2, 1975		at No. 18 Purdue	L 86–93	5–2 (0–1)	Mackey Arena; West Lafayette, IN
Jan 4, 1975		No. 2 Indiana	L 55–107	5–3 (0–2)	Jenison Fieldhouse; East Lansing, MI
Jan 6, 1975		Ohio State	W 88–84	6–3 (1–2)	Jenison Fieldhouse; East Lansing, MI
Jan 11, 1975		No. 11 Michigan; Rivalry	W 86–78	7–3 (2–2)	Jenison Fieldhouse; East Lansing, MI
Jan 18, 1975		at No. 16 Minnesota	L 71–82	7–4 (2–3)	Williams Arena; Minneapolis, MN
Jan 20, 1975		at Iowa	L 79–83	7–5 (2–4)	Iowa Field House; Iowa City, IA
Jan 25, 1975		Wisconsin	W 105–87	8–5 (3–4)	Jenison Fieldhouse; East Lansing, MI
Jan 27, 1975		Northwestern	W 54–50	9–5 (4–4)	Jenison Fieldhouse; East Lansing, MI
Feb 1, 1975		at Illinois	W 75–60	10–5 (5–4)	Assembly Hall; Champaign, IL
Feb 3, 1975		at Ohio State	W 101–83	11–5 (6–4)	St. John Arena; Columbus, OH
Feb 5, 1975*		at No. 14 Notre Dame	W 76–73	12–5	Purcell Pavilion at the Joyce Center; South Bend, IN
Feb 8, 1975		at Michigan; Rivalry	L 84–96	12–6 (6–5)	Crisler Arena; Ann Arbor, MI
Feb 15, 1975		Minnesota	W 86–81	13–6 (7–5)	Jenison Fieldhouse; East Lansing, MI
Feb 17, 1975		Iowa	W 90–78	14–6 (8–5)	Jenison Fieldhouse; East Lansing, MI
Feb 22, 1975		at Wisconsin	L 96–103	14–7 (8–6)	Wisconsin Field House; Madison, WI
Feb 24, 1975		at Northwestern	L 66–67	14–8 (8–7)	Welsh-Ryan Arena; Evanston, IL
Mar 1, 1975		Illinois	W 96–82	15–8 (9–7)	Jenison Fieldhouse; East Lansing, MI
Mar 3, 1975		Purdue	W 84–82	16–8 (10–7)	Jenison Fieldhouse; East Lansing, MI
Mar 8, 1975		at No. 1 Indiana	L 79–94	16–9 (10–8)	Assembly Hall; Bloomington, IN
*Non-conference game. ^{#}Rankings from AP Poll. (#) Tournament seedings in parentheses. Source

== Awards and honors ==
- Terry Furlow – All-Big Ten First Team
- Terry Furlow – Big Ten Scoring Champion (20.2 ppg in-conference)
- Lindsay Hairston – All-Big Ten First Team
