= 1975–76 Kansas Jayhawks men's basketball team =

American college basketball season

1975–76 Kansas Jayhawks men's basketball
- Conference: Big Eight Conference
- Record: 13–13 (6–8 Big 8)
- Head coach: Ted Owens (12th season)
- Assistant coaches: Sam Miranda (10th season); Duncan Reid (3rd season)
- Captain: Norm Cook
- Home arena: Allen Fieldhouse

1975–76 Big Eight Conference men's basketball standings
	Conf.				Overall
Team	W		L	PCT	W		L	PCT
No. 14 Missouri	12	–	2	.857	26	–	5	.839
Kansas State	11	–	3	.786	20	–	8	.714
Nebraska	10	–	4	.714	19	–	8	.704
Kansas	6	–	8	.429	13	–	13	.500
Oklahoma	6	–	8	.429	9	–	17	.346
Oklahoma State	4	–	10	.286	10	–	16	.385
Colorado	4	–	10	.286	7	–	19	.269
Iowa State	3	–	11	.214	3	–	24	.111
Rankings from AP poll

The 1975–76 Kansas Jayhawks men's basketball team represented the University of Kansas during the 1975–76 NCAA Division I men's basketball season.

== Roster ==
- Norm Cook
- Clint Johnson
- Ken Koenigs
- Herb Nobles
- Paul Mokeski
- Milt Gibson
- Bradley Ridgway
- Reuben Shelton
- Brad Sanders
- Chris Barnthouse
- Arnie Baum
- Bob Worthington

== Schedule ==
Date time, TV	Rank^{#}	Opponent^{#}	Result	Record	Site city, state
November 29*		Murray State	W 72-56	1-0	Allen Fieldhouse; Lawrence, KS
December 2*		at SMU	L 66-75	1-1	Moody Coliseum; University Park, TX
December 6*		Saint Louis	W 70-64	2-1	Allen Fieldhouse; Lawrence, KS
December 8*		No. 9 Notre Dame	L 64-72	2-2	Allen Fieldhouse; Lawrence, KS
December 11*		Boise State	W 61-56	3-2	Allen Fieldhouse; Lawrence, KS
December 13*		No. 14 Kentucky	L 48-54	3-3	Allen Fieldhouse; Lawrence, KS
December 19*		Yale	W 63-54	4-3	Allen Fieldhouse; Lawrence, KS
December 20*		La Salle	W 74-73	5-3	Allen Fieldhouse; Lawrence, KS
December 27		vs. Nebraska	W 69-66	6-3	Kemper Arena; Kansas City, MO
December 29		vs. Colorado	W 70-50	7-3	Kemper Arena; Kansas City, MO
December 30		vs. Missouri; Border War	L 69-79	7-4	Kemper Arena; Kansas City, MO
January 8*		at Oral Roberts	L 70-73	7-5	Mabee Center; Tulsa, OK
January 17		at No. 20 Missouri; Border War	L 69-99	7-6 (0-1)	Hearnes Center; Columbia, MO
January 20		Iowa State	W 68-60	8-6 (1-1)	Allen Fieldhouse; Lawrence, KS
January 24		at Oklahoma State	L 59-63	8-7 (1-2)	Gallagher-Iba Arena; Stillwater, OK
January 28		at Colorado	W 51-50	9-7 (2-2)	Balch Fieldhouse; Boulder, CO
January 31		Kansas State; Sunflower Showdown	W 62-57	10-7 (3-2)	Allen Fieldhouse; Lawrence, KS
February 4		at Nebraska	L 54-57	10-8 (3-3)	Nebraska Coliseum; Lincoln, NE
February 7		Oklahoma	L 63-64	10-9 (3-4)	Allen Fieldhouse; Lawrence, KS
February 11		at Iowa State	W 61-53	11-9 (4-4)	James H. Hilton Coliseum; Ames, IA
February 14		Oklahoma State	W 70-60	12-9 (5-4)	Allen Fieldhouse; Lawrence, KS
February 18		No. 14 Missouri; Border War	L 60-61	12-10 (5-5)	Allen Fieldhouse; Lawrence, KS
February 21		at Kansas State; Sunflower Showdown	L 54-69	12-11 (5-6)	Ahearn Field House; Manhattan, KS
February 28		Colorado	L 66-68	12-12 (5-7)	Allen Fieldhouse; Lawrence, KS
March 3		Nebraska	L 58-62	12-13 (5-8)	Allen Fieldhouse; Lawrence, KS
March 6		at Oklahoma	W 55-50	13-13 (6-9)	Lloyd Noble Center; Norman, OK
*Non-conference game. ^{#}Rankings from AP Poll. (#) Tournament seedings in parentheses.
