= 1974–75 Iowa State Cyclones men's basketball team =

American college basketball season

1974–75 Iowa State Cyclones men's basketball
- Conference: Big Eight Conference
- Record: 10–16 (4–10 Big Eight)
- Head coach: Ken Trickey (1st season)
- Home arena: Hilton Coliseum

The 1974–75 Iowa State Cyclones men's basketball team represented Iowa State University during the 1974–75 NCAA Division I men's basketball season. The Cyclones were coached by Ken Trickey, who was in his first season with the Cyclones. They played their home games at Hilton Coliseum in Ames, Iowa.

They finished the season 10–16, 4–10 in Big Eight play to finish in a tie for seventh place.

1974–75 Big Eight Conference men's basketball standings
	Conf.				Overall
Team	W		L	PCT	W		L	PCT
Kansas	11	–	3	.786	19	–	8	.704
No. 15 Kansas State	10	–	4	.714	20	–	9	.690
Missouri	9	–	5	.643	18	–	9	.667
Nebraska	7	–	7	.500	14	–	12	.538
Oklahoma	6	–	8	.429	13	–	13	.500
Oklahoma State	5	–	9	.357	10	–	16	.385
Iowa State	4	–	10	.286	10	–	16	.385
Colorado	4	–	10	.286	7	–	19	.269
Rankings from AP Poll

== Roster ==
1974–75 Iowa State Cyclones men's basketball team
Players
Coaches

Pos.	#	Name	Height	Weight	Year	Hometown
F		Mike Benjamin	6 ft 6 in (1.98 m)	195 lb (88 kg)	Jr	LaPorte, Indiana
G		Jeff Branstetter	6 ft 0 in (1.83 m)	170 lb (77 kg)	Jr	Harlan, Iowa
F		Steve Burgason	6 ft 7 in (2.01 m)	210 lb (95 kg)	So	Ames, Iowa
F		Lodell Burnett	6 ft 5 in (1.96 m)	200 lb (91 kg)	So	Chicago
G		Roman Butkus	6 ft 2 in (1.88 m)	175 lb (79 kg)	So	Chicago
C		Craig DeLoss (C)	6 ft 10 in (2.08 m)	215 lb (98 kg)	Sr	Spencer, Iowa
G		Chuck Fritz	6 ft 2 in (1.88 m)	170 lb (77 kg)	Fr	Hinsdale, Illinois
G		Hercle Ivy	6 ft 3 in (1.91 m)	190 lb (86 kg)	Jr	St. Louis, Missouri
G		Tony Jernigan	6 ft 2 in (1.88 m)	187 lb (85 kg)	So	Gary, Indiana
G		John John (C)	6 ft 3 in (1.91 m)	175 lb (79 kg)	Sr	Des Moines, Iowa
F		Art Johnson	6 ft 7 in (2.01 m)	205 lb (93 kg)	Jr	Indianapolis
C		Larry Loots (C)	6 ft 9 in (2.06 m)	225 lb (102 kg)	Sr	Ames, Iowa
C		Alex Mazeika	6 ft 10 in (2.08 m)	225 lb (102 kg)	So	Clinton, Iowa
F		Jim Murphy	6 ft 7 in (2.01 m)	200 lb (91 kg)	Fr	Treynor, Iowa
G		Tom Norman	6 ft 2 in (1.88 m)	175 lb (79 kg)	Fr	Freeport, Illinois
F		Dale Smith	6 ft 7 in (2.01 m)	215 lb (98 kg)	So	Jefferson, Iowa
F		Jim Thorup	6 ft 7 in (2.01 m)	220 lb (100 kg)	So	Des Moines, Iowa

Head coach

- Ken Trickey

Assistant coach(es)

Legend

- (C) Team captain
- (S) Suspended
- (I) Ineligible
- (W) Walk-on
- Injured
- Current redshirt

== Schedule and results ==
Date time, TV	Rank^{#}	Opponent^{#}	Result	Record	Site city, state
Regular season
November 29, 1974*; 7:30 pm		Mankato State	W 99–81	1–0	Hilton Coliseum; Ames, Iowa
December 3, 1974*; 7:30 pm		at Bradley	L 72–93	1–1	Robertson Memorial Field House (6,900); Peoria, Illinois
December 7, 1974*; 1:30 pm		at Wisconsin	L 84–86	1–2	Wisconsin Field House; Madison, Wisconsin
December 9, 1974*; 7:30 pm		Illinois	L 71–77	1–3	Hilton Coliseum; Ames, Iowa
December 12, 1974*; 7:35 pm		at Iowa; CyHawk Rivalry	L 66–77	1–4	Iowa Fieldhouse; Iowa City, Iowa
December 14, 1974*; 7:35 pm		TCU	W 91–90	2–4	Hilton Coliseum; Ames, Iowa
December 19, 1974*; 7:35 pm, WOI		Drake; Iowa Big Four	L 64–65	2–5	Hilton Coliseum; Ames, Iowa
December 21, 1974*; 7:35 pm		Northern Iowa; Iowa Big Four	W 123–70	3–5	Hilton Coliseum; Ames, Iowa
December 27, 1974*; 7:05 pm		vs. Colorado; Big Eight Holiday Tournament Quarterfinals	W 107–82	4–5	Kemper Arena; Kansas City, Missouri
December 28, 1974*; 9:05 pm		vs. Kansas State; Big Eight Holiday Tournament Semifinals	W 82–64	5–5	Kemper Arena (12,869); Kansas City, Missouri
December 30, 1974*; 9:05 pm		vs. Kansas; Big Eight Holiday Tournament Championship	L 75–76	5–6	Kemper Arena; Kansas City, Missouri
January 6, 1975*; 7:35 pm		UW-Oshkosh	W 110–106	6–6	Hilton Coliseum; Ames, Iowa
January 18, 1975; 7:35 pm		Oklahoma State	L 95–101	6–7 (0–1)	Hilton Coliseum; Ames, Iowa
January 22, 1975; 7:35 pm		No. 18 Kansas	W 96–81	7–7 (1–1)	Hilton Coliseum; Ames, Iowa
January 25, 1975; 2:10 pm, Big Eight		at Missouri	L 85–87	7–8 (1–2)	Hearnes Center; Columbia, Missouri
January 29, 1975; 7:35 pm		Kansas State	L 93–108	7–9 (1–3)	Hilton Coliseum; Ames, Iowa
February 1, 1975; 6:35 pm		at Colorado	W 101–90	8–9 (2–3)	Balch Fieldhouse; Boulder, Colorado
February 5, 1975; 7:35 pm		Oklahoma	L 89–91	8–10 (2–4)	Hilton Coliseum; Ames, Iowa
February 8, 1975; 7:35 pm		at Nebraska	L 62–75	8–11 (2–5)	Nebraska Coliseum; Lincoln, Nebraska
February 12, 1975; 7:35 pm		at Kansas	L 62–76	8–12 (2–6)	Allen Fieldhouse; Lawrence, Kansas
February 15, 1975; 7:35 pm		Missouri	L 86–96	8–13 (2–7)	Hilton Coliseum; Ames, Iowa
February 19, 1975; 7:35 pm		at Oklahoma State	L 70–95	8–14 (2–8)	Gallagher Hall; Stillwater, Oklahoma
February 22, 1975; 2:10 pm, Big Eight		Colorado	W 119–96	9–14 (3–8)	Hilton Coliseum; Ames, Iowa
March 1, 1975; 2:05 pm, Big Eight		at Kansas State	L 68–70	9–15 (3–9)	Ahearn Fieldhouse; Manhattan, Kansas
March 5, 1975; 7:30 pm		at Oklahoma	L 79–84	9–16 (3–10)	OU Field House; Norman, Oklahoma
March 8, 1975; 7:35 pm		Nebraska	W 82–69	10–16 (4–10)	Hilton Coliseum; Ames, Iowa
*Non-conference game. ^{#}Rankings from AP poll. (#) Tournament seedings in parentheses. All times are in Central Time.
