= Ken Trickey =

American basketball coach (1933–2012)

Biographical details
- Born: August 30, 1933; Cape Girardeau, Missouri, U.S.
- Died: December 4, 2012 (aged 79); Tulsa, Oklahoma, U.S.

Coaching career (HC unless noted)

Basketball
- 1965–1969: Middle Tennessee
- 1969–1974: Oral Roberts
- 1974–1976: Iowa State
- 1979–1981: Oklahoma City
- 1987–1993: Oral Roberts

Baseball
- 1963–65: Middle Tennessee

Kenneth Franklin Trickey Sr. (August 30, 1933 – December 4, 2012) was an American basketball and baseball coach, best known for his two stints as the head coach for the men's basketball team at Oral Roberts University (ORU) in Tulsa, Oklahoma. He was especially remembered for ORU's high-scoring "run and gun" teams of the early 1970s, which helped the young, small school attain national attention and competitive success, including a spot in the Elite Eight in the 1974 NCAA Men's Division I Basketball Tournament. After his death in 2012, the Tulsa World called him "one of the most influential and colorful characters in this state’s basketball history".

== Early life ==
Trickey was born in Cape Girardeau, Missouri and grew up in Cairo, Illinois. He graduated from Cairo High School and then attended Middle Tennessee State University, where he became the school's all-time basketball scoring leader. After graduation he spent two years in the Army, then moved into high school coaching at Culver Military Academy, at Tullahoma High School in Tennessee, and at his alma mater, Cairo High School.

== College coaching career ==
=== Middle Tennessee State University ===
Trickey became head coach at Middle Tennessee State in 1965. He was the first MTSU coach to recruit black players, and in 1967 he had the first all-black starting team in Ohio Valley Conference history. He remained at MTSU until 1969. During his tenure, his teams' overall record was 45–54. He was inducted into MTSU's hall of fame in 1991.

=== Oral Roberts University (first stint) ===
Trickey took the head coaching job at ORU in 1969 and made an immediate impact with his high-offense approach. He quickly recruited several top prospects from Tennessee, most notably Richard Fuqua, a prep All-American who became one of the nation's leading scorers at ORU and was named a second team All-American in 1972. With the strong support of school founder Oral Roberts, who saw the basketball program as a way to bring positive attention to his school and his Christian ministry, the team traveled to games around the country, and was widely noted for what Trickey called its "WRAG" ("We Run and Gun") offense. Trickey's teams led the nation in scoring twice, and went to the National Invitational Tournament in 1972 and 1973. In 1974 the team received its first bid to the NCAA tournament; ORU was also the host for that year's Midwest Regional, at the Mabee Center in Tulsa. An upset win over Louisville moved the team into the Elite Eight, needing only one more win on its home floor to move to the Final Four, but ORU lost 93–90 in overtime to Kansas. During his five years, his teams had an overall record of 118–23.

=== Iowa State University ===
Leaving ORU after the 1973–1974 season, Trickey briefly served as an assistant coach under Jim Williams at Colorado State then was hired as the head coach at Iowa State. He did not meet the same level of success he had at ORU. In his two seasons, his teams had an overall record of 13–40.

In 1976 he became the coach at Mount Vernon High School in Mount Vernon, Illinois. In December 1976 he took on the job of reviving the basketball program at Claremore Junior College (now Rogers State University).

=== Oklahoma City University ===
Trickey was the head coach at Oklahoma City University from 1979 to 1981. His teams had an overall record of 27–30, and won the 1981 championship tournament of the Midwestern City League (now the Horizon League). Trickey's tenure was marked by an NCAA investigation of the athletic program, which resulted in sanctions against the school after he left.

Trickey subsequently became head coach and athletic director at Century High School in Ullin, Illinois, near Cairo. Trickey was working as the golf director at a state park resort) when he was hired in 1986 to start a basketball program at Oklahoma Junior College, formerly the Oklahoma School of Accountancy. Among his OJC players was future NBA star John Starks.

=== Oral Roberts University (second stint) ===
In 1987, ORU's founder Oral Roberts hired Trickey to return to the school at a time when the institution was facing both financial difficulty and an investigation for possible rules violations in the sports program. Trickey supervised a move from the NCAA to the NAIA. He coached from 1987 to 1993 and had an overall record of 96–93. ORU elected him to its athletics hall of fame in 2009.

In 2003, Trickey became head coach at Muskogee High School in Muskogee, Oklahoma and coached one season.

== Head coaching record ==
=== College basketball ===
Record table
Season	Team	Overall	Conference	Standing	Postseason
Middle Tennessee Blue Raiders (Ohio Valley Conference) (1965–1969)
1965–66	Middle Tennessee	7–17	3–11	T–6th	
1966–67	Middle Tennessee	10–15	4–10	7th	
1967–68	Middle Tennessee	15–9	7–7	5th	
1968–69	Middle Tennessee	13–13	4–10	7th	
Middle Tennessee:		45–54 (.455)	18–38 (.321)		
Oral Roberts Titans (NAIA Independent) (1969–1971)
1969–70	Oral Roberts	27–4			
1970–71	Oral Roberts	21–5			
Oral Roberts Titans (NCAA Independent) (1971–1974)
1971–72	Oral Roberts	26–2			NIT Quarterfinal
1972–73	Oral Roberts	21–6			First round
1973–74	Oral Roberts	23–6			NCAA Elite Eight
Oral Roberts:		118–23 (.837)			
Iowa State Cyclones (Big Eight Conference) (1974–1976)
1974–75	Iowa State	10–16	4–10	T–7th	
1975–76	Iowa State	3–24	3–11	8th	
Iowa State:		13–40 (.245)	7–21 (.250)		
Oklahoma City Chiefs (Midwestern City Conference) (1979–1981)
1979–80	Oklahoma City	13–15	3–2	3rd	
1980–81	Oklahoma City	14–15	7–4	3rd	
Oklahoma City:		27–30 (.474)	10–6 (.625)		
Oral Roberts Titans (NCAA Independent) (1987–1989)
1987–88	Oral Roberts	8–21			
1988–89	Oral Roberts	8–20			
Oral Roberts Titans (NAIA Independent) (1989–1991)
1989–90	Oral Roberts	36–6			NAIA Elite Eight
1990–91	Oral Roberts	29–6			
Oral Roberts Titans (NCAA Division I Independent) (1991–1993)
1991–92	Oral Roberts	10–18			
1992–93	Oral Roberts	5–22			
Oral Roberts:		96–93 (.508)			
Total:		299–240 (.555)			

=== College baseball ===
Record table
Season	Team	Overall	Conference	Standing	Postseason
Middle Tennessee Blue Raiders (Ohio Valley Conference) (1963–1965)
1963	Middle Tennessee	7–12			
1964	Middle Tennessee	10–8			
1965	Middle Tennessee	9–12			
Middle Tennessee:		26–32 (.448)			
Total:		26–32 (.448)			

== Death ==
Trickey died on December 4, 2012, in Tulsa, at age 79. According to the obituary at his official website, the cause of death was complications of cancer and Alzheimer's disease.
