= C. J. Kupec =

American basketball player (born 1953)

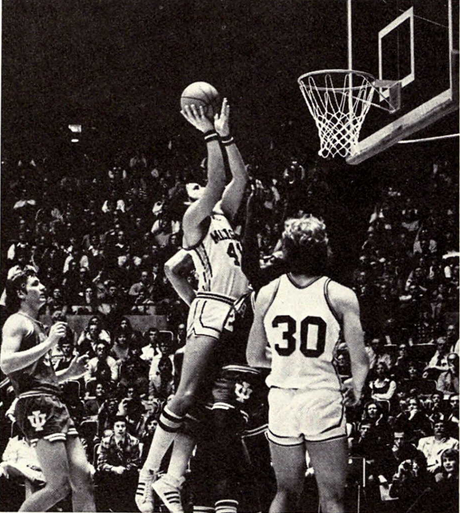
- Kupec from 1975 Michiganensian

Personal information
- Born: January 26, 1953 (age 73) Oak Lawn, Illinois, U.S.
- Listed height: 6 ft 9 in (2.06 m)
- Listed weight: 220 lb (100 kg)

Career information
- High school: Oak Lawn Community (Oak Lawn, Illinois)
- College: Michigan (1972–1975)
- NBA draft: 1975: 4th round, 56th overall pick
- Drafted by: Los Angeles Lakers
- Playing career: 1975–1988
- Position: Center / power forward
- Number: 41, 25

Career history
- 1975–1977: Los Angeles Lakers
- 1977–1978: Houston Rockets
- 1978–1980: Olimpia Billy Milano
- 1981–1982: Squibb Cantù
- 1982–1983: Siv Bergamo
- 1983–1985: Viola Reggio Calabria
- 1985–1986: Mister Day Siena
- 1986–1988: Spondilatte Cremona

Career highlights
- FIBA Intercontinental Cup champion (1982); EuroLeague champion (1982)

Career NBA and LBA statistics
- Points: 6,384 (14.9 ppg)
- Rebounds: 2,101 (4.9 rpg)
- Assists: 453 (1.1 apg)
- Stats at NBA.com
- Stats at Basketball Reference

Charles Jerome "C. J." Kupec (born January 26, 1953) is an American former basketball small forward in the National Basketball Association for the Los Angeles Lakers and Houston Rockets. He also was a member of the Olimpia Billy Milano, Squibb Cantù, SAV Bergamo, Viola Reggio Calabria, Mister Day Siena and Spondilatte Cremona in Europe. He played college basketball for the Michigan Wolverines.

== Early years ==
Kupec attended Oak Lawn Community High School. He was the center of the team at six-foot-six. He also practiced American football.

As a senior in 1971, he contributed to a second-place finish in the final single-class tournament, while receiving Tournament MVP honors. He scored 87 points and pulled down 48 rebounds in four games. He scored 28 points in the super-sectional win against New Trier East High School. He posted 17 rebounds in the semifinal win over Springfield Lanphier High School. In 2007, the Illinois High School Association named Kupec one of the 100 Legends of the IHSA Boys Basketball Tournament.

He averaged 23.2 points per game and set a career OLCHS record with 2,377 total points (before the three point rule).

== College career ==
Kupec accepted a basketball scholarship from the University of Michigan. He also played football.

As a junior, he was named the starter at center, averaging 13.7 points and 11.6 rebounds (led the Big Ten Conference). As a senior, he averaged 18.1 points (third in the Big Ten Conference) and 8.4 rebounds. He also was the first player in school history to serve as the basketball team captain in consecutive years.

== Professional career ==
Kupec was selected by the Los Angeles Lakers in the 4th round (56th overall) of the 1975 NBA draft. He also was selected by the Spirits of St. Louis in the fifth round of the 1975 ABA Draft. He was Kareem Abdul-Jabbar's backup at center for two years. He was waived on September 27, 1977. He averaged 4.2 points, 2.3 rebounds and 9.8 minutes per contest in two seasons.

On September 31, 1977, he was claimed off waivers by the Houston Rockets. He averaged 4 points, 1.9 rebounds and 12.8 minutes in 49 games. On July 26, 1978, he was traded to the Milwaukee Bucks, in exchange for a 1979 4th round draft pick (#76-Sammy Drummer). He was released on September 28, 1978.

In 1978, he signed with the Olimpia Billy Milano of the Lega Basket Serie A in Italy. He was known as having an excellent outside touch, so much so, that his shots from well over 7 meters were called "K bombs", although his personal style placed the ball sideways to the body and not above the head. Together with teammate Mike D'Antoni, he was one of the main leaders of the "rebirth" of the Olimpia Billy Milano team, under the name "Billy", coached by Dan Peterson, that saw its return from bad seasons and relegation to the second-tier league A2. The team was called the "bassotti band" due to the low average height of the team, so much so, that Kupec was the starting center despite his 6–6 feet height.

In 1982, he won the EuroLeague title with the Squibb Cantù. In 1984, he was able to begin fully exploiting his shooting ability with the Viola Reggio Calabria, after the adoption of the three-point shooting rule by the league.

== Career statistics ==
Legend
GP	Games played	GS	Games started	MPG	Minutes per game
FG%	Field goal percentage	3P%	3-point field goal percentage	FT%	Free throw percentage
RPG	Rebounds per game	APG	Assists per game	SPG	Steals per game
BPG	Blocks per game	PPG	Points per game	**Bold**	Career high

=== NBA ===
==== Regular season ====
Year	Team	GP	MPG	FG%	FT%	RPG	APG	SPG	BPG	PPG
1975–76	L.A. Lakers	16	3.4	.250	.636	1.4	.3	**.2**	.0	1.7
1976–77	L.A. Lakers	**82**	11.1	**.447**	.772	**2.4**	.6	**.2**	.0	**4.7**
1977–78	Houston	49	**12.8**	.426	**.818**	1.9	**1.0**	**.2**	**.1**	4.0
Career		147	10.8	.427	.772	2.1	.7	.2	.0	4.1

==== Playoffs ====
Year	Team	GP	MPG	FG%	FT%	RPG	APG	SPG	BPG	PPG
1977	L.A. Lakers	11	5.2	.444	.714	1.5	.4	.3	.0	1.9
