= Iowa–Iowa State rivalry =

American college sports rivalry

- Iowa Hawkeyes Iowa State Cyclones
- Sport: Football, Basketball, Wrestling

Locations of Iowa State and Iowa

The Iowa–Iowa State rivalry is an American college rivalry between the Iowa Hawkeyes sports teams of the University of Iowa and the Iowa State Cyclones sports teams of Iowa State University. The two universities currently compete with each other in the Iowa Corn Cy-Hawk Series, which awards points for athletic victories over the other university. The two schools also compete for the Cy-Hawk Trophy, which is awarded to the winner of the annual football game between the two schools.

Iowa and Iowa State rank as the top two universities in Iowa in terms of enrollment. As of the fall 2024 semester, the University of Iowa, located in Iowa City, had 32,199 students enrolled. Iowa State University, located in Ames, had a fall 2024 enrollment of 30,432. The two schools compete in a wide range of sports, including wrestling, golf, volleyball, soccer, cross country, swimming, and softball, and among major sports such as football and basketball.

== Men's basketball series ==
Iowa–Iowa State men's basketball rivalry
- Iowa Hawkeyes Iowa State Cyclones
- First meeting: February 5, 1909; Iowa 30, Iowa State 27
- Latest meeting: December 11, 2025; Iowa State 66, Iowa 62
- Next meeting: 2026

Statistics
- Total meetings: 79
- All-time series: Iowa leads 48–31
- Largest victory: Iowa, 105-77 (2020)
- Longest win streak: Iowa, 10 (1909–1916)
- Current win streak: Iowa State, 3 (2023—present)

Iowa leads the all-time series 48–31 as of the 2025–26 season.

Iowa victories	Iowa State victories

No.	Date	Location	Winner	Score
1	February 5, 1909	Ames, IA	Iowa	30–27
2	February 26, 1910	Iowa City, IA	Iowa	24–12
3	February 8, 1913	Iowa City	Iowa	27–15
4	February 25, 1913	Ames	Iowa	21–13
5	January 31, 1914	Iowa City	Iowa	22–15
6	February 24, 1914	Ames	Iowa	21–16
7	February 16, 1915	Iowa City	Iowa	27–12
8	March 4, 1915	Ames	Iowa	23–18
9	February 19, 1916	Iowa City	Iowa	26–9
10	March 4, 1916	Ames	Iowa	22–14
11	February 16, 1917	Ames	Iowa State	24–12
12	February 27, 1917	Iowa City	Iowa	15–13
13	February 9, 1918	Iowa City	Iowa	24–9
14	March 1, 1918	Ames	Iowa	22–20
15	February 15, 1919	Iowa City	Iowa	27–17
16	March 1, 1919	Ames	Iowa	29–20
17	January 23, 1920	Iowa City	Iowa	27–15
18	March 6, 1920	Ames	Iowa	26–19
19	February 15, 1921	Iowa City	Iowa State	20–16
20	March 11, 1921	Ames	Iowa State	26–18
21	December 11, 1933	Iowa City	Iowa	30–12
22	January 1, 1935	Ames	Iowa State	41–33
23	December 23, 1970	Iowa City	Iowa	87–68
24	December 18, 1971	Ames	Iowa State	97–94
25	January 2, 1973	Iowa City	Iowa	66–57
26	January 7, 1974	Ames	Iowa State	94–77
27	December 12, 1974	Iowa City	Iowa	77–66
28	December 12, 1975	Ames	Iowa	91–77
29	December 18, 1976	Iowa City	Iowa	85–64
30	November 26, 1977	Ames	Iowa State	79–78
31	December 11, 1978	Iowa City	Iowa	67–66
32	December 15, 1979	Ames	#17 Iowa	67–64
33	December 20, 1980	Iowa City	#16 Iowa	85–59
34	December 8, 1981	Ames	#6 Iowa	79–68
35	January 15, 1983	Iowa City	#12 Iowa	73–56
36	January 14, 1984	Ames	Iowa State	76–72^{2OT}
37	December 4, 1984	Iowa City	Iowa State	54–50
38	December 10, 1985	Ames	Iowa State	74–61
39	December 20, 1986	Iowa City	#3 Iowa	89–64
40	December 19, 1987	Ames	#20 Iowa State	102–100^{OT}

No.	Date	Location	Winner	Score
41	December 10, 1988	Iowa City	#5 Iowa	91–71
42	December 7, 1989	Ames	Iowa	89–87
43	December 8, 1990	Iowa City	Iowa	75–73
44	December 14, 1991	Ames	Iowa State	98–84
45	December 12, 1992	Iowa City	#8 Iowa	78–51
46	December 11, 1993	Ames	Iowa State	86–79
47	December 10, 1994	Iowa City	Iowa State	76–63
48	December 9, 1995	Ames	#12 Iowa	56–50
49	December 14, 1996	Iowa City	#6 Iowa State	81–74
50	December 13, 1997	Ames	#10 Iowa	60–59
51	December 12, 1998	Iowa City	Iowa	74–54
52	December 11, 1999	Ames	Iowa State	79–66
53	December 9, 2000	Iowa City	Iowa	80–68
54	December 8, 2001	Ames	#12 Iowa	78–53
55	December 13, 2002	Iowa City	Iowa State	73–69
56	March 21, 2003	Ames	Iowa	54–53
57	January 21, 2004	Ames	Iowa State	84–76
58	December 10, 2004	Iowa City	#17 Iowa	70–63
59	December 9, 2005	Ames	Iowa State	72–60
60	December 8, 2006	Iowa City	Iowa	77–59
61	December 8, 2007	Ames	Iowa State	56–47
62	December 12, 2008	Iowa City	Iowa	73–57
63	December 11, 2009	Ames	Iowa State	81–71
64	December 10, 2010	Iowa City	Iowa State	75–72
65	December 9, 2011	Ames	Iowa State	86–76
66	December 7, 2012	Iowa City	Iowa	80–71
67	December 13, 2013	Ames	#17 Iowa State	85–82
68	December 12, 2014	Iowa City	#14 Iowa State	90–75
69	December 10, 2015	Ames	#4 Iowa State	83–82
70	December 8, 2016	Iowa City	Iowa	78–64
71	December 7, 2017	Ames	Iowa State	84–78
72	December 6, 2018	Iowa City	#18 Iowa	98–84
73	December 12, 2019	Ames	Iowa	84–68
74	December 11, 2020	Iowa City	#3 Iowa	105–77
75	December 9, 2021	Ames	#17 Iowa State	73–53
76	December 8, 2022	Iowa City	Iowa	75–56
77	December 7, 2023	Ames	Iowa State	90–65
78	December 12, 2024	Iowa City	#3 Iowa State	89–80
79	December 11, 2025	Ames	#4 Iowa State	66–62
Series: Iowa leads 48–31

== Wrestling ==
Iowa victories	Iowa State victories

No.	Date	Location	Winner	Score
1	March, 4 1916	Iowa City, IA	Iowa	17–8
2	February 9, 1917	Ames, IA	Iowa State	33–7
3	February 8, 1919	Ames	Iowa State	26–14
4	February 21, 1920	Ames	Iowa State	31–6
5	February 17, 1933	Ames	Iowa State	34–0
6	March, 6 1934	Iowa City	Iowa State	19.5–12.5
7	February, 27 1935	Ames	Iowa State	15.5–10.5
8	March 2, 1936	Iowa City	Iowa	15–13
9	February 22, 1937	Ames	Iowa State	24.5–7.5
10	February 5, 1938	Iowa City	Iowa State	19–11
11	January 13, 1973	Iowa City	Iowa State	29–9
12	February 16, 1974	Ames	Iowa	23–12
13	January 3, 1975	Iowa City	Tie	19–19
14	January 9, 1976	Ames	Iowa	19–14
15	February 21, 1976	Iowa City	Iowa	27–12
16	January 7, 1977	Iowa City	Iowa State	17–15
17	February 19, 1977	Ames	Tie	17–17
18	January 7, 1978	Ames	Iowa State	18–16
19	February 18, 1978	Iowa City	Iowa	24–13
20	January 6. 1979	Iowa City	Iowa	24–14
21	February 17, 1979	Ames	Iowa	29–19
22	January 5, 1980	Ames	Iowa	23–17
23	February 16, 1980	Iowa City	Iowa	22–12
24	January 9, 1981	Ames	Iowa State	25–14
25	February 12, 1981	Iowa City	Iowa	27–5
26	January 9, 1982	Iowa City	Iowa	24–11
27	February 19, 1982	Ames	Iowa	31–8
28	January 15, 1983	Ames	Iowa	21–15
29	February 19, 1983	Iowa City	Iowa	26–11
30	January 14, 1984	Iowa City	Iowa	27–14
31	February 18, 1984	Ames	Iowa	26–16
32	January 19, 1985	Ames	Iowa	28–9
33	February 23, 1985	Iowa City	Iowa	23–9
34	January 18, 1986	Iowa City	Iowa	25–9
35	February 23, 1986	Iowa City	Iowa State	19–16
36	January 11, 1987	Ames	Iowa State	23–12
37	February 21, 1987	Iowa City	Iowa	18–15
38	January 16, 1988	Iowa City	Iowa	22–15
39	February 21, 1988	Ames	Iowa	17–15
40	January 15, 1989	Ames	Iowa	25–15
41	February 19, 1989	Iowa City	Iowa	22–17
42	January 12, 1990	Hampton, VA	Iowa	32–2
43	January 13, 1990	Hampton	Iowa	24–13
44	January 20, 1990	Iowa City	Iowa	28–6
45	February 18, 1990	Ames	Iowa	29–8

No.	Date	Location	Winner	Score
46	January 20, 1991	Ames	Iowa	25–9
47	February 17, 1991	Iowa City	Iowa	37–6
48	February 9, 1992	Ann Arbor, MI	Iowa	32–13
49	February 22, 1992	Iowa City	Iowa	29–8
50	February 20, 1993	Ames	Iowa	28–12
51	February 20, 1994	Iowa City	Iowa	22–19
52	February 18, 1995	Ames	Iowa	32–3
53	January 13, 1996	Ames	Iowa	22–12
54	February 18, 1996	Iowa City	Iowa	33–4
55	December 14, 1996	Iowa City	Iowa	26–13
56	February 16, 1997	Ames	Iowa	20–18
57	December 14, 1997	Ames	Iowa	28–10
58	February 20, 1998	Iowa City	Iowa	32–9
59	December 11, 1998	Iowa City	Iowa	30–14
60	January 17, 1999	Iowa City	Iowa	32–7
61	December 10, 1999	Ames	Iowa	24–12
62	December 8, 2000	Iowa City	Iowa	23–17
63	January 21, 2001	State College, PA	Iowa	26–21
64	December 9, 2001	Ames	Iowa	21–16
65	January 20, 2002	Columbus, OH	Iowa	25–15
66	December 8, 2002	Iowa City	Iowa	34–7
67	December 7, 2003	Ames	Iowa State	21–13
68	December 5, 2004	Iowa City	Iowa State	19–16
69	December 2, 2005	Ames	Iowa	20–15
70	December 3, 2006	Iowa City	Iowa	24–6
71	December 9, 2007	Ames	Iowa	20–13
72	December 6, 2008	Iowa City	Iowa	20–15
73	December 6, 2009	Ames	Iowa	18–16
74	January 10, 2010	Cedar Falls, IA	Iowa	19–12
75	December 3, 2010	Iowa City	Iowa	22–13
76	December 4, 2011	Ames	Iowa	27–9
77	December 1, 2012	Iowa City	Iowa	32–3
78	December 1, 2013	Ames	Iowa	23–9
79	November 29, 2014	Iowa City	Iowa	28–8
80	November 29, 2015	Ames	Iowa	33–6
81	December 10, 2016	Iowa City	Iowa	26–9
82	February 18, 2018	Ames	Iowa	35–6
83	December 1, 2018	Iowa City	Iowa	19–18
84	November 24, 2019	Ames	Iowa	29–6
85	December 5, 2021	Ames	Iowa	22–11
86	December 4, 2022	Iowa City	Iowa	18–15
87	November 26, 2023	Ames	Iowa	18–14
88	November 23, 2024	Iowa City	Iowa	21–15
89	November 30, 2025	Ames	Iowa State	20–14
Series: Iowa leads 70–17–2

== Women's basketball ==
Iowa victories	Iowa State victories

No.	Date	Location	Winner	Score
1	December 5, 1975	Ames, IA	Iowa State	92–63
2	February 6, 1977	Ames, IA	Iowa State	71–58
3	February 18, 1977	Iowa City, IA	Iowa State	82–63
4	December 3, 1977	Iowa City, IA	Iowa State	74–71^{OT}
5	February 23, 1978	Des Moines, IA	Iowa	77–60
6	February 25, 1978	Des Moines, IA	Iowa State	87–82
7	December 4, 1978	Ames, IA	Iowa	89–70
8	February 14, 1979	Iowa City, IA	Iowa	81–70
9	February 22, 1979	Des Moines, IA	Iowa	68–67
10	December 15, 1979	Ames, IA	Iowa State	80–69
11	January 29, 1980	Iowa City, IA	Iowa	66–50
12	December 2, 1980	Iowa City, IA	Iowa	67–66
13	January 21, 1981	Ames, IA	Iowa	66–62
14	December 2, 1981	Ames, IA	Iowa State	82–59
15	January 21, 1982	Iowa City, IA	Iowa	62–44
16	March 11, 1982	Warrensburg, MO	Iowa State	64–52
17	November 23, 1982	Iowa City, IA	Iowa	64–59
18	December 5, 1983	Ames, IA	Iowa	86–75^{OT}
19	December 15, 1984	Iowa City, IA	Iowa	81–41
20	December 4, 1985	Ames, IA	#15 Iowa	63–57
21	December 10, 1986	Iowa City, IA	#17 Iowa	70–51
22	December 1, 1987	Ames, IA	#6 Iowa	93–49
23	December 7, 1988	Iowa City, IA	#11 Iowa	79–46
24	December 17, 1989	Ames, IA	#5 Iowa	75–55
25	November 27, 1991	Iowa City, IA	#11 Iowa	70–58
26	December 1, 1996	Iowa City, IA	#10 Iowa	64–53
27	December 13, 1997	Ames, IA	Iowa State	74–57

No.	Date	Location	Winner	Score
28	November 17, 1998	Iowa City, IA	#21 Iowa State	81–65
29	December 11, 1999	Ames, IA	#9 Iowa State	79–69
30	November 22, 2000	Iowa City, IA	#8 Iowa State	86–76
31	December 12, 2001	Ames, IA	#5 Iowa State	82–64
32	December 4, 2002	Iowa City, IA	Iowa	64–39
33	December 3, 2003	Ames, IA	Iowa State	101–94
34	December 1, 2004	Iowa City, IA	Iowa	89–80
35	December 8, 2005	Ames, IA	Iowa State	77–61
36	November 30, 2006	Iowa City, IA	Iowa State	80–74
37	December 7, 2011	Ames, IA	Iowa State	62–54
38	December 6, 2012	Iowa City, IA	Iowa	50–42
39	December 12, 2013	Ames, IA	#17 Iowa State	83–70
40	December 11, 2014	Iowa City, IA	#24 Iowa	76–67
41	December 11, 2015	Ames, IA	Iowa State	69–66
42	December 7, 2016	Iowa City, IA	Iowa	88–76
43	December 6, 2017	Ames, IA	Iowa	61–55
44	December 5, 2018	Iowa City, IA	#16 Iowa	73–70
45	December 11, 2019	Ames, IA	Iowa	75–69
46	December 9, 2020	Iowa City, IA	Iowa	82–80
47	December 8, 2021	Ames, IA	#15 Iowa State	77–70
48	December 7, 2022	Iowa City, IA	#16 Iowa	70–57
49	December 6, 2023	Ames, IA	#4 Iowa	67–58
50	December 11, 2024	Iowa City, IA	#21 Iowa	75–69
51	December 10, 2025	Ames, IA	#10 Iowa State	74–69
52	December 9, 2026	Iowa City, IA		
Series: Iowa leads 30–21
