= 1972–73 NCAA University Division men's basketball season =

Men's collegiate basketball season

- Preseason AP No. 1: UCLA
- NCAA Tournament: 1973
- Tournament dates: March 10 – 26, 1973
- National Championship: St. Louis Arena; St. Louis, Missouri
- NCAA Champions: UCLA
- Helms National Champions: UCLA
- Other champions: Virginia Tech (NIT)
- Player of the Year (Naismith, Wooden): Bill Walton, UCLA (Naismith)
- Player of the Year (Helms): Bill Walton, UCLA

The 1972–73 NCAA University Division men's basketball season began in November 1972, progressed through the regular season and conference tournaments, and concluded with the 1973 NCAA University Division basketball tournament championship game on March 26, 1973, at St. Louis Arena in St. Louis, Missouri. The UCLA Bruins won their ninth NCAA national championship with an 87–66 victory over the Memphis State Tigers.

== Rule changes ==
- Freshmen became eligible to play on varsity teams. Previously, they had played on separate freshman teams.
- The free throw on a common foul for the first six personal fouls in a half was eliminated. Instead, the team that was fouled threw the ball in from out of bounds after each such foul.
- A "flop" — an unnecessary fall to the floor to get a charging call against a player dribbling the ball — was deemed a form of unsportsmanlike conduct.

== Season headlines ==
- UCLA went undefeated (30–0) for the second straight season and won its seventh NCAA championship in a row, ninth overall, and ninth in 10 seasons. In the Pacific 8 Conference, it also won its seventh of what would ultimately be 13 consecutive conference titles.
- This was the last season for the NCAA University Division as the subdivision of the NCAA made up of colleges and universities competing at the highest level of college sports, as well as for the NCAA College Division for colleges and universities competing at a lower level. After the season, the NCAA replaced the University Division with Division I and the College Division with Division II for schools awarding limited athletic scholarships and Division III for schools offering no athletic scholarships.
- The Final Four was played on Saturday and Monday for the first time.
- The NCAA title game was televised during prime time for the first time. NBC aired the game on March 26, 1973.
- For the first time, television broadcast rights fees for an NCAA tournament totaled more than $1 million.

== Season outlook ==
=== Pre-season polls ===
The Top 20 from the AP Poll and Coaches Poll during the pre-season.

Associated Press
Ranking	Team
1	UCLA
2	Florida State
3	Maryland
4	Minnesota
5	Marquette
6	Long Beach State
7	Southwestern Louisiana
8	NC State
9	Penn
10	Ohio State
11	Memphis State
12	BYU
13	Kentucky
14	Tennessee
15	Houston
16	South Carolina
17	Kansas State
18	Oral Roberts
19	Michigan
20 (tie)	Louisville
20 (tie)	USC

UPI Coaches
Ranking	Team
1	UCLA
2	Florida State
3	Maryland
4	Minnesota
5	Marquette
6	Ohio State
7	Kentucky
8	Long Beach State
9	Penn
10	NC State
11	Houston
12	North Carolina
13	Southwestern Louisiana
14	Memphis State
15 (tie)	BYU
15 (tie)	Kansas State
17	USC
18	Providence
19	Oral Roberts
20	UTEP

== Conference membership changes ==
School	Former conference	New conference
Appalachian State Mountaineers	non-University Division	Southern Conference
Boston University Terriers	University Division independent	Yankee Conference
Central Michigan Chippewas	non-University Division	Mid-American Conference
Charlotte 49ers	non-University Division	University Division independent
Cleveland State Vikings	non-University Division	University Division independent
Loyola (LA) Wolf Pack	University Division independent	None (dropped athletics)
McNeese State Cowboys	non-University Division	Southland Conference
Northeastern Huskies	non-University Division	University Division independent
Portland State Vikings	non-University Division	University Division independent
Samford Bulldogs	non-University Division	University Division independent
Southern Miss Golden Eagles	non-University Division	University Division independent
Trinity Tigers	Southland Conference	University Division independent

== Regular season ==
=== Conferences ===
==== Conference winners and tournaments ====
Conference	Regular season winner	Conference player of the year	Conference tournament	Tournament venue (City)	Tournament winner
Atlantic Coast Conference	NC State	David Thompson, NC State	1973 ACC men's basketball tournament	Greensboro Coliseum (Greensboro, North Carolina)	NC State
Big Eight Conference	Kansas State	Lon Kruger, Kansas State	No Tournament		
Big Sky Conference	Weber State	None selected	No Tournament		
Big Ten Conference	Indiana	None selected	No Tournament		
Ivy League	Penn	None selected	No Tournament		
Mid-American Conference	Ohio	Tom Kozelko, Toledo	No Tournament		
Middle Atlantic Conference	Saint Joseph's (East); Lafayette (West)	Patrick McFarland, Saint Joseph's & Walt Kocubinski, Lafayette	No Tournament		
Missouri Valley Conference	Memphis State	Larry Kenon, Memphis State	No Tournament		
Ohio Valley Conference	Austin Peay State	Les Taylor, Murray State	No Tournament		
Pacific 8 Conference	UCLA	None selected	No Tournament		
Pacific Coast Athletic Association	Long Beach State	Ed Ratleff, Long Beach State	No Tournament		
Southeastern Conference	Kentucky	Kevin Grevey, Kentucky, & Wendell Hudson, Alabama	No Tournament		
Southern Conference	Davidson	Aron Stewart, Richmond	1973 Southern Conference men's basketball tournament	Richmond Coliseum (Richmond, Virginia) (Semifinals and Finals)	Furman
Southland Conference	Louisiana Tech	Mike Green, Louisiana Tech	No Tournament		
Southwest Conference	Texas Tech	Martin Terry, Arkansas	No Tournament		
West Coast Athletic Conference	San Francisco	Bird Averitt, Pepperdine	No Tournament		
Western Athletic Conference	Arizona State	None selected	No Tournament		
Yankee Conference	Massachusetts	None selected	No Tournament		

==== Conference standings ====
1972–73 ACC men's basketball standings
	Conf.				Overall
Team	W		L	PCT	W		L	PCT
No. 2 NC State †	12	–	0	1.000	27	–	0	1.000
No. 11 North Carolina	8	–	4	.667	25	–	8	.758
No. 8 Maryland	7	–	5	.583	23	–	7	.767
Duke	4	–	8	.333	12	–	14	.462
Virginia	4	–	8	.333	13	–	12	.520
Clemson	4	–	8	.333	12	–	14	.462
Wake Forest	3	–	9	.250	12	–	15	.444
† 1973 ACC tournament winner Rankings from AP Poll

1972–73 Big Eight Conference men's basketball standings
	Conf.				Overall
Team	W		L	PCT	W		L	PCT
No. 9 Kansas State	12	–	2	.857	23	–	5	.821
No. 15 Missouri	9	–	5	.643	21	–	6	.778
Colorado	9	–	5	.643	13	–	13	.500
Oklahoma	8	–	6	.571	18	–	8	.692
Iowa State	7	–	7	.500	16	–	10	.615
Nebraska	7	–	7	.500	9	–	17	.346
Kansas	4	–	10	.286	8	–	18	.308
Oklahoma State	3	–	11	.214	7	–	19	.269
Rankings from AP Poll

1972–73 Big Sky men's basketball standings
	Conf.				Overall
Team	W		L	PCT	W		L	PCT
Weber State	13	–	1	.929	20	–	7	.741
Idaho State	10	–	4	.714	18	–	8	.692
Montana State	9	–	5	.643	17	–	10	.630
Montana	7	–	7	.500	13	–	13	.500
Gonzaga	6	–	8	.429	14	–	12	.538
Boise State	5	–	9	.357	11	–	15	.423
Idaho	3	–	11	.214	7	–	19	.269
Northern Arizona	3	–	11	.214	6	–	20	.231

1972–73 Big Ten Conference men's basketball standings
	Conf.				Overall
Team	W		L	PCT	W		L	PCT
No. 6 Indiana	11	–	3	.786	22	–	6	.786
No. 10 Minnesota	10	–	4	.714	21	–	5	.808
Purdue	8	–	6	.571	15	–	9	.625
Illinois	8	–	6	.571	14	–	10	.583
Ohio State	8	–	6	.571	14	–	10	.583
Iowa	6	–	8	.429	13	–	11	.542
Michigan	6	–	8	.429	13	–	11	.542
Michigan State	6	–	8	.429	13	–	11	.542
Wisconsin	5	–	9	.357	11	–	13	.458
Northwestern	2	–	12	.143	5	–	19	.208
Rankings from AP Poll

1972–73 Ivy League men's basketball standings
	Conf.				Overall
Team	W		L	PCT	W		L	PCT
No. 18 Pennsylvania	12	–	2	.857	21	–	7	.750
Princeton	11	–	3	.786	16	–	9	.640
Brown	10	–	4	.714	14	–	12	.538
Harvard	7	–	7	.500	14	–	12	.538
Yale	6	–	8	.429	9	–	16	.360
Columbia	5	–	9	.357	7	–	18	.280
Dartmouth	4	–	10	.286	6	–	20	.231
Cornell	1	–	13	.071	4	–	22	.154
Rankings from AP Poll

1972–73 Mid-American Conference men's basketball standings
	Conf.				Overall
Team	W		L	PCT	W		L	PCT
Miami (Ohio)	9	–	2	.818	18	–	9	.667
Toledo	7	–	5	.583	15	–	11	.577
Bowling Green State	7	–	5	.583	13	–	13	.500
Ohio	6	–	5	.545	16	–	10	.615
Kent State	5	–	7	.417	10	–	16	.385
Central Michigan	4	–	6	.400	13	–	13	.500
Western Michigan	2	–	10	.167	8	–	18	.308
Rankings from AP Poll

1972–73 MAC men's basketball standings
	Conf.				Overall
Team	W		L	PCT	W		L	PCT
University–Eastern
Saint Joseph's †	6	–	0	1.000	22	–	6	.786
Temple	5	–	1	.833	17	–	10	.630
American	4	–	2	.667	21	–	4	.840
La Salle	3	–	3	.500	15	–	10	.600
Drexel	2	–	4	.333	14	–	7	.667
Hofstra	1	–	5	.167	8	–	16	.333
West Chester	0	–	6	.000	5	–	21	.192
University–Western
Lafayette	7	–	3	.700	16	–	10	.615
Gettysburg	6	–	4	.600	14	–	11	.560
Delaware	6	–	4	.600	14	–	11	.560
Bucknell	6	–	4	.600	11	–	14	.440
Lehigh	3	–	7	.300	8	–	17	.320
Rider	2	–	8	.200	12	–	14	.462
† 1973 MAC men's basketball tournament winner Rankings from AP Poll

1972–73 Missouri Valley Conference men's basketball standings
	Conf.				Overall
Team	W		L	PCT	W		L	PCT
No. 12 Memphis State	12	–	2	.857	24	–	6	.800
Louisville	11	–	3	.786	23	–	7	.767
Saint Louis	10	–	4	.714	19	–	7	.731
Tulsa	10	–	4	.714	18	–	8	.692
New Mexico State	6	–	8	.429	12	–	14	.462
Wichita State	6	–	8	.429	10	–	16	.385
Drake	5	–	9	.357	14	–	12	.538
Bradley	4	–	10	.286	12	–	14	.462
North Texas State	4	–	10	.286	9	–	16	.360
West Texas State	2	–	12	.143	9	–	17	.346
Rankings from AP Poll

1972–73 Ohio Valley Conference men's basketball standings
	Conf.				Overall
Team	W		L	PCT	W		L	PCT
No. 19 Austin Peay State*	11	–	3	.786	22	–	7	.759
Murray State	9	–	5	.643	17	–	8	.680
Morehead State	9	–	5	.643	14	–	11	.560
Tennessee Tech	7	–	7	.500	14	–	11	.560
Eastern Kentucky	7	–	7	.500	12	–	13	.480
Western Kentucky	6	–	8	.429	10	–	16	.385
Middle Tennessee	5	–	9	.357	12	–	13	.480
East Tennessee State	2	–	12	.143	9	–	17	.346
* – Overall record adjusted to 21–5; Rankings from AP Poll

1972–73 Pacific-8 Conference men's basketball standings
	Conf.				Overall
Team	W		L	PCT	W		L	PCT
No. 1 UCLA	14	–	0	1.000	30	–	0	1.000
USC	9	–	5	.643	18	–	10	.643
Oregon	8	–	6	.571	16	–	10	.615
Stanford	7	–	7	.500	14	–	11	.560
Washington	6	–	8	.429	16	–	11	.593
Oregon State	6	–	8	.429	15	–	11	.577
California	4	–	10	.286	11	–	15	.423
Washington State	2	–	12	.143	6	–	20	.231
Rankings from AP Poll

1972–73 Pacific Coast Athletic Association men's basketball standings
	Conf.				Overall
Team	W		L	PCT	W		L	PCT
No. 3 Long Beach State*	10	–	2	.833	26	–	3	.897
UC Santa Barbara	8	–	4	.667	17	–	9	.654
San Diego State	7	–	5	.583	15	–	11	.577
Pacific	6	–	6	.500	14	–	12	.538
San Jose State	6	–	6	.500	11	–	14	.440
Cal State Los Angeles	4	–	8	.333	11	–	14	.440
Fresno State	1	–	11	.083	10	–	16	.385
* – Overall record adjusted to 24–2; Rankings from AP Poll

1972–73 Southeastern Conference men's basketball standings
	Conf.				Overall
Team	W		L	PCT	W		L	PCT
No. 17 Kentucky	14	–	4	.778	20	–	8	.714
Vanderbilt	13	–	5	.722	20	–	6	.769
Alabama	13	–	5	.722	22	–	8	.733
Tennessee	13	–	5	.722	15	–	9	.625
LSU	9	–	9	.500	14	–	10	.583
Ole Miss	8	–	10	.444	14	–	12	.538
Florida	7	–	11	.389	11	–	15	.423
Georgia	5	–	13	.278	10	–	16	.385
Mississippi State	4	–	14	.222	11	–	15	.423
Auburn	4	–	14	.222	6	–	20	.231
Rankings from AP Poll

1972–73 Southern Conference men's basketball standings
	Conf.				Overall
Team	W		L	PCT	W		L	PCT
Davidson	9	–	1	.900	18	–	9	.667
Furman †	11	–	2	.846	20	–	9	.690
East Carolina	7	–	7	.500	13	–	13	.500
The Citadel	6	–	7	.462	11	–	15	.423
William & Mary	5	–	6	.455	10	–	17	.370
Richmond	5	–	9	.357	8	–	16	.333
Appalachian State	3	–	8	.273	6	–	20	.231
VMI	3	–	9	.250	6	–	20	.231
† Southern Conference Tournament winner Rankings from AP Poll

1972–73 Southland Conference men's basketball standings
	Conf.				Overall
Team	W		L	PCT	W		L	PCT
Louisiana Tech†*	10	–	2	.833	20	–	6	.769
McNeese State**	10	–	2	.833	21	–	5	.808
Texas-Arlington***	8	–	4	.667	13	–	13	.500
Lamar****	6	–	6	.500	11	–	13	.458
Arkansas State*****	4	–	8	.333	7	–	17	.292
Abilene Christian******	4	–	8	.333	6	–	20	.231
No. 7 Southwestern Louisiana*******	0	–	12	.000	23	–	3	.885
† Regular-season championship winner * – Played as non-major program; conference record adjusted to 10–2. ** – Played as non-major program; conference record adjusted to 10–2. *** – Disputed conference record 6–6. **** – Disputed conference record 4–8. ***** – Disputed conference record 2–10. ****** – Disputed conference record 2–10. ******* – Disputed record 12–0 conference, 24–5 overall. Rankings from AP Poll

1972–73 Southwest Conference men's basketball standings
	Conf.				Overall
Team	W		L	PCT	W		L	PCT
Texas Tech	12	–	2	.857	19	–	8	.704
Texas A&M	9	–	5	.643	17	–	9	.654
Arkansas	9	–	5	.643	16	–	10	.615
Baylor	8	–	6	.571	14	–	11	.560
Texas	7	–	7	.500	13	–	12	.520
SMU	7	–	7	.500	10	–	15	.400
Rice	2	–	12	.143	7	–	19	.269
TCU	2	–	12	.143	4	–	21	.160
Rankings from AP Poll

1972–73 West Coast Athletic Conference men's basketball standings
	Conf.				Overall
Team	W		L	PCT	W		L	PCT
No. 20 San Francisco	12	–	2	.857	23	–	5	.821
Santa Clara	11	–	3	.786	19	–	7	.731
Pepperdine	7	–	7	.500	14	–	11	.560
Loyola (Calif.)	7	–	7	.500	10	–	16	.385
Seattle	6	–	8	.429	13	–	13	.500
UNLV	6	–	8	.429	13	–	15	.464
Nevada	5	–	9	.357	10	–	16	.385
Saint Mary's	2	–	12	.143	7	–	19	.269
Rankings from AP Poll

1972–73 WAC men's basketball standings
	Conf.				Overall
Team	W		L	PCT	W		L	PCT
No. 16 Arizona State	10	–	4	.714	19	–	9	.679
New Mexico	9	–	5	.643	21	–	6	.778
BYU	9	–	5	.643	19	–	7	.731
Arizona	9	–	5	.643	16	–	10	.615
UTEP	6	–	8	.429	16	–	10	.615
Colorado State	5	–	9	.357	13	–	15	.464
Wyoming	4	–	10	.286	9	–	17	.346
Utah	4	–	10	.286	8	–	19	.296
Rankings from AP Poll

1972–73 Yankee Conference men's basketball standings
	Conf.				Overall
Team	W		L	PCT	W		L	PCT
Massachusetts	10	–	2	.833	20	–	7	.741
Connecticut	9	–	3	.750	15	–	10	.600
Boston University	7	–	4	.636	15	–	10	.600
Maine	6	–	6	.500	13	–	10	.565
Rhode Island	5	–	6	.455	7	–	18	.280
New Hampshire	2	–	10	.167	11	–	15	.423
Vermont	2	–	10	.167	7	–	17	.292

=== University Division independents ===
A total of 72 college teams played as University Division independents. Among them, Providence (27–4) and Marquette (27–4) had both the best winning percentage (.871) and the most wins.

1972–73 NCAA University Division men's basketball independents standings
	Conf.				Overall
Team	W		L	PCT	W		L	PCT
No. 4 Providence		–		–	27	–	4	.871
No. 5 Marquette		–		–	27	–	4	.871
No. 13 Houston		–		–	23	–	4	.852
No. 14 Syracuse		–		–	24	–	5	.828
Virginia Tech		–		–	22	–	5	.815
Jacksonville		–		–	21	–	6	.778
Oklahoma City		–		–	21	–	6	.778
Oral Roberts		–		–	21	–	6	.778
South Carolina		–		–	22	–	7	.759
Marshall		–		–	20	–	7	.741
Northeastern		–		–	19	–	7	.731
St. John's		–		–	19	–	7	.731
Centenary		–		–	19	–	8	.704
Florida State		–		–	18	–	8	.692
Northern Illinois		–		–	17	–	8	.680
Duquesne		–		–	16	–	8	.667
Fairfield		–		–	18	–	9	.667
Cincinnati		–		–	17	–	9	.654
Denver		–		–	17	–	9	.654
George Washington		–		–	17	–	9	.654
Penn State		–		–	15	–	8	.652
Detroit		–		–	16	–	9	.640
Hardin–Simmons		–		–	16	–	9	.640
Indiana State		–		–	16	–	10	.615
Manhattan		–		–	16	–	10	.615
Utah State		–		–	16	–	10	.615
Notre Dame		–		–	18	–	12	.600
Air Force		–		–	14	–	10	.583
Creighton		–		–	15	–	11	.577
Hawaii		–		–	15	–	11	.577
Rutgers		–		–	15	–	11	.577
Stetson		–		–	15	–	11	.577
DePaul		–		–	14	–	11	.560
South Alabama		–		–	14	–	11	.560
Trinity (TX)		–		–	14	–	11	.560
Canisius		–		–	13	–	11	.542
Butler		–		–	14	–	12	.538
Charlotte		–		–	14	–	12	.538
Illinois State		–		–	13	–	12	.520
Long Island		–		–	13	–	12	.520
Navy		–		–	13	–	12	.520
Dayton		–		–	13	–	13	.500
Fairleigh Dickinson		–		–	13	–	13	.500
St. Bonaventure		–		–	13	–	13	.500
Portland State		–		–	12	–	12	.500
Georgetown		–		–	12	–	14	.462
Pittsburgh		–		–	12	–	14	.462
Tulane		–		–	12	–	14	.462
Army		–		–	11	–	13	.458
Boston College		–		–	11	–	14	.440
Colgate		–		–	11	–	14	.440
Villanova		–		–	11	–	14	.440
Fordham		–		–	12	–	16	.429
Southern Illinois		–		–	11	–	15	.423
West Virginia		–		–	10	–	15	.400
Cleveland State		–		–	9	–	14	.391
Ball State		–		–	9	–	15	.375
Niagara		–		–	9	–	16	.360
Loyola (IL)		–		–	8	–	15	.348
Holy Cross		–		–	9	–	17	.346
Southern Miss		–		–	8	–	16	.333
St. Francis (NY)		–		–	8	–	16	.333
Portland		–		–	9	–	19	.321
Seton Hall		–		–	8	–	17	.320
Georgia Southern		–		–	8	–	18	.308
Saint Peter's		–		–	8	–	18	.308
Georgia Tech		–		–	7	–	18	.280
Iona		–		–	6	–	16	.273
Samford		–		–	5	–	20	.200
Saint Francis (PA)		–		–	5	–	21	.192
Pan American		–		–	4	–	22	.154
Xavier		–		–	3	–	23	.115
Rankings from AP Poll

=== Informal championships ===
Conference	Regular season winner	Most Valuable Player
Philadelphia Big 5	Penn	Tom Ingelsby, Villanova

Penn finished with a 4–0 record in head-to-head competition among the Philadelphia Big 5.

== Post-season tournaments ==
=== NCAA tournament ===
==== Final Four ====
National semifinals
E	Providence	85
MW	Memphis State	98
ME	Indiana	59
W	UCLA	70

National finals
MW	Memphis State	66
W	UCLA	87
Third place
E	Providence	79
ME	Indiana	97

=== National Invitation tournament ===
==== Semifinals & finals ====
Semifinals
North Carolina	71
Notre Dame	78
Virginia Tech	74
Alabama	73

Finals
Notre Dame	91
Virginia Tech	92
Third place
North Carolina	88
Alabama	69

== Awards ==
=== Consensus All-American teams ===
Consensus First Team
Player	Position	Class	Team
Doug Collins	G	Senior	Illinois State
Ernie DiGregorio	G	Senior	Providence
Dwight Lamar	G	Senior	Southwestern Louisiana
Ed Ratleff	F	Senior	Long Beach State
David Thompson	G/F	Sophomore	North Carolina State
Bill Walton	C	Junior	UCLA
Keith Wilkes	G/F	Junior	UCLA

Consensus Second Team
Player	Position	Class	Team
Jim Brewer	F/C	Senior	Minnesota
Tom Burleson	C	Junior	North Carolina State
Larry Finch	G	Senior	Memphis State
Kevin Joyce	G	Senior	South Carolina
Tom McMillen	F	Junior	Maryland
Kermit Washington	C	Senior	American

=== Major player of the year awards ===
- Naismith Award: Bill Walton, UCLA
- Helms Player of the Year: Bill Walton, UCLA
- Associated Press Player of the Year: Bill Walton, UCLA
- UPI Player of the Year: Bill Walton, UCLA
- Oscar Robertson Trophy (USBWA): Bill Walton, UCLA
- Adolph Rupp Trophy: Bill Walton, UCLA
- Sporting News Player of the Year: Bill Walton, UCLA

=== Major coach of the year awards ===
- Associated Press Coach of the Year: John Wooden, UCLA
- Henry Iba Award (USBWA): John Wooden, UCLA
- NABC Coach of the Year: Gene Bartow, Memphis State
- UPI Coach of the Year: John Wooden, UCLA
- Sporting News Coach of the Year: John Wooden, UCLA

=== Other major awards ===
- Frances Pomeroy Naismith Award (Best player under 6'0): Robert Sherwin, Army
- Robert V. Geasey Trophy (Top player in Philadelphia Big 5): Tom Ingelsby, Villanova
- NIT/Haggerty Award (Top player in New York City metro area): Billy Schaeffer, St. John's

== Coaching changes ==
A number of teams changed coaches during the season and after it ended.

Team	Former Coach	Interim Coach	New Coach	Reason
Abilene Christian	Garnie Hatch		Willard Tate	
American	Tom Young		Jim Lynam	Young left to coach Rutgers.
Auburn	Bill Lynn		Bob Davis	
Baylor	Bill Menefee		Carroll Dawson	
Boise State	Murray Satterfield		Bus Connor	
Detroit	Jim Harding		Dick Vitale	
Duke	Bucky Waters		Neil McGeachy	
Est Tennessee State	Madison Brooks		Leroy Fisher	
Eastern Kentucky	Guy R. Strong		Bob Mulcahy	Strong left to coach Oklahoma State.
Florida	Tommy Bartlett		John Lotz	
Georgia	Ken Rosemond		John Guthrie	
Georgia Tech	John Hyder		Dwane Morrison	
Harvard	Bob Harrison		Satch Sanders	
Hawaii	Red Rocha		Bruce O'Neil	
Iona	Jim McDermott		Gene Roberti	
Jacksonville	Tom Wasdin		Bob Gottlieb	
Long Beach State	Jerry Tarkanian		Lute Olson	Tarkanian left to coach UNLV.
Loyola (Calif.)	Richard Baker		Dave Benaderet	
Northern Illinois	Tom Jorgensen		Emory Luck	
Northwestern	Brad Snyder		Tex Winter	
Oklahoma	John MacLeod		Joe Ramsey	
Oklahoma City	Abe Lemons		Paul Hansen	
Oklahoma State	Sam Aubrey		Guy R. Strong	
Rhode Island	Tom Carmody		Jack Kraft	
Rutgers	Dick Floyd		Tom Young	
Saint Francis (PA)	Dick Conover		Pete Lonergan	
Saint Mary's	Bruce Hale		Frank LaPorte	
St. Bonaventure	Larry Weise		Jim Satalin	
St. Francis (NY)	Lester Yellin		John M. Prenderville	
St. John's	Frank Mulzoff		Lou Carnesecca	
Southwestern Louisiana	Beryl Shipley		None	The NCAA shut down the Ragin' Cajun program for the 1973–74 and 1974–75 seasons due to over 100 rules violations.
Temple	Harry Litwack		Don Casey	
Tulane	Dick Longo		Charles Moir	
UNLV	John Bayer		Jerry Tarkanian	
Utah State	T. L. Plain		Dutch Belnap	
Villanova	Jack Kraft		Rollie Massimino	
West Texas State	Dennis Walling		Ron Ekker	
Wyoming	Bill Strannigan		Moe Radovich	
Xavier	Dick Campbell		Tay Baker	
