= 1972–73 UCLA Bruins men's basketball team =

American college basketball season

1972–73 UCLA Bruins men's basketball

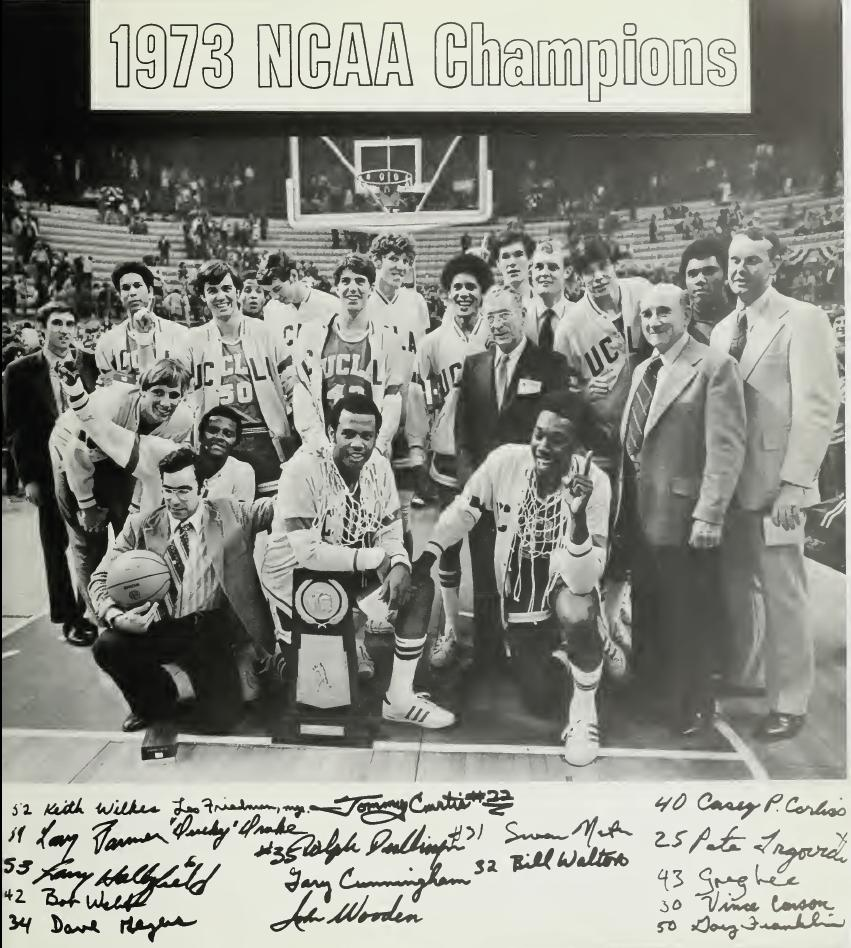

NCAA tournament National champions NCAA regular season champions Pac-8 champions

National Championship Game, W 87–66 vs. Memphis State
- Conference: Pacific-8 Conference

Ranking
- Coaches: No. 1
- AP: No. 1
- Record: 30–0 (14–0 Pac-8)
- Head coach: John Wooden (25th season)
- Assistant coach: Gary Cunningham
- Home arena: Pauley Pavilion

1972–73 Pacific-8 Conference men's basketball standings
	Conf.				Overall
Team	W		L	PCT	W		L	PCT
No. 1 UCLA	14	–	0	1.000	30	–	0	1.000
USC	9	–	5	.643	18	–	10	.643
Oregon	8	–	6	.571	16	–	10	.615
Stanford	7	–	7	.500	14	–	11	.560
Washington	6	–	8	.429	16	–	11	.593
Oregon State	6	–	8	.429	15	–	11	.577
California	4	–	10	.286	11	–	15	.423
Washington State	2	–	12	.143	6	–	20	.231
Rankings from AP Poll

The 1972–73 UCLA Bruins men's basketball team went undefeated again at 30–0 and claimed a seventh consecutive national championship.

In the title game of the NCAA tournament at St. Louis, junior center Bill Walton scored 44 points (21 of 22 field goal attempts) with thirteen rebounds as the top-ranked Bruins defeated #12 Memphis State, 87–66. Some regard this as the greatest ever offensive performance in American college basketball. Tied at 39 at halftime, the Bruins dominated the second half and outscored the Tigers, 48–27.

UCLA set a new NCAA record of 75 consecutive wins and a three-season composite record of 89–1 (.989).

== Roster ==
1972–73 UCLA Bruins men's basketball team
Players
Coaches

Pos.	#	Name	Height	Weight	Year	Hometown
F	30	Vince Carson	6 ft 5 in (1.96 m)	—	Jr
G	22	Tommy Curtis	5 ft 11 in (1.8 m)	170 lb (77 kg)	Jr	Tampa, Florida
F	54	Larry Farmer (C)	6 ft 5 in (1.96 m)	—	Sr
F	50	Gary Franklin	6 ft 5 in (1.96 m)	—	Jr
F	53	Larry Hollyfield	6 ft 5 in (1.96 m)	215 lb (98 kg)	Sr
G	43	Greg Lee	6 ft 4 in (1.93 m)	—	Jr	Reseda, California
F	34	Dave Meyers	6 ft 7 in (2.01 m)	215 lb (98 kg)	So	San Diego, CA
C	31	Swen Nater	6 ft 11 in (2.11 m)	240 lb (109 kg)	Sr	Den Helder, Netherlands
G	25	Pete Trgovich	6 ft 5 in (1.96 m)	—	So	East Chicago, Indiana
C	32	Bill Walton	6 ft 11 in (2.11 m)	210 lb (95 kg)	Jr	La Mesa, California
F	52	Keith Wilkes	6 ft 6 in (1.98 m)	190 lb (86 kg)	Jr	Berkeley, California

Head coach

John Wooden (Purdue)

Assistant coach(es)

Gary Cunningham (UCLA)

Legend

- (C) Team captain
- (S) Suspended
- (I) Ineligible
- (W) Walk-on
- Injured
- Current redshirt

Roster

=== Starting lineup ===
Position	Player	Class
F	Larry Farmer	Senior
F	Keith Wilkes	Junior
C	Bill Walton	Junior
G	Larry Hollyfield	Senior
G	Greg Lee	Junior

== Schedule ==
Date time, TV	Rank^{#}	Opponent^{#}	Result	Record	Site city, state
Regular Season
November 25, 1972*	No. 1	Wisconsin	W 114–53	1–0	Pauley Pavilion; Los Angeles, CA
December 1, 1972*	No. 1	Bradley	W 83–38	2–0	Pauley Pavilion; Los Angeles, CA
December 2, 1972*	No. 1	Pacific	W 101–48	3–0	Pauley Pavilion; Los Angeles, CA
December 16, 1972*	No. 1	UCSB	W 108–67	4–0	Pauley Pavilion; Los Angeles, CA
December 22, 1972*	No. 1	Pittsburgh	W 119–73	5–0	Pauley Pavilion; Los Angeles, CA
December 23, 1972*	No. 1	Notre Dame	W 112–56	6–0	Pauley Pavilion; Los Angeles, CA
December 29, 1972*	No. 1	vs. Drake; Sugar Bowl Classic	W 115–72	7–0	Municipal Auditorium; New Orleans, LA
December 30, 1972*	No. 1	vs. Illinois; Sugar Bowl Classic	W 91–64	8–0	Municipal Auditorium (7,123); New Orleans, LA
January 5, 1973	No. 1	Oregon	W 74–38	9–0 (1–0)	Pauley Pavilion; Los Angeles, CA
January 6, 1973	No. 1	Oregon State	W 95–61	10–0 (2–0)	Pauley Pavilion; Los Angeles, CA
January 12, 1973	No. 1	at Stanford	W 102–67	11–0 (3–0)	Maples Pavilion; Stanford, CA
January 13, 1973	No. 1	at California	W 89–50	12–0 (4–0)	Harmon Gym; Berkeley, CA
January 19, 1973*	No. 1	No. 10 San Francisco	W 102–64	13–0	Pauley Pavilion; Los Angeles, CA
January 20, 1973*	No. 1	No. 9 Providence	W 121–77	14–0	Pauley Pavilion; Los Angeles, CA
January 25, 1973*	No. 1	at Loyola–Chicago	W 107–73	15–0	Chicago Stadium (15,817); Chicago, IL
January 27, 1973*	No. 1	at Notre Dame	W 102–63	16–0	Athletic & Convocation Center; Notre Dame, IN
February 3, 1973	No. 1	at No. 20 USC	W 99–56	17–0 (5–0)	Los Angeles Memorial Sports Arena; Los Angeles, CA
February 10, 1973	No. 1	at Washington State	W 108–50	18–0 (6–0)	Bohler Gymnasium; Pullman, WA
February 12, 1973	No. 1	at Washington	W 106–67	19–0 (7–0)	Hec Edmundson Pavilion; Seattle, WA
February 16, 1973	No. 1	Washington	W 103–60	20–0 (8–0)	Pauley Pavilion; Los Angeles, CA
February 17, 1973	No. 1	Washington State	W 116–64	21–0 (9–0)	Pauley Pavilion; Los Angeles, CA
February 22, 1973	No. 1	at Oregon	W 82–62	22–0 (10–0)	McArthur Court; Eugene, OR
February 24, 1973	No. 1	Oregon State	W 103–67	23–0 (11–0)	Gill Coliseum; Corvallis, OR
March 2, 1973	No. 1	California	W 81–45	24–0 (12–0)	Pauley Pavilion; Los Angeles, CA
March 3, 1973	No. 1	Stanford	W 81–45	25–0 (13–0)	Pauley Pavilion; Los Angeles, CA
March 9, 1973	No. 1	USC	W 86–56	26–0 (14–0)	Pauley Pavilion; Los Angeles, CA
NCAA Tournament
March 15, 1973*	No. 1	vs. No. 16 Arizona State; Regional semifinal	W 98–81	27–0	Pauley Pavilion (12,671); Los Angeles, CA
March 17, 1973*	No. 1	vs. No. 20 San Francisco; Regional Final	W 74–39	28–0	Pauley Pavilion (12,705); Los Angeles, CA
March 24, 1973*; 1:30 pm, NBC	No. 1	vs. No. 6 Indiana; National semifinal	W 70–59	29–0	St. Louis Arena (19,029); St. Louis, MO
March 26, 1973*; 6:10 pm, NBC	No. 1	vs. No. 12 Memphis State; National Final	W 87–66	30–0	St. Louis Arena (19,301); St. Louis, MO
*Non-conference game. ^{#}Rankings from AP Poll. (#) Tournament seedings in parentheses. All times are in Pacific time.

== Notes ==
- The 1972 team was ranked No. 1 by both AP and UPI pre-season polls
- Walton set a school record with 506 rebounds
- Larry Farmer and Larry Hollyfield became the only players to have the best winning record over a three-year period, 89–1.
- In the semifinal against #6 Indiana, the Hoosiers rallied in the second half to give the Bruins a scare. Curtis scored 22 points off the bench to help UCLA with the 70–59 victory.
- Walton and Keith Wilkes were consensus first team All-Americans.

== Awards and honors ==
- Bill Walton, James E. Sullivan Award, which recognizes the top amateur athlete in the United States
- Bill Walton, USBWA College Player of the Year
- Bill Walton, Naismith College Player of the Year
- Bill Walton, Adolph Rupp Trophy
