= 1973 NCAA University Division basketball championship game =

1973 NCAA Tournament Championship Game
National championship game
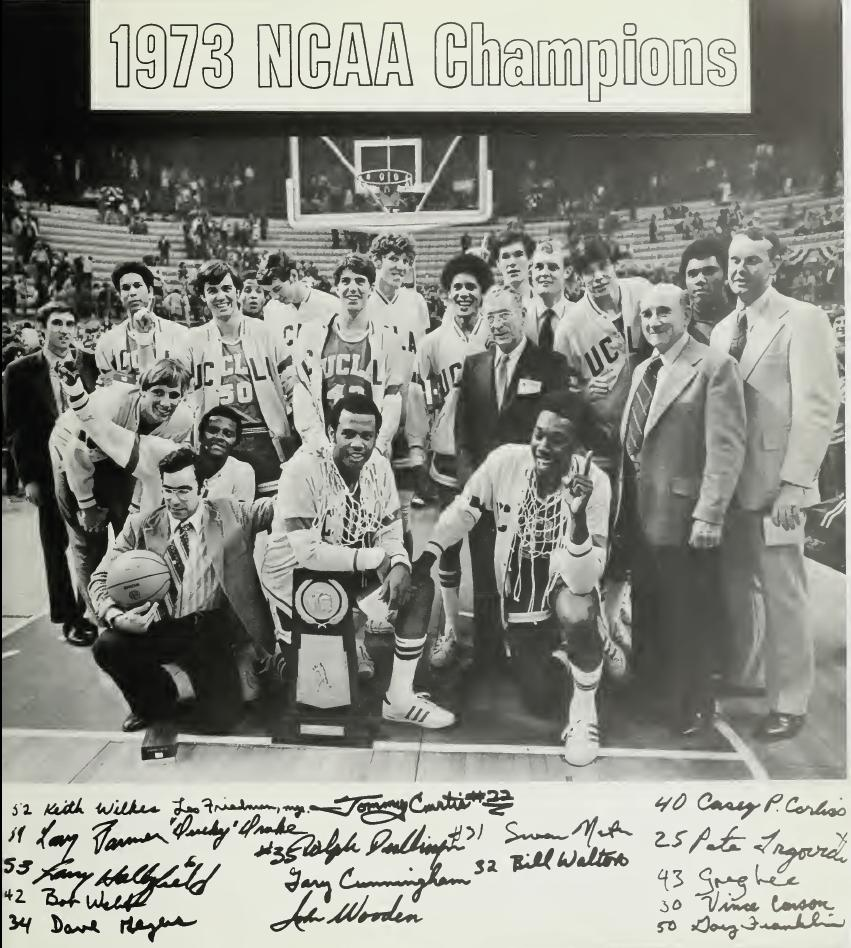
- The UCLA Bruins posing with the championship trophy
UCLA Bruins	Memphis State Tigers
Pac-8	MVC
(29–0)	(24–5)
87	66
Head coach: John Wooden	Head coach: Gene Bartow
- AP: 1
- Coaches: 1
- AP: 12
- Coaches: 11
	1st half	2nd half	Total
UCLA Bruins	39	48	87
Memphis State Tigers	39	27	66
- Date: March 26, 1973
- Venue: St. Louis Arena, St. Louis, Missouri
- Referees: Jim Howell, Joe Shosid
- Attendance: 19,301

United States TV coverage
- Network: NBC
- Announcers: Curt Gowdy and Tom Hawkins

The 1973 NCAA University Division Basketball Championship Game was the final of the 1973 NCAA University Division basketball tournament and determined the national champion for the 1972–73 season. The game was held at the St. Louis Arena in St. Louis, Missouri, on March 26, 1973.

The UCLA Bruins of the Pacific-8 Conference, who were seeking their seventh consecutive championship, were matched against the Memphis State Tigers (now known as the Memphis Tigers), (Note: The university officially changed its name from "Memphis State University" to "The University of Memphis" in 1994.) who were playing in the national title game for the first time. The Bruins won 87–66 behind a 44-point effort by Bill Walton, who scored on 21 of his 22 field goal attempts.

== Background ==
=== UCLA Bruins ===
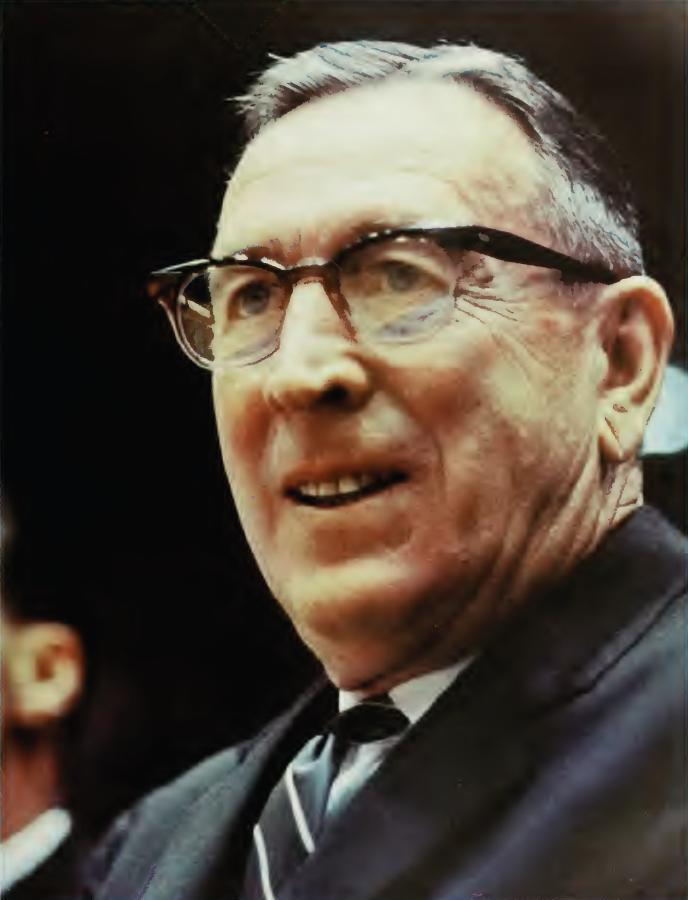
John Wooden was UCLA's head coach.

The Bruins were coached by John Wooden, who was in his 25th season with the team. UCLA entered the 1972–73 season as the six-time defending national champions, and the Bruins were coming off of an undefeated 30–0 season in 1971–72. Five players on UCLA's roster later played in the National Basketball Association (NBA). Center Bill Walton was the Bruins' top scorer and rebounder, averaging 20.4 points and 16.9 rebounds. Forward Jamaal Wilkes added 14.8 points and 7.3 rebounds per game, while forward Larry Farmer and guard Larry Hollyfield also averaged more than 10 points per game. Other players included centers Ralph Drollinger and Swen Nater, forwards Dave Meyers and Vince Carson, and guards Tommy Curtis, Greg Lee, and Pete Trgovich.

The preseason Associated Press (AP) Poll ranked the Bruins as the number one team in the country. UCLA's first game was on November 25, 1972, against Wisconsin; the Bruins won by a 41-point margin. In each of their first six non-conference games, all of which were held at Pauley Pavilion, they won by double digits; during this stretch, Pittsburgh was the only team to lose against UCLA by less than 20 points. An 85–72 victory over Drake improved the Bruins to 7–0, before Illinois became the first team to keep the final score within 10 points, as UCLA claimed a 71–64 win in their game on December 30.

The Bruins' first game in 1973 was their Pacific-8 Conference opener at home against Oregon, which they won 64–38 to move to 9–0 on the season. Three conference victories followed, before UCLA prevailed in four consecutive non-conference matchups to run their record to 16–0. The first two non-conference wins were over teams ranked in the top 10 at the time of the games; 10th-ranked San Francisco fell 92–64 on January 19, while number nine Providence was defeated by 24 points. On January 27, UCLA posted an 82–63 victory over Notre Dame. It was the school's 61st straight win in men's basketball, breaking an NCAA record that had been held by San Francisco. The Bruins returned to conference play with a 79–56 win at 20th-ranked USC, and the team continued its winning streak into March; a triumph over California improved its record to 24–0. On March 3, Stanford played the Bruins at Pauley Pavilion and held them to a season-low 51 points. In their closest game of the season, UCLA managed a 51–45 win. The Bruins then won their regular season finale against USC to finish at a perfect 26–0; with a 14–0 mark in Pacific-8 games; they won the conference championship. UCLA maintained its number one ranking in the AP Poll for the entire season.

UCLA received an invitation to the 1973 NCAA Tournament and was placed in the West region. In their first game of the tournament, the Bruins faced Arizona State, winning 98–81 to advance to the regional final against San Francisco. There, they won by a 15-point margin to earn a berth in the Final Four. Indiana was UCLA's opponent in that round, and the Bruins jumped out to a 40–22 lead at halftime. Although the Hoosiers went on a 17–0 scoring run in the second half and pulled within two points of the Bruins multiple times, UCLA won 70–59 to reach the title game. The team shot 58.5% from the field, as Walton had 14 points and Wilkes added 13.

=== Memphis State Tigers ===
Gene Bartow was the coach of Memphis State, having been hired by the university for the 1970–71 season. The Tigers' leading scorer was guard Larry Finch, who averaged 24.0 points per game on 44.5% shooting. Future NBA player Larry Kenon, a forward, also averaged more than 20 points per game, on 52.5% shooting, and led Memphis State in rebounding with 16.7 per game. Center Ronnie Robinson had 13.5 points and 11.2 rebounds per game. Other regulars included center Wes Westfall, forwards Ken Andrews and Billy Buford, and guards Bill Cook, Bill Laurie and Doug McKinnie.

Memphis State began the season ranked 11th in the country, but the team lost three of its first five games. Following a season-opening win over Missouri Western, LSU defeated the Tigers 94–81 on December 5, 1972. A visit to fifth-ranked Marquette resulted in a three-point defeat, and an 80–79 loss to Texas left the Tigers with a 2–3 record. They evened their record at 3–3 on December 16, with an 80–51 victory over Navy. That was the start of an extended winning steak; after wins against Arkansas, Cornell, and UC Santa Barbara, the Tigers traveled to Vanderbilt for a meeting with a top-10 opponent. With a 74–71 road victory, Memphis State extended its streak to five games before the start of Missouri Valley Conference (MVC) play.

Drake was Memphis State's first opponent in MVC competition. The Tigers were taken to double overtime by Drake, but earned a 97–92 victory. Subsequent wins against Bradley, Saint Louis, Louisville, and New Mexico State improved the Tigers to 5–0 in the conference. They were followed by the team's second contests of the season against Drake and Bradley, both of which they won; at this point the club's winning streak had reached 14 games. By late January, the Tigers had returned to being ranked in the AP Poll; in the February 6 ranking, Memphis State was listed at number 15. In the Tigers' next game, on February 8, Louisville ended their winning streak by an 83–69 margin. Afterwards, the Tigers won their next five games, all against MVC opponents, before losing to Saint Louis, 70–56, in their regular season finale. The Tigers finished in first place in the MVC with a 12–2 mark in conference play, and were 21–5 overall. Their final national ranking was 12th.

Like UCLA, the Tigers received a bye in the first round of the NCAA Tournament. They defeated South Carolina in the Midwest regional semifinals by 14 points. Memphis State then posted a 20-point win over Kansas State to gain their Final Four spot. In the national semifinals, Providence opposed the Tigers and took a double-digit advantage before one of their leading players, Marvin Barnes, was forced to leave the game due to a knee injury. After trailing at halftime by nine points, the Tigers rallied to win, 98–85, and secure their place in the national championship game. Kenon led Memphis State with 28 points, while Robinson had 24 and Finch added 21. It was the school's first trip to an NCAA Tournament final, having never made it past the first round in three previous appearances.

== Game summary ==
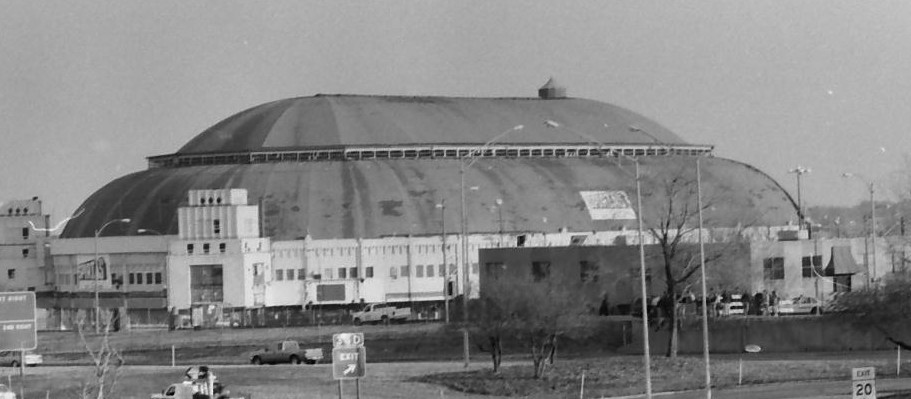
The St. Louis Arena was the site of the 1973 national championship game.

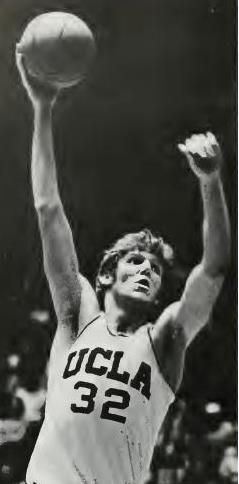
Bill Walton (pictured in 1974) made 21 of his 22 shots in the game.

The game was held on March 26 at the St. Louis Arena in St. Louis, Missouri, before a crowd of 19,301 fans. It was preceded by a contest between Indiana and Providence for third place. Behind a pair of 21-point efforts by Steve Downing and John Ritter, Indiana prevailed by 18 points, 97–79. The championship game was televised by NBC, which purchased the broadcasting rights to the 1973 NCAA Tournament for less than $1.2 million. Curt Gowdy provided play-by-play commentary for NBC, and Tom Hawkins worked alongside him as an analyst. Having been held on Saturdays in previous years, the 1973 title game was moved to Monday. It was the first basketball national championship game to appear in prime time, and received a 20.5 Nielsen rating; an estimated 39 million people watched the broadcast, the most ever for an NCAA Tournament game at the time. The telecast garnered a 36.0 rating in the Los Angeles market.

Memphis State began the game in a man-to-man defense, in which Kenon was the primary defender covering Walton, playing behind him. The team's plan was to force Walton to play away from the basket, but his ability to use his strength to gain positioning rendered the strategy largely ineffective. Walton played a key role early on for the Bruins; of the team's first 10 points, he had six of them. Kenon led the Tigers in the first six minutes of the game, converting each of his first four field goal attempts. However, the Tigers' taller players were in the process of accumulating personal fouls. Kenon committed three fouls in the first 6:43 and was forced to the bench for an extended period. At this point, he had been responsible for 8 of Memphis State's 12 points. The Bruins built a lead as the first half progressed, taking a nine-point advantage at one time. Finch then helped the Tigers get back into the game with a stretch of eight consecutive points. Memphis State began utilizing a zone defense, and Kenon returned to the game; he was still positioned behind Walton defensively. The Tigers were helped by an accumulation of fouls by Walton, who picked up his third and came out of the game with 4:14 remaining in the first half as the Bruins retained a six-point lead. After his departure, the Tigers' offensive players found greater success, scoring eight of the next 10 points. After the first half, the teams were tied, 39–39.

Finch opened the second half scoring for Memphis State with two free throws, which gave the Tigers the lead. Walton responded for the Bruins with three field goals in a row. UCLA frequently sought to take advantage of a size advantage Walton held over shorter Memphis State defenders by having Lee throw lob passes to him. Much of Walton's offense came from these lobs, which often led to tip-ins. His scoring, which primarily came from near the basket, also resulted from layups and short jumpers, including bank and hook shots. The Tigers further varied their defense against him, at times putting a defender in front of Walton or covering him with two players, but were unable to keep him in check. Walton continued to be the focal point of the Bruins' attack, scoring all but 4 of their first 18 points in the half. Although the teams were tied 45–45 at one time, UCLA gradually gained control of the game as the second half progressed. The Bruins were up by four points with under 13 minutes left in the game when Walton drove to the basket for a shot attempt. Westfall fouled Walton, but was unable to prevent his shot from falling. His foul was ruled intentional, giving Walton two free throws that he made to extend UCLA's advantage to eight points with 12:24 remaining. Eight minutes into the second half, the lead had increased to 57–47. With 9:27 left, and the Bruins up 61–55, Walton committed his fourth foul. Instead of pulling him from the game, Wooden elected to leave him on the court and the Bruins subsequently extended their lead to 10.

With under eight minutes on the clock, and the Tigers' deficit at 65–57, Walton recorded three quick baskets to push the gap to 12 points. For the rest of the game, Memphis State never trailed by less than nine points. Having been up by 11 points 14 minutes into the second half, UCLA pulled away in the final minutes of the contest, scoring 14 of the last 18 points. Walton was forced to come out of the game with 2:50 remaining due to an ankle injury, but by this time the Bruins had a 15-point advantage. The Tigers' Finch helped him off the court, and Walton received a standing ovation from the crowd. The Bruins won by an 87–66 margin to clinch the school's seventh NCAA title in a row and its ninth in a 10-year span.

== Statistical summary ==
The Bruins scored on 40 of their 62 field goal attempts, for a percentage of 64.5%. Walton contributed 44 points on 21-of-22 shooting from the field. His effort broke the record for the most points in an NCAA Tournament championship game, topping the 42 points that had been scored by Gail Goodrich in 1965. Four further shots by Walton that went into the hoop were ruled out by officials because of an NCAA regulation that banned dunking; these were not included in his official statistics, and were recorded as offensive goaltending violations. He added a game-high 13 rebounds and two assists, along with seven blocks. Wilkes tallied 16 points; he joined Walton as the only Bruins players to finish with at least 10 points. Hollyfield had eight points and nine assists, and Lee topped both teams with a 14-assist performance. The Bruins' victory extended multiple winning streaks for the team. It was their 75th consecutive win overall; in the NCAA Tournament, they had a 36-game streak after their defeat of the Tigers.

Memphis State made 42.1% of its field goal attempts, shooting 24-of-57. Finch converted on nine of his 21 shots and 11 of his 13 free throw attempts, scoring 29 points to lead the Tigers. Kenon added 20 points, and had eight rebounds and three assists, both team-high totals. The Tigers committed nine fewer turnovers than the Bruins, but were outrebounded 40–21, and their 11 assists were 15 fewer than UCLA compiled.

== Aftermath and legacy ==
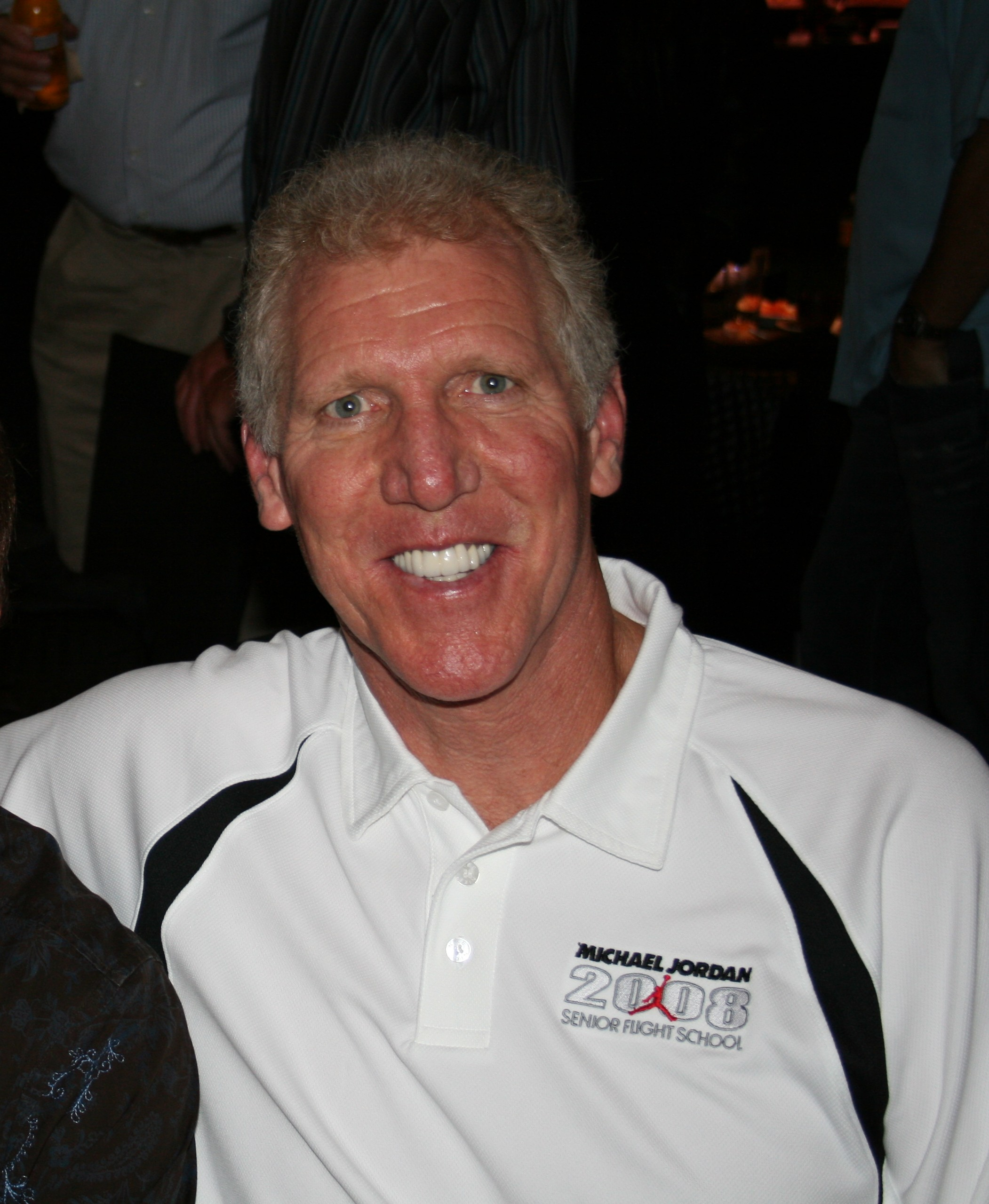
Walton scored a record 44 points in the 1973 NCAA title game.

With Walton still on their roster as a senior for the 1973–74 season, the Bruins extended their winning streak to a record 88 games before a 71–70 loss to Notre Dame. Despite that defeat and a two-game losing streak later in the season, UCLA qualified for the NCAA tournament and made it to the Final Four. There, North Carolina State defeated the Bruins in a game that ended in double overtime, leaving UCLA without an NCAA title for the first time since 1965–66. The following season, which was Wooden's last as UCLA's coach, the Bruins again reached the NCAA tournament and won the championship game over Kentucky.

Memphis State finished 19–11 in 1973–74 and did not receive an NCAA Tournament invitation. That was Bartow's last season with the Tigers. After one year at Illinois, he succeeded Wooden at UCLA and his 1975–76 team reached the Final Four. That season, Memphis State returned to the NCAA Tournament; it took another nine years for the Tigers to make another trip to the national semifinals. Having played against UCLA in the Final Four, the 2007–08 Tigers participated in the 2008 NCAA Division I championship game, losing to Kansas in overtime.

Walton's 44 points remains the most ever scored in an NCAA men's national championship game. In 2016, Bryce Miller of The San Diego Union-Tribune said that he had given "arguably the single greatest performance in NCAA history." Sports Illustrated writer Kelli Anderson listed his 1973 title game effort as one of the 10 greatest accomplishments in college sports. The magazine named it one of the "100 Greatest Moments in Sports History".

Bartow remarked after the game, "We couldn't contain Walton." He added that he had "never seen a player so dominating". Walton later said that he recalled his missed field goal attempt, which he rebounded and scored from. Wooden reportedly told him, "Walton, I used to think you were a good player ... until you missed that one shot."

== Bibliography ==
- 2020 NCAA Final Four Records Book (PDF). National Collegiate Athletic Association. 2019.
- Davis, Seth (2014). Wooden: A Coach's Life. Times Books. ISBN 978-0-8050-9280-6.
- Smith, John Matthew (2013). The Sons of Westwood: John Wooden, UCLA, and the Dynasty That Changed College Basketball. University of Illinois Press. ISBN 978-0-252-09505-4.
