= 1972–73 Houston Cougars men's basketball team =

American college basketball season

1972–73 Houston Cougars men's basketball
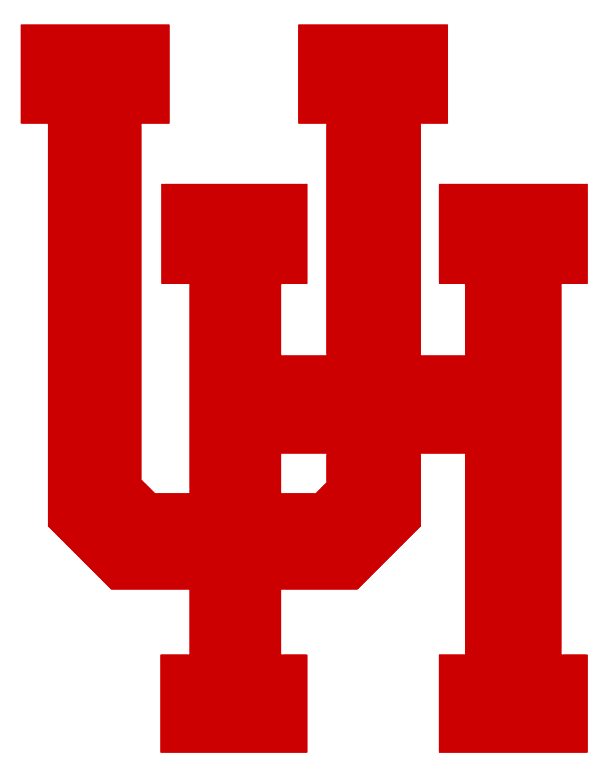

NCAA tournament, First Round
- Conference: Independent

Ranking
- Coaches: No. 18
- AP: No. 13
- Record: 23–4
- Head coach: Guy Lewis (17th season)
- Assistant coaches: Harvey Pate; Don Schverak
- Home arena: Hofheinz Pavilion

1972–73 NCAA University Division men's basketball independents standings
	Conf.				Overall
Team	W		L	PCT	W		L	PCT
No. 4 Providence		–		–	27	–	4	.871
No. 5 Marquette		–		–	27	–	4	.871
No. 13 Houston		–		–	23	–	4	.852
No. 14 Syracuse		–		–	24	–	5	.828
Virginia Tech		–		–	22	–	5	.815
Jacksonville		–		–	21	–	6	.778
Oklahoma City		–		–	21	–	6	.778
Oral Roberts		–		–	21	–	6	.778
South Carolina		–		–	22	–	7	.759
Marshall		–		–	20	–	7	.741
Northeastern		–		–	19	–	7	.731
St. John's		–		–	19	–	7	.731
Centenary		–		–	19	–	8	.704
Florida State		–		–	18	–	8	.692
Northern Illinois		–		–	17	–	8	.680
Duquesne		–		–	16	–	8	.667
Fairfield		–		–	18	–	9	.667
Cincinnati		–		–	17	–	9	.654
Denver		–		–	17	–	9	.654
George Washington		–		–	17	–	9	.654
Penn State		–		–	15	–	8	.652
Detroit		–		–	16	–	9	.640
Hardin–Simmons		–		–	16	–	9	.640
Indiana State		–		–	16	–	10	.615
Manhattan		–		–	16	–	10	.615
Utah State		–		–	16	–	10	.615
Notre Dame		–		–	18	–	12	.600
Air Force		–		–	14	–	10	.583
Creighton		–		–	15	–	11	.577
Hawaii		–		–	15	–	11	.577
Rutgers		–		–	15	–	11	.577
Stetson		–		–	15	–	11	.577
DePaul		–		–	14	–	11	.560
South Alabama		–		–	14	–	11	.560
Trinity (TX)		–		–	14	–	11	.560
Canisius		–		–	13	–	11	.542
Butler		–		–	14	–	12	.538
Charlotte		–		–	14	–	12	.538
Illinois State		–		–	13	–	12	.520
Long Island		–		–	13	–	12	.520
Navy		–		–	13	–	12	.520
Dayton		–		–	13	–	13	.500
Fairleigh Dickinson		–		–	13	–	13	.500
St. Bonaventure		–		–	13	–	13	.500
Portland State		–		–	12	–	12	.500
Georgetown		–		–	12	–	14	.462
Pittsburgh		–		–	12	–	14	.462
Tulane		–		–	12	–	14	.462
Army		–		–	11	–	13	.458
Boston College		–		–	11	–	14	.440
Colgate		–		–	11	–	14	.440
Villanova		–		–	11	–	14	.440
Fordham		–		–	12	–	16	.429
Southern Illinois		–		–	11	–	15	.423
West Virginia		–		–	10	–	15	.400
Cleveland State		–		–	9	–	14	.391
Ball State		–		–	9	–	15	.375
Niagara		–		–	9	–	16	.360
Loyola (IL)		–		–	8	–	15	.348
Holy Cross		–		–	9	–	17	.346
Southern Miss		–		–	8	–	16	.333
St. Francis (NY)		–		–	8	–	16	.333
Portland		–		–	9	–	19	.321
Seton Hall		–		–	8	–	17	.320
Georgia Southern		–		–	8	–	18	.308
Saint Peter's		–		–	8	–	18	.308
Georgia Tech		–		–	7	–	18	.280
Iona		–		–	6	–	16	.273
Samford		–		–	5	–	20	.200
Saint Francis (PA)		–		–	5	–	21	.192
Pan American		–		–	4	–	22	.154
Xavier		–		–	3	–	23	.115
Rankings from AP Poll

The 1972–73 Houston Cougars men's basketball team represented the University of Houston in NCAA University Division competition in the 1972–73 season.

Houston, coached by Guy Lewis, played its home games in the Hofheinz Pavilion in Houston, Texas, and was then an Independent.

== Roster ==
1972–73 Houston Cougars men's basketball team
Players
Coaches

Pos.	#	Name	Height	Weight	Year	Previous school	Hometown
F	12	Dwight Jones	6 ft 10 in (2.08 m)	210 lb (95 kg)	Sr	Wheatley HS	Houston, Texas
F	22	Louis Dunbar	6 ft 9 in (2.06 m)	—	So	Webster HS	Minden, Louisiana
F	52	Steve Newsome	6 ft 8 in (2.03 m)	—	Sr		Columbia, Missouri

Head coach

- Guy Lewis (Houston)

Assistant coach(es)

- Harvey Pate (Oklahoma State)
- Don Schverak (Houston)

Legend

- (C) Team captain
- (S) Suspended
- (I) Ineligible
- (W) Walk-on
- Injured
- Current redshirt

Roster

== Schedule and results ==
Date time, TV	Rank^{#}	Opponent^{#}	Result	Record	Site city, state
Regular season
Nov 24, 1972	No. 15	LSU–New Orleans	W 92–71	1–0	Hofheinz Pavilion; Houston, Texas
Nov 27, 1972	No. 15	Southern Miss	W 104–77	2–0	Hofheinz Pavilion; Houston, Texas
Dec 1, 1972	No. 15	at Washington State	W 72–60	3–0	Bohler Gymnasium; Pullman, Washington
Dec 2, 1972	No. 15	at Seattle	L 61–65	3–1	Seattle Center Coliseum; Seattle, Washington
Dec 4, 1972	No. 20	at Colorado	W 77–72	4–1	Balch Fieldhouse; Boulder, Colorado
Dec 9, 1972	No. 20	Xavier	W 114–73	5–1	Hofheinz Pavilion; Houston, Texas
Dec 11, 1972	No. 16	St. Mary's	W 59–47	6–1	Hofheinz Pavilion; Houston, Texas
Dec 16, 1972	No. 16	California	W 79–75	7–1	Hofheinz Pavilion; Houston, Texas
Dec 28, 1972	No. 13	vs. No. 15 Indiana; Sun Bowl Classic	L 72–75	7–2	Memorial Gymnasium; El Paso, Texas
Dec 29, 1972	No. 13	vs. SMU; Sun Bowl Classic	W 115–102	8–2	Memorial Gymnasium; El Paso, Texas
Jan 5, 1973	No. 10	West Texas State; Bluebonnet Classic	W 130–84	9–2	Hofheinz Pavilion; Houston, Texas
Jan 6, 1973	No. 10	Texas A&M; Bluebonnet Classic	W 114–85	10–2	Hofheinz Pavilion; Houston, Texas
Jan 10, 1973	No. 10	Baylor	W 86–82	11–2	Hofheinz Pavilion; Houston, Texas
Jan 16, 1973	No. 12	at Rice	W 96–77	12–2	Rice Gymnasium; Houston, Texas
Jan 27, 1973	No. 11	UNLV	W 104–94	13–2	Hofheinz Pavilion; Houston, Texas
Feb 1, 1973	No. 11	Centenary (LA)	W 89–85	14–2	Hofheinz Pavilion; Houston, Texas
Feb 2, 1973	No. 11	Cincinnati	W 90–85	15–2	Hofheinz Pavilion; Houston, Texas
Feb 8, 1973	No. 11	Houston Baptist	W 96–75	16–2	Hofheinz Pavilion; Houston, Texas
Feb 10, 1973	No. 11	No. 13 Southwestern Louisiana	W 82–80	17–2	Hofheinz Pavilion; Houston, Texas
Feb 15, 1973	No. 7	Texas A&I–Corpus Christi	W 82–70	18–2	Hofheinz Pavilion; Houston, Texas
Feb 17, 1973	No. 7	at Creighton	L 77–78	18–3	Omaha Civic Auditorium; Omaha, Nebraska
Feb 22, 1973	No. 9	Trinity (TX)	W 116–57	19–3	Hofheinz Pavilion; Houston, Texas
Feb 24, 1973	No. 9	No. 20 Jacksonville	W 76–75	20–3	Hofheinz Pavilion; Houston, Texas
Feb 26, 1973	No. 8	Samford	W 94–75	21–3	Hofheinz Pavilion; Houston, Texas
Mar 2, 1973	No. 8	at Centenary (LA)	W 90–89	22–3	Gold Dome; Shreveport, Louisiana
Mar 5, 1973	No. 7	Rice	W 116–72	23–3	Hofheinz Pavilion; Houston, Texas
NCAA tournament
Mar 10, 1973	No. 7	vs. No. 14 Southwestern Louisiana; Regional quarterfinals – First round	L 89–102	23–4	Levitt Arena; Wichita, Kansas
*Non-conference game. ^{#}Rankings from AP Poll. (#) Tournament seedings in parentheses. All times are in Central Time.

== Rankings ==
Ranking movements Legend: ██ Increase in ranking ██ Decrease in ranking — = Not ranked
	Week															
Poll	Pre	1	2	3	4	5	6	7	8	9	10	11	12	13	14	Final
AP	15	20	16	14	13	10	10	12	11	11	11	7	9	8	7	13
Coaches	11	—	15	18	—	—	15	12	9	11	11	8	10	9	9	18
