= Dave Gavitt =

American college basketball coach

Biographical details
- Born: October 26, 1937; Hartford, Connecticut, U.S.
- Died: September 16, 2011 (aged 73) near Rumford, Rhode Island, U.S.

Playing career

Basketball
- 1959–1960: Dartmouth

Coaching career (HC unless noted)

Basketball
- 1960–1962: Worcester Academy (assistant)
- 1962–1966: Providence (assistant)
- 1966–1967: Dartmouth (assistant)
- 1967–1969: Dartmouth
- 1969–1979: Providence

Administrative career (AD unless noted)
- 1971–1982: Providence
- 1979–1990: Big East (commissioner)
- 1990–1994: Boston Celtics (CEO)

Head coaching record
- Overall: 209–84
- Tournaments: 5–6 (NCAA University Division / Division I); 6–4 (NIT)
- Basketball Hall of Fame; Inducted in 2006 (profile)
- College Basketball Hall of Fame; Inducted in 2006

David Roy Gavitt (October 26, 1937 – September 16, 2011) was an American college basketball coach and athletic director at Providence College in Providence, Rhode Island. He was also well known as the first commissioner of the Big East Conference and as part of the committee which created the 1992 Olympic basketball "Dream Team".

== Coaching career ==
Raised in Westerly, Rhode Island and Peterborough, New Hampshire, Gavitt graduated from Dartmouth College in 1959, where he was a member of the 1959–1960 varsity basketball team, the last Dartmouth basketball team to win the Ivy League championship. While an undergraduate at Dartmouth in 1958, Gavitt played summer collegiate baseball for the Orleans Cardinals of the Cape Cod Baseball League (CCBL). He later became player-manager of the CCBL's Harwich Mariners, then returned to Orleans as manager in 1963–64 and 1966–67.

Gavitt spent two years as an assistant basketball coach at Worcester Academy before becoming an assistant coach at Providence under the legendary Joe Mullaney in 1962. He left in 1966 to become assistant coach and then head coach at his alma mater before taking over for Mullaney at Providence in 1969.

Under his ten-year tenure, the Friars advanced to the postseason eight straight years (1971–78; five NCAA appearances, 1972–'74, '77–'78, and three NIT appearances, 1971, '75, 76). In 1973, Gavitt's team made it to the Final Four for the first time in school history. He also served as director of athletics at PC from 1971 to 1982, and was at that position when the school's women's athletics programs were started as a result of Title IX.

== The Big East, USA Basketball and beyond ==
In 1979, Gavitt, along with several other college athletics administrators, helped to form the Big East Conference as a means to better compete with the major schools in the country. He became the conference's first commissioner, from 1979 to 1990. Under his direction, the Big East steadily expanded and was an almost immediate success, as several schools became basketball powerhouses (culminating in the 1985 Final Four, in which three schools from the conference – Georgetown, Saint John's, and eventual champion Villanova – were present).

During his tenure, six of the conference's schools (Georgetown, Villanova, Saint John's, Providence, Seton Hall and Syracuse) participated in the Final Four, and all nine teams made it to the NCAA tournament at least once. His contributions are memorialized in the Dave Gavitt Trophy, given to the winner of the Big East's men's basketball tournament, which he was responsible for not only creating, but its annual use of Madison Square Garden. Also, from 1982 to 1984, he was chairman of the NCAA Division I Basketball Committee. It was under his guidance that the tournament expanded to 64 teams, in order to provide better opportunity for small conference teams to participate. He was also responsible for the playing of Final Four games in larger venues such as domed stadiums, and the first full contract with a television network to provide universal coverage of the tournament, further adding to the tournament's popularity and prestige.

Gavitt has also been involved in Olympic basketball. In 1980, he was selected as the head coach of the Olympic basketball team, only to lose out on the opportunity due to the boycott of the Moscow games by the United States. He would also go on to serve on the Olympic governing body, including a presidency from 1988 to 1992. It was during his tenure that he developed the concept of the "Dream Team," an Olympic basketball team composed of the NBA's best.

Besides these responsibilities, Gavitt was CEO of the Boston Celtics from 1990 to 1994, President of the NCAA Foundation from 1995 to 1997, and Chairman of the Board of the Naismith Memorial Basketball Hall of Fame until 2003. He is a member of the Providence College Athletic Hall of Fame (1984), National Association of Collegiate Directors of Athletics Hall of Fame (2000), and the International Scholar-Athlete Hall of Fame (2000). Gavitt was inducted into the Basketball Hall of Fame on September 8, 2006. He became the third former member of the Friar athletic program (after John Thompson and Lenny Wilkens), and the first native of Rhode Island to be enshrined. The Providence Friars' court at the Amica Mutual Pavilion is named after Gavitt.

== Death ==
Gavitt died on September 16, 2011, from congestive heart failure in a hospital near his hometown of Rumford, Rhode Island. He was 73.

== Head coaching record ==
Record table
Season	Team	Overall	Conference	Standing	Postseason
Dartmouth Indians (Ivy League) (1967–1969)
1967–68	Dartmouth	8–18	6–8	T–4th	
1968–69	Dartmouth	10–15	4–10	6th	
Dartmouth:		18–33	10–18		
Providence Friars (NCAA University Division / Division I independent) (1969–1979)
1969–70	Providence	14–11			
1970–71	Providence	20–8			NIT Quarterfinal
1971–72	Providence	21–6			NCAA University Division First Round
1972–73	Providence	27–4			NCAA University Division Fourth Place
1973–74	Providence	28–4			NCAA Division I Regional Third Place
1974–75	Providence	20–11			NIT Runner-up
1975–76	Providence	21–11			NIT Fourth Place
1976–77	Providence	24–5			NCAA Division I First Round
1977–78	Providence	24–8			NCAA Division I First Round
1978–79	Providence	10–16			
Providence:		209–84			
Total:		209–84			

== See also ==
- List of NCAA Division I Men's Final Four appearances by coach
