= 1972–73 Memphis State Tigers men's basketball team =

American college basketball season

1972–73 Memphis State Tigers men's basketball

NCAA tournament, runner-up Missouri Valley Conference Champions

National Championship Game, L 66-87 vs. UCLA
- Conference: Missouri Valley Conference

Ranking
- Coaches: No. 11
- AP: No. 12
- Record: 24–6 (12–2 MVC)
- Head coach: Gene Bartow (3rd season)
- Home arena: Mid-South Coliseum

1972–73 Missouri Valley Conference men's basketball standings
	Conf.				Overall
Team	W		L	PCT	W		L	PCT
No. 12 Memphis State	12	–	2	.857	24	–	6	.800
Louisville	11	–	3	.786	23	–	7	.767
Saint Louis	10	–	4	.714	19	–	7	.731
Tulsa	10	–	4	.714	18	–	8	.692
New Mexico State	6	–	8	.429	12	–	14	.462
Wichita State	6	–	8	.429	10	–	16	.385
Drake	5	–	9	.357	14	–	12	.538
Bradley	4	–	10	.286	12	–	14	.462
North Texas State	4	–	10	.286	9	–	16	.360
West Texas State	2	–	12	.143	9	–	17	.346
Rankings from AP Poll

The 1972–73 Memphis State Tigers men's basketball team represented Memphis State University as a member of the Missouri Valley Conference during the 1972–73 men's college basketball season. The team was led by third-year head coach Gene Bartow and played their home games at Mid-South Coliseum in Memphis, Tennessee.

As MVC champions, the Tigers participated in the 1973 NCAA Tournament. They defeated South Carolina and Kansas State to reach the first Final Four in program history. After a win over Providence to reach the national championship game, Memphis State was defeated by unbeaten, 6-time defending National champion UCLA, 87–66. The team finished with a 24–6 record (12–2 MVC).

== Roster ==
1972–73 Memphis State Tigers men's basketball team
Players
Coaches

Pos.	#	Name	Height	Weight	Year	Hometown
G	10	Bill Laurie	5 ft 10 in (1.78 m)	160 lb (73 kg)	Jr	Versailles, Missouri
G	11	Jerry Tetzlaff	6 ft 4 in (1.93 m)	205 lb (93 kg)	Sr	South Bend, Indiana
G	12	Shannon Kennedy	6 ft 3 in (1.91 m)	165 lb (75 kg)	So	Muncie, Indiana
G	15	Jim Liss	6 ft 2 in (1.88 m)	165 lb (75 kg)	So	Crown Point, Indiana
F	20	Billy Buford	6 ft 7 in (2.01 m)	210 lb (95 kg)	Jr	Glasgow, Kentucky
G	21	Larry Finch	6 ft 2 in (1.88 m)	185 lb (84 kg)	Sr	Memphis, Tennessee
F	23	Larry Trosper	6 ft 6 in (1.98 m)	195 lb (88 kg)	So	Ripley, Tennessee
F	24	Ken Andrews	6 ft 6 in (1.98 m)	195 lb (88 kg)	Jr	Puxico, Missouri
F	33	Ronnie Robinson	6 ft 8 in (2.03 m)	200 lb (91 kg)	Sr	Memphis, Tennessee
F/C	34	Ed Wilson	6 ft 6 in (1.98 m)	225 lb (102 kg)	Fr	Memphis, Tennessee
F/C	35	Larry Kenon	6 ft 9 in (2.06 m)	205 lb (93 kg)	Jr	Birmingham, Alabama
G	40	Doug McKinney	6 ft 0 in (1.83 m)	180 lb (82 kg)	Sr	Fairfield, Ohio
F	42	Wes Westfall	6 ft 8 in (2.03 m)	210 lb (95 kg)	Jr	St. Louis, Missouri
G/F	43	Bill Cook	6 ft 5 in (1.96 m)	185 lb (84 kg)	Fr	Memphis, Tennessee

Head coach

- Gene Bartow

Assistant coach(es)

Legend

- (C) Team captain
- (S) Suspended
- (I) Ineligible
- (W) Walk-on
- Injured
- Current redshirt

Roster

== Schedule and results ==
Date time, TV	Rank^{#}	Opponent^{#}	Result	Record	Site city, state
Regular season
Dec 2, 1972*	No. 11	Missouri Western	W 108–74	1–0	Mid-South Coliseum; Memphis, Tennessee
Dec 5, 1972*	No. 11	at Louisiana State	L 81–94	1–1	Maravich Assembly Center; Baton Rouge, Louisiana
Dec 7, 1972*	No. 11	South Florida	W 87–73	2–1	Mid-South Coliseum; Memphis, Tennessee
Dec 9, 1972*	No. 11	at No. 5 Marquette	L 69–72	2–2	Milwaukee Arena; Milwaukee, Wisconsin
Dec 12, 1972*	No. 19	Texas	L 79–80	2–3	Mid-South Coliseum; Memphis, Tennessee
Dec 16, 1972*	No. 19	Navy	W 80–51	3–3	Mid-South Coliseum; Memphis, Tennessee
Dec 20, 1972*		UC Santa Barbara	W 80–74	4–3	Mid-South Coliseum; Memphis, Tennessee
Dec 23, 1972*		at Arkansas	W 87–86	5–3	Barton Coliseum; Little Rock, Arkansas
Dec 26, 1972*		Cornell	W 96–64	6–3	Mid-South Coliseum; Memphis, Tennessee
Dec 30, 1972*		at No. 10 Vanderbilt	W 74–71	7–3	Memorial Gymnasium; Nashville, Tennessee
Jan 4, 1973		at Drake	W 97–92 ^{2 OT}	8–3 (1–0)	Veterans Memorial Auditorium; Des Moines, Iowa
Jan 6, 1973		at Bradley	W 76–74	9–3 (2–0)	Robertson Memorial Field House; Peoria, Illinois
Jan 13, 1973*		Central Florida	W 124–75	10–3	Mid-South Coliseum; Memphis, Tennessee
Jan 13, 1973		Saint Louis	W 72–60	11–3 (3–0)	Mid-South Coliseum; Memphis, Tennessee
Jan 20, 1973*		Saint Joseph's (IN)	W 112–92	12–3	Mid-South Coliseum; Memphis, Tennessee
Jan 25, 1973	No. 17	Louisville	W 81–76	13–3 (4–0)	Mid-South Coliseum; Memphis, Tennessee
Jan 27, 1973	No. 17	New Mexico State	W 75–61	14–3 (5–0)	Mid-South Coliseum; Memphis, Tennessee
Feb 1, 1973	No. 17	Drake	W 73–68	15–3 (6–0)	Mid-South Coliseum; Memphis, Tennessee
Feb 3, 1973*	No. 17	Bradley	W 79–64	16–3 (7–0)	Mid-South Coliseum; Memphis, Tennessee
Feb 8, 1973	No. 15	at Louisville	L 69–83	16–4 (7–1)	Freedom Hall; Louisville, Kentucky
Feb 10, 1973	No. 15	at Tulsa	W 91–87 ^{OT}	17–4 (8–1)	Expo Square Pavilion; Tulsa, Oklahoma
Feb 15, 1973	No. 16	Wichita State	W 99–77	18–4 (9–1)	Mid-South Coliseum; Memphis, Tennessee
Feb 17, 1973	No. 16	West Texas A&M	W 116–79	19–4 (10–1)	Mid-South Coliseum; Memphis, Tennessee
Feb 22, 1973	No. 14	at North Texas	W 93–88	20–4 (11–1)	North Texas Men's Gym; Denton, Texas
Feb 24, 1973	No. 14	at New Mexico State	W 54–53	21–4 (12–1)	Pan American Center; Las Cruces, New Mexico
Mar 3, 1973	No. 10	at Saint Louis	L 56–70	21–5 (12–2)	Kiel Auditorium; St. Louis, Missouri
NCAA Tournament
Mar 15, 1973*	No. 12	vs. South Carolina; Midwest Regional semifinal – Sweet Sixteen	W 90–76	22–5	Hofheinz Pavilion; Houston, Texas
Mar 17, 1973*	No. 12	vs. No. 9 Kansas State; Midwest Regional final – Elite Eight	W 92–72	23–5	Hofheinz Pavilion; Houston, Texas
Mar 24, 1973*	No. 12	vs. No. 4 Providence; National semifinal – Final Four	W 98–85	24–5	St. Louis Arena; St. Louis, Missouri
Mar 26, 1973*	No. 12	vs. No. 1 UCLA; National Championship	L 66–87	24–6	St. Louis Arena; St. Louis, Missouri
*Non-conference game. ^{#}Rankings from AP Poll. (#) Tournament seedings in parentheses. MW=Midwest region. All times are in Eastern Time.

== Awards and honors ==
- Larry Kenon – Missouri Valley Conference Player of the Year

== NBA draft ==
Round	Pick	Player	NBA club
3	50	Larry Kenon	Detroit Pistons
4	60	Ronnie Robinson	Phoenix Suns
4	68	Larry Kenon	Los Angeles Lakers
