= 1972–73 Illinois State Redbirds men's basketball team =

American college basketball season

1972–73 Illinois State Redbirds men's basketball
- Conference: Independent
- Record: 13–12
- Head coach: Will Robinson (3rd season)
- Assistant coaches: Warren Crews; John Parker; Gene Smithson
- Home arena: Horton Field House

1972–73 NCAA University Division men's basketball independents standings
	Conf.				Overall
Team	W		L	PCT	W		L	PCT
No. 4 Providence		–		–	27	–	4	.871
No. 5 Marquette		–		–	27	–	4	.871
No. 13 Houston		–		–	23	–	4	.852
No. 14 Syracuse		–		–	24	–	5	.828
Virginia Tech		–		–	22	–	5	.815
Jacksonville		–		–	21	–	6	.778
Oklahoma City		–		–	21	–	6	.778
Oral Roberts		–		–	21	–	6	.778
South Carolina		–		–	22	–	7	.759
Marshall		–		–	20	–	7	.741
Northeastern		–		–	19	–	7	.731
St. John's		–		–	19	–	7	.731
Centenary		–		–	19	–	8	.704
Florida State		–		–	18	–	8	.692
Northern Illinois		–		–	17	–	8	.680
Duquesne		–		–	16	–	8	.667
Fairfield		–		–	18	–	9	.667
Cincinnati		–		–	17	–	9	.654
Denver		–		–	17	–	9	.654
George Washington		–		–	17	–	9	.654
Penn State		–		–	15	–	8	.652
Detroit		–		–	16	–	9	.640
Hardin–Simmons		–		–	16	–	9	.640
Indiana State		–		–	16	–	10	.615
Manhattan		–		–	16	–	10	.615
Utah State		–		–	16	–	10	.615
Notre Dame		–		–	18	–	12	.600
Air Force		–		–	14	–	10	.583
Creighton		–		–	15	–	11	.577
Hawaii		–		–	15	–	11	.577
Rutgers		–		–	15	–	11	.577
Stetson		–		–	15	–	11	.577
DePaul		–		–	14	–	11	.560
South Alabama		–		–	14	–	11	.560
Trinity (TX)		–		–	14	–	11	.560
Canisius		–		–	13	–	11	.542
Butler		–		–	14	–	12	.538
Charlotte		–		–	14	–	12	.538
Illinois State		–		–	13	–	12	.520
Long Island		–		–	13	–	12	.520
Navy		–		–	13	–	12	.520
Dayton		–		–	13	–	13	.500
Fairleigh Dickinson		–		–	13	–	13	.500
St. Bonaventure		–		–	13	–	13	.500
Portland State		–		–	12	–	12	.500
Georgetown		–		–	12	–	14	.462
Pittsburgh		–		–	12	–	14	.462
Tulane		–		–	12	–	14	.462
Army		–		–	11	–	13	.458
Boston College		–		–	11	–	14	.440
Colgate		–		–	11	–	14	.440
Villanova		–		–	11	–	14	.440
Fordham		–		–	12	–	16	.429
Southern Illinois		–		–	11	–	15	.423
West Virginia		–		–	10	–	15	.400
Cleveland State		–		–	9	–	14	.391
Ball State		–		–	9	–	15	.375
Niagara		–		–	9	–	16	.360
Loyola (IL)		–		–	8	–	15	.348
Holy Cross		–		–	9	–	17	.346
Southern Miss		–		–	8	–	16	.333
St. Francis (NY)		–		–	8	–	16	.333
Portland		–		–	9	–	19	.321
Seton Hall		–		–	8	–	17	.320
Georgia Southern		–		–	8	–	18	.308
Saint Peter's		–		–	8	–	18	.308
Georgia Tech		–		–	7	–	18	.280
Iona		–		–	6	–	16	.273
Samford		–		–	5	–	20	.200
Saint Francis (PA)		–		–	5	–	21	.192
Pan American		–		–	4	–	22	.154
Xavier		–		–	3	–	23	.115
Rankings from AP Poll

The 1972–73 Illinois State Redbirds men's basketball team represented Illinois State University during the 1972–73 NCAA University Division men's basketball season. The Redbirds, led by third-year head coach Will Robinson, played their home games at Horton Field House in Normal, Illinois and competed as an independent (not a member of a conference). They finished the season 13–12.

== Roster ==
1972–73 Illinois State Redbirds men's basketball team
Players
Coaches

Pos.	#	Name	Height	Weight	Year	Hometown
G	20	Doug Collins	6 ft 6 in (1.98 m)	180 lb (82 kg)	Sr	Benton, IL
G	13	Dan Witt	5 ft 11 in (1.8 m)	170 lb (77 kg)	Sr	Maple Park, IL
F	44	Stepney Bacon	6 ft 9 in (2.06 m)	215 lb (98 kg)	Jr	Detroit, MI
C	24	Ron deVries	6 ft 11 in (2.11 m)	220 lb (100 kg)	Jr	Detroit, MI
C	25	Clarence Weaver	6 ft 8 in (2.03 m)	200 lb (91 kg)	Jr	St. Louis, MO
C	33	Calvin Harper	6 ft 7 in (2.01 m)	230 lb (104 kg)	So	Detroit, MI
F	11	Darrell Jeter	6 ft 7 in (2.01 m)	200 lb (91 kg)	So	Detroit, MI
F		Jeff Jones (I)	6 ft 7 in (2.01 m)	210 lb (95 kg)	So	Joliet, IL
G	10	Rick Meeks	6 ft 0 in (1.83 m)	160 lb (73 kg)	So	Centralia, IL
C	32	Steve Nelson	6 ft 10 in (2.08 m)	245 lb (111 kg)	So	Battle Creek, MI
G		Eric Scott	6 ft 2 in (1.88 m)	192 lb (87 kg)	So	Folsom, PA
G	22	Rick Whitlow	6 ft 2 in (1.88 m)	180 lb (82 kg)	So	Michigan City, IN
G	23	Mike Bonczyk	5 ft 11 in (1.8 m)	170 lb (77 kg)	Fr	South Holland, IL
G	15	Calvin Brawley	6 ft 2 in (1.88 m)	175 lb (79 kg)	Fr	Leighton, AL
G	21	Robert Hawkins	6 ft 3 in (1.91 m)	190 lb (86 kg)	Fr	Detroit, MI
F	35	Richard Jones	6 ft 3 in (1.91 m)	190 lb (86 kg)	Fr	York, AL
F	43	Roger Powell	6 ft 5 in (1.96 m)	200 lb (91 kg)	Fr	Joliet, IL

Head coach

- Will Robinson (West Virginia State)

Assistant coach(es)

- Warren Crews (Southeast Missouri State)
- John Parker (Detroit Mercy)
- Gene Smithson (North Central (IL))

Legend

- (C) Team captain
- (S) Suspended
- (I) Ineligible
- (W) Walk-on
- Injured
- Current redshirt

Roster
Last update: January 20, 2021

== Schedule ==
Date time, TV	Rank^{#}	Opponent^{#}	Result	Record	High points	High rebounds	High assists	Site (attendance) city, state
Exhibition season
November 13, 1972*; 7:30 pm		Chilean National Team	W 100–54		23 – Collins	–	–	Horton Field House (4,000); Normal, IL
Regular season
November 30, 1972*		Central Missouri State	W 119–67	1–0	21 – Collins	12 – deVries	–	Horton Field House; Normal, IL
December 2, 1972*		at Dayton	L 75–81	1–1	23 – Collins	11 – deVries	–	University of Dayton Arena (12,594); Dayton, OH
December 6, 1972*		at Arkansas	W 81–67	2–1	23 – Collins	–	–	John Barnhill Arena; Fayetteville, AR
December 9, 1972*		Buffalo	W 84–70	3–1	21 – Collins	15 – deVries	–	Horton Field House; Normal, IL
December 13, 1972*		Winona State	W 118–70	4–1	–	–	–	Horton Field House; Normal, IL
December 16, 1972*		at Southwest Missouri State	L 68–71	4–2	–	–	–	McDonald Arena (3,288); Springfield, MO
December 23, 1972*		San Diego State	W 99–82	5–2	–	–	–	Horton Field House; Normal, IL
December 27, 1972*		at Pacific	L 64–73	5–3	–	–	–	Pacific Pavilion; Stockton, CA
December 29, 1972*		at California	L 72–82	5–4	–	–	–	Harmon Gym; Berkeley, CA
January 3, 1973*		Louisiana State–New Orleans	W 103–98 ^{OT}	6–4	57 – Collins	–	–	Horton Field House; Normal, IL
January 6, 1973*		at Ball State	L 75–92	6–5	22 – Collins	–	–	Irving Gymnasium; Muncie, IN
January 8, 1973*		vs. Morehead State	W 107–91	7–5	30 – Powell	–	–	Nassau Coliseum; Uniondale, NY
January 13, 1973*		Southern Illinois	W 73–56	8–5	22 – Collins	22 – deVries	–	Horton Field House; Normal, IL
January 20, 1973*		Pacific	W 95–56	9–5	–	–	–	Horton Field House; Normal, IL
January 27, 1973*		MacMurray	W 137–72	10–5	–	–	–	Horton Field House; Normal, IL
January 30, 1973*		at Central Michigan	L 82–84	10–6	–	–	–	Ronald W Finch Fieldhouse; Mount Pleasnt, MI
February 2, 1973*		at Northern Illinois	L 88–92 ^{OT}	10–7	22 – Collins	19 – deVries	–	Chick Evans Field House (4,564); DeKalb, IL
February 7, 1973*		Indiana State	W 94–79	11–7	30 – Collins	–	–	Horton Field House; Normal, IL
February 9, 1973*		Ball State	L 86–94	11–8	30 – Collins	11 – Bacon	–	Horton Field House; Normal, IL
February 10, 1973*			cancelled					Chicago Stadium; Chicago, IL
February 14, 1973*		at Oral Roberts	L 96–111	11–9	41 – Collins	–	–	Mabee Center; Tulsa, OK
February 16, 1973*		at No. 13 Jacksonville	L 86–95	11–10	30 – Hawkins	12 – Harper	–	Jacksonville Veterans Memorial Coliseum; Jacksonville, FL
February 21, 1973*		at Southern Illinois	L 71–81	11–11	28 – Collins	15 – deVries	–	SIU Arena; Carbondale, IL
February 24, 1973*		Northern Illinois	W 91–84	12–11	28 – Collins	17 – Harper	–	Horton Field House (8,250); Normal, IL
February 28, 1973*		Western Illinois	W 93–73	13–11	39 – Collins	18 – deVries	–	Horton Field House; Normal, IL
March 3, 1973*		at Indiana State	L 71–76	13–12	–	21 – deVries	–	Indiana State College Arena; Terre Haute, IN
*Non-conference game. ^{#}Rankings from AP Poll. (#) Tournament seedings in parentheses. All times are in Central Standard Time.
