= 1972–73 Washington Huskies men's basketball team =

American college basketball season

1972–73 Washington Huskies men's basketball
- Conference: Pacific-8 Conference
- Record: 16–11 (6–8 Pac-8)
- Head coach: Marv Harshman (2nd season)
- Home arena: Hec Edmundson Pavilion

1972–73 Pacific-8 Conference men's basketball standings
	Conf.				Overall
Team	W		L	PCT	W		L	PCT
No. 1 UCLA	14	–	0	1.000	30	–	0	1.000
USC	9	–	5	.643	18	–	10	.643
Oregon	8	–	6	.571	16	–	10	.615
Stanford	7	–	7	.500	14	–	11	.560
Washington	6	–	8	.429	16	–	11	.593
Oregon State	6	–	8	.429	15	–	11	.577
California	4	–	10	.286	11	–	15	.423
Washington State	2	–	12	.143	6	–	20	.231
Rankings from AP Poll

The 1972–73 Washington Huskies men's basketball team represented the University of Washington for the 1972–73 NCAA college basketball season. Led by second-year head coach Marv Harshman, the Huskies were members of the Pacific-8 Conference and played their home games on campus at Hec Edmundson Pavilion in Seattle, Washington.

The Huskies were 16–11 overall in the regular season and 6–8 in conference play, tied for fifth in the standings.
