= 1972–73 Drexel Dragons men's basketball team =

American college basketball season

1972–73 Drexel Dragons men's basketball
- Conference: Middle Atlantic Conferences
- University–Eastern
- Record: 14–7 (2–4 MAC)
- Head coach: Ray Haesler (2nd season)
- MVP: Mike Fee
- Home arena: 32nd Street Armory

1972–73 MAC men's basketball standings
	Conf.				Overall
Team	W		L	PCT	W		L	PCT
University–Eastern
Saint Joseph's †	6	–	0	1.000	22	–	6	.786
Temple	5	–	1	.833	17	–	10	.630
American	4	–	2	.667	21	–	4	.840
La Salle	3	–	3	.500	15	–	10	.600
Drexel	2	–	4	.333	14	–	7	.667
Hofstra	1	–	5	.167	8	–	16	.333
West Chester	0	–	6	.000	5	–	21	.192
University–Western
Lafayette	7	–	3	.700	16	–	10	.615
Gettysburg	6	–	4	.600	14	–	11	.560
Delaware	6	–	4	.600	14	–	11	.560
Bucknell	6	–	4	.600	11	–	14	.440
Lehigh	3	–	7	.300	8	–	17	.320
Rider	2	–	8	.200	12	–	14	.462
† 1973 MAC men's basketball tournament winner Rankings from AP Poll

The 1972–73 Drexel Dragons men's basketball team represented Drexel University during the 1972–73 men's basketball season. The Dragons, led by 2nd year head coach Ray Haesler, played their home games at the 32nd Street Armory and were members of the University–Eastern division of the Middle Atlantic Conferences (MAC).

The team finished the season 14–7, and finished in 5th place in the MAC University–Eastern Division in the regular season.

== Roster ==
1972–73 Drexel Dragons men's basketball team
Players	Coaches
Pos. / # / Name / Height / Weight / Year / Previous school / Hometown; / / / — / —	Head coach: Ray Haesler (Rider); Assistant coach(es) Legend: (C) Team captain; (S) Suspended; (I) Ineligible; (W) Walk-on; Injured; Current redshirt

== Schedule ==
Date time, TV	Rank^{#}	Opponent^{#}	Result	Record	High points	High rebounds	High assists	Site (attendance) city, state
Regular season
December 2, 1972		at American	L 78–86	0–1 (0–1)	–	–	–	
Unknown*		Widener	W 69–40	1–1	–	–	–	
Unknown*		Glassboro State	W 62–51	2–1	–	–	–	32nd Street Armory; Philadelphia, PA
Unknown*		vs. Trenton State; Governor's Classic semifinal	W 67–65	3–1	–	–	–	Lawrenceville, NJ
Unknown*		vs. Philadelphia Textile; Governor's Classic championship	L 68–76 ^{OT}	3–2	–	–	–	Lawrenceville, NJ
Unknown*		at Muhlenberg	W 78–65	4–2	–	–	–	
Unknown		at West Chester	W 60–47	5–2 (1–1)	–	–	–	
January 9, 1973*		Swarthmore	W 82–63	6–2	–	–	–	32nd Street Armory; Philadelphia, PA
January 13, 1973		vs. Saint Joseph's	L 53–68	6–3 (1–2)	–	–	–	Palestra (3,692); Philadelphia, PA
Unknown*		at Lehigh	W 78–66	7–3	–	–	–	
January 20, 1973*		Gettysburg	L 62–71	7–4	–	–	–	32nd Street Armory; Philadelphia, PA
Unknown		Hofstra	W 79–64	8–4 (2–2)	–	–	–	
Unknown*		Rider	W 62–56	9–4	–	–	–	
February 3, 1973*		at Johns Hopkins	W 84–70	10–4	–	–	–	
Unknown		Temple	L 63–97	10–5 (2–3)	–	–	–	
February 12, 1973; 8:00 pm		La Salle	L 57–72	10–6 (2–4)	–	–	–	32nd Street Armory; Philadelphia, PA
Unknown*		Ursinus	W 83–56	11–6	–	–	–	
February 17, 1973*		Franklin & Marshall	W 94–71	12–6	–	–	–	32nd Street Armory; Philadelphia, PA
Unknown*		Philadelphia Textile	L 66–73	12–7	–	–	–	
Unknown*		at Albright	W 69–58	13–7	–	–	–	
Unknown*		Delaware	W 71–61	14–7	–	–	–	
*Non-conference game. ^{#}Rankings from AP. (#) Tournament seedings in parentheses. All times are in Eastern Time.

== Awards ==
Mike Fee

- MAC All-Conference Honorable Mention
- AP All-Pennsylvania Honorable Mention

Greg Newman

- MAC All-Conference Honorable Mention
- AP All-Pennsylvania Honorable Mention
