= Frank Mulzoff =

American basketball player and coach (1928–2017)

Personal information
- Born: August 5, 1928 Queens, New York, U.S.
- Died: November 30, 2017 (aged 89) Florida, U.S.
- Listed height: 6 ft 3 in (1.91 m)

Career information
- High school: Bishop Loughlin Memorial (Brooklyn, New York)
- College: St. John's (1948–1951)
- Position: Forward

Career history

Coaching
- 1968–1970: St. John's (assistant)
- 1970–1973: St. John's
- 1973–1974: Cherry Hill Rookies
- 1977–1978: Long Island Ducks
- 1985: Long Island Knights

Career highlights
- As coach: St. Joseph's University Hall of Fame (2008)

Frank Mulzoff (August 5, 1928 – November 30, 2017) was an American college basketball player and head coach, both for the St. John's Redmen men's basketball team.

== College playing career ==
As a 6'3" forward, Mulzoff played basketball collegiately at St. John's University for three seasons when it was located in Brooklyn, New York. Along with Al McGuire, he was co-captain of the varsity team as a senior during the 1950-1951 season, and helped lead the team to a 26-5 record, a berth in the NCAA Division I men's basketball tournament, and third place in the National Invitational Tournament.

== Coaching career ==
After his college playing career ended, Mulzoff coached high school basketball teams for many years. He became assistant basketball coach at St. John's, which by then had moved to Queens, New York, and was then elevated to head coach in 1970 when Lou Carnesecca left to coach the New York Nets, leading the team to two appearances in the National Invitational Tournament and one NCAA tournament in his three seasons. He resigned after the 1972-1973 season, and was replaced by Carnesecca, who returned from the Nets. Mulzoff then became head coach of the Cherry Hill Rookies of the Eastern Basketball Association and afterward continued to coach at high school, college, and minor league professional levels.

== Head coaching record ==
=== NCAA Division 1 ===
Record table
Season	Team	Overall	Conference	Standing	Postseason
St. John's Redmen (Independent) (1970–1973)
1970–71	St. John's	18–9			NIT First Round
1971–72	St. John's	19–11			NIT Fourth Place
1972–73	St. John's	19–7			NCAA University Division First Round
St. John's:		56–27 (.675)			
Total:					

=== Minor League Professional Basketball Teams ===
Season	Team	Record	League	Standing	Postseason
1973–1974	Cherry Hill Rookies	0-6 (started season, coached 6 games)	Eastern Basketball Association	4th place, Eastern Division	did not qualify
1977–1978	Long Island Ducks	15-15	Eastern Basketball Association	2nd place, Eastern Division	lost in first round
1985	Long Island Knights	9-15	United States Basketball League	5th (tie)	—
