= 1972–73 St. John's Redmen basketball team =

American college basketball season

1972–73 St. John's Redmen men's basketball

ECAC Holiday Festival Champions

1973 NCAA Tournament, First Round
- Conference: Independent
- Record: 19–7
- Head coach: Frank Mulzoff
- Assistant coaches: Chuck McAuley; Joel de Angelis
- Captain: Bill Schaeffer
- Home arena: Alumni Hall; Madison Square Garden

1972–73 NCAA University Division men's basketball independents standings
	Conf.				Overall
Team	W		L	PCT	W		L	PCT
No. 4 Providence		–		–	27	–	4	.871
No. 5 Marquette		–		–	27	–	4	.871
No. 13 Houston		–		–	23	–	4	.852
No. 14 Syracuse		–		–	24	–	5	.828
Virginia Tech		–		–	22	–	5	.815
Jacksonville		–		–	21	–	6	.778
Oklahoma City		–		–	21	–	6	.778
Oral Roberts		–		–	21	–	6	.778
South Carolina		–		–	22	–	7	.759
Marshall		–		–	20	–	7	.741
Northeastern		–		–	19	–	7	.731
St. John's		–		–	19	–	7	.731
Centenary		–		–	19	–	8	.704
Florida State		–		–	18	–	8	.692
Northern Illinois		–		–	17	–	8	.680
Duquesne		–		–	16	–	8	.667
Fairfield		–		–	18	–	9	.667
Cincinnati		–		–	17	–	9	.654
Denver		–		–	17	–	9	.654
George Washington		–		–	17	–	9	.654
Penn State		–		–	15	–	8	.652
Detroit		–		–	16	–	9	.640
Hardin–Simmons		–		–	16	–	9	.640
Indiana State		–		–	16	–	10	.615
Manhattan		–		–	16	–	10	.615
Utah State		–		–	16	–	10	.615
Notre Dame		–		–	18	–	12	.600
Air Force		–		–	14	–	10	.583
Creighton		–		–	15	–	11	.577
Hawaii		–		–	15	–	11	.577
Rutgers		–		–	15	–	11	.577
Stetson		–		–	15	–	11	.577
DePaul		–		–	14	–	11	.560
South Alabama		–		–	14	–	11	.560
Trinity (TX)		–		–	14	–	11	.560
Canisius		–		–	13	–	11	.542
Butler		–		–	14	–	12	.538
Charlotte		–		–	14	–	12	.538
Illinois State		–		–	13	–	12	.520
Long Island		–		–	13	–	12	.520
Navy		–		–	13	–	12	.520
Dayton		–		–	13	–	13	.500
Fairleigh Dickinson		–		–	13	–	13	.500
St. Bonaventure		–		–	13	–	13	.500
Portland State		–		–	12	–	12	.500
Georgetown		–		–	12	–	14	.462
Pittsburgh		–		–	12	–	14	.462
Tulane		–		–	12	–	14	.462
Army		–		–	11	–	13	.458
Boston College		–		–	11	–	14	.440
Colgate		–		–	11	–	14	.440
Villanova		–		–	11	–	14	.440
Fordham		–		–	12	–	16	.429
Southern Illinois		–		–	11	–	15	.423
West Virginia		–		–	10	–	15	.400
Cleveland State		–		–	9	–	14	.391
Ball State		–		–	9	–	15	.375
Niagara		–		–	9	–	16	.360
Loyola (IL)		–		–	8	–	15	.348
Holy Cross		–		–	9	–	17	.346
Southern Miss		–		–	8	–	16	.333
St. Francis (NY)		–		–	8	–	16	.333
Portland		–		–	9	–	19	.321
Seton Hall		–		–	8	–	17	.320
Georgia Southern		–		–	8	–	18	.308
Saint Peter's		–		–	8	–	18	.308
Georgia Tech		–		–	7	–	18	.280
Iona		–		–	6	–	16	.273
Samford		–		–	5	–	20	.200
Saint Francis (PA)		–		–	5	–	21	.192
Pan American		–		–	4	–	22	.154
Xavier		–		–	3	–	23	.115
Rankings from AP Poll

The 1972–73 St. John's Redmen basketball team represented St. John's University during the 1972–73 NCAA University Division men's basketball season. The team was coached by Frank Mulzoff in his third year at the school. St. John's home games are played at Alumni Hall and Madison Square Garden.

The Redmen qualified for the NCAA tournament, where they lost to Pennsylvania in the first round.

== Roster ==
1972–73 St. John's Red Storm men's basketball team
Players
Coaches

Pos.	#	Name	Height	Weight	Year	Previous school	Hometown
G	-	Terry McCormack (redshirt)	6 ft 6 in (1.98 m)	—	Jr	St. Johns Prep/Hofstra	New Hyde Park, NY
F	-	Dennis McIntyre	6 ft 3 in (1.91 m)	—	RS Jr	Monsignor McClancy/Nassau	Bayside, NY
G	5	Frank Alagia	5 ft 9 in (1.75 m)	—	Fr	St. Agnes (NY)	Rockville Centre, NY
G	10	Larry Jenkins	5 ft 11 in (1.8 m)	—	Sr	Andrew Jackson	Queens Village, NY
G/F	11	Beaver Smith	6 ft 4 in (1.93 m)	—	Fr	South Side	Rockville Centre, NY
G	12	Kevin Raftery	6 ft 2 in (1.88 m)	—	Sr	Archbishop Molloy	Briarwood, NJ
G/F	15	Billy Schaeffer (C)	6 ft 5 in (1.96 m)	—	Sr	Holy Cross	Bellerose, NY
G	30	Mel Utley	6 ft 3 in (1.91 m)	—	So	Far Rockaway	Far Rockaway, NY
F	33	Mel Davis (injured)	6 ft 6 in (1.98 m)	—	Sr	Boys	Brooklyn, NY
F/C	34	Ed Searcy	6 ft 6 in (1.98 m)	—	RS Jr	Power Memorial/Duquesne	New York, NY
G	35	Kevin Cluess	6 ft 4 in (1.93 m)	—	So	Archbishop Molloy	West Hempstead, NY
F	55	Tony Prince	6 ft 9 in (2.06 m)	—	Sr	Bishop Loughlin	South Ozone Park, NY

Head coach

- Frank Mulzoff (St. John's '51)

Assistant coach(es)

- Chuck McAuley
- Joel de Angelis

Legend

- (C) Team captain
- (S) Suspended
- (I) Ineligible
- (W) Walk-on
- Injured
- Current redshirt

== Schedule and results ==
Date time, TV	Rank^{#}	Opponent^{#}	Result	Record	Site city, state
Regular Season
12/02/72*		at Hofstra	W 93-78	1-0	Physical Fitness Center; Hempstead, NY
12/09/72*		Georgetown	W 108-69	2-0	Alumni Hall; Queens, NY
12/12/72*		Rhode Island	W 85-75	3-0	Alumni Hall; Queens, NY
12/16/72*		at American	L 75-79	3-1	Fort Myer Ceremonial Hall; Washington, D.C.
12/20/72*		Boston College	L 95-96 ^{OT}	3-2	Alumni Hall; Queens, NY
12/26/72*		vs. Grambling; ECAC Holiday Festival First Round	W 112-86	4-2	Alumni Hall; Queens, NY
12/27/72*		vs. Tennessee; ECAC Holiday Festival Quarterfinal	L 56-85	5-2	Madison Square Garden; New York, NY
12/28/72*		vs. Michigan; ECAC Holiday Festival Semifinal	W 85-83	6-2	Madison Square Garden; New York, NY
12/30/72*		vs. South Carolina; ECAC Holiday Festival Championship	W 86-79	7-2	Madison Square Garden; New York, NY
01/06/73*		at Davidson	W 78-77	8-2	Charlotte Coliseum; Charlotte, NC
01/13/73*	No. 18	St. Francis (NY)	W 93-72	9-2	Alumni Hall; Queens, NY
01/17/73*	No. 17	Clemson	W 87-59	10-2	Alumni Hall; Queens, NY
01/20/73*	No. 17	Temple	W 93-84	11-2	Alumni Hall; Queens, NY
01/24/73*	No. 15	at Seton Hall	W 107-77	12-2	Walsh Gymnasium; South Orange, NJ
01/27/73*	No. 15	Dartmouth	W 106-66	13-2	Alumni Hall; Queens, NY
01/30/73*	No. 14	at Villanova	W 87-77	14-2	Villanova Field House; Villanova, PA
02/03/73*	No. 14	at Army	W 80-70	15-2	USMA Fieldhouse; West Point, NY
02/08/73*	No. 14	Niagara	W 74-69	16-2	Alumni Hall; Queens, NY
02/10/73*	No. 14	at Fordham	W 98-73	17-2	Madison Square Garden; New York, NY
02/14/73*	No. 9	at Syracuse	L 70-80	17-3	Manley Field House; Syracuse, NY
02/17/73*	No. 9	Dayton	W 98-83	18-3	Alumni Hall; Queens, NY
02/21/73*	No. 11	at St. Joseph's	L 65-76	18-4	The Palestra; Philadelphia, PA
02/24/73*	No. 11	Notre Dame	L 71-75	18-5	Nassau Coliseum; Uniondale, NY
02/27/73*	No. 17	at Holy Cross	W 108-90	19-5	Worcester Auditorium; Worcester, MA
03/03/73*	No. 11	No. 6 Providence	L 90-93	19-6	Alumni Hall; Queens, NY
NCAA Tournament
03/10/73*		vs. Pennsylvania; NCAA Regional Quarterfinal	L 61-62	19-7	William & Mary Hall; Williamsburg, VA
*Non-conference game. ^{#}Rankings from AP Poll. (#) Tournament seedings in parentheses.

== Team players drafted into the NBA ==
Round	Pick	Player	NBA club
1	14	Mel Davis	New York Knicks
2	23	Billy Schaeffer	Los Angeles Lakers
17	203	Tony Prince	Philadelphia 76ers
