= 1972–73 Washington State Cougars men's basketball team =

American college basketball season

1972–73 Washington State Cougars men's basketball
- Conference: Pacific-8
- Record: 6–20 (2–12 Pac-8)
- Head coach: George Raveling (1st season)
- Home arena: Bohler Gymnasium

1972–73 Pacific-8 Conference men's basketball standings
	Conf.				Overall
Team	W		L	PCT	W		L	PCT
No. 1 UCLA	14	–	0	1.000	30	–	0	1.000
USC	9	–	5	.643	18	–	10	.643
Oregon	8	–	6	.571	16	–	10	.615
Stanford	7	–	7	.500	14	–	11	.560
Washington	6	–	8	.429	16	–	11	.593
Oregon State	6	–	8	.429	15	–	11	.577
California	4	–	10	.286	11	–	15	.423
Washington State	2	–	12	.143	6	–	20	.231
Rankings from AP Poll

The 1972–73 Washington State Cougars men's basketball team represented Washington State University for the 1972–73 NCAA college basketball season. Led by first-year head coach George Raveling, the Cougars were members of the Pacific-8 Conference and played their home games on campus at Bohler Gymnasium in Pullman, Washington.

The Cougars were 6–20 overall in the regular season and 2–12 in conference play, last in the standings. The two conference wins were both at home: Stanford in early January in Raveling's Pac-8 debut, and Oregon State in March. This was the last season for varsity basketball at Bohler Gym; the Performing Arts Center (now Beasley Coliseum) opened in June 1973.

Raveling was hired in April 1972; he was previously an assistant at Maryland under Lefty Driesell, and led the Cougar program for eleven seasons.
