= 1972–73 Kentucky Wildcats men's basketball team =

1972–73 season of University of Kentucky men's basketball team

1972–73 Kentucky Wildcats men's basketball

SEC regular season champions

NCAA Tournament, Regional Finals
- Conference: Southeastern Conference

Ranking
- Coaches: No. 15
- AP: No. 17
- Record: 20–8 (14–4 SEC)
- Head coach: Joe B. Hall (1st season)
- Assistant coaches: Dick Parsons; Boyd Grant; Jim Hatfield
- Home arena: Memorial Coliseum

The 1972–73 Kentucky Wildcats men's basketball team represented the University of Kentucky in the 1972–73 college basketball season. The team's head coach was Joe B. Hall, who was in his first season, taking over for Adolph Rupp. They played their home games at Memorial Coliseum and were members of the Southeastern Conference. Kentucky finished with an overall record of 20–8 (14–4 SEC) and were invited to the 1973 NCAA Tournament. The Wildcats opened with a 106–100 win over Austin Peay in overtime. But lost in the Regional Final to 1972–73 Indiana 72–65.
