= Bohler Gymnasium =

Arena in Pullman, Washington

- "Bohler Gym"
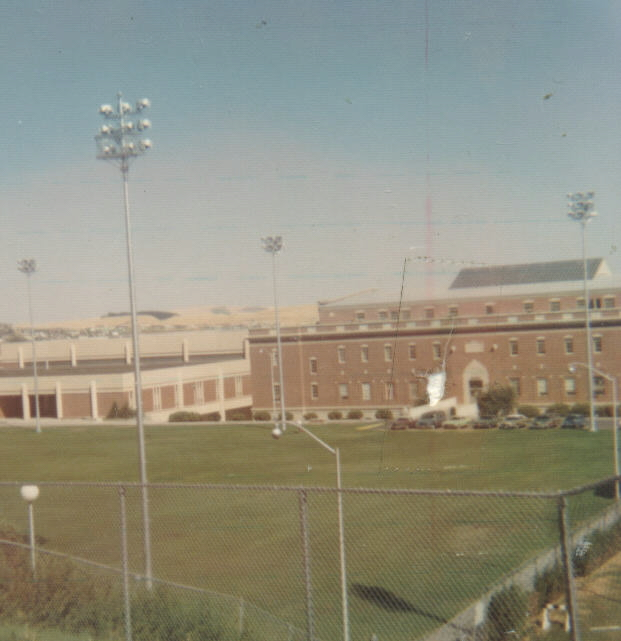
- Interactive map of Bohler Gymnasium
- Former names: Washington State College Gymnasium (1928–1946)
- Location: Washington State University; Pullman, Washington, U.S.
- Coordinates: 46.733°N 117.162°W
- Owner: Washington State University
- Operator: Washington State University
- Capacity: 3,000 (2000–present); 5,600 (1928)
- Surface: hardwood

Construction
- Built: 1927–28
- Opened: 1928, 98 years ago
- Renovated: 2000
- Architect: Stanley Smith

Tenants
- Washington State Cougars (NCAA) men's basketball (1928–1973) women's volleyball (197x–present)

Pullman (the United States)
Pullman (Washington (state))

Bohler Gymnasium is a 3,000 seat multi-purpose arena on the campus of Washington State University in Pullman, Washington. Opened 98 years ago in 1928 and located directly northwest of Rogers Field (now the site of Martin Stadium), it was home to the Cougar basketball teams through March 1973, as the new Beasley Coliseum opened that June. A power outage at Beasley in January 1987 forced it back into service for a conference game against Arizona.

Named after longtime head coach and athletic director Fred Bohler (1885–1960) in October 1946, it was refurbished in 2000 and is currently the home venue of Cougar volleyball. The only volleyball specific venue in the Pac-12.

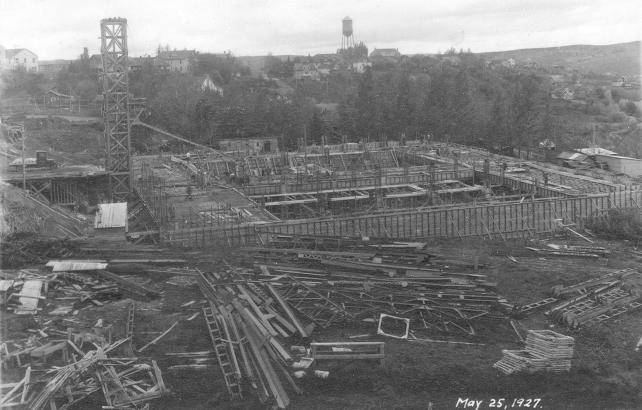
The gymnasium under construction in 1927

When the gym hosted the Pacific Coast Conference championship series in March 1941, its capacity was 5,600; it was estimated at 5,000 in the early 1970s.
