= 1972–73 NCAA University Division men's basketball rankings =

- Season: 1972–73
- NCAA Tournament: 1973
- Preseason No. 1: UCLA
- NCAA Tournament Champions: UCLA
NCAA University Division men's basketball rankings


The 1972–73 NCAA University Division men's basketball rankings was made up of two human polls, the AP Poll and the Coaches Poll, in addition to various other preseason polls.

== Legend ==
	Increase in ranking
	Decrease in ranking
	New to rankings from previous week
Italics	Number of first place votes
(#–#)	Win–loss record
т	Tied with team above or below also with this symbol

== AP Poll ==
	Preseason	Week 1 Dec. 4	Week 2 Dec. 11	Week 3 Dec. 18	Week 4 Dec. 26	Week 5 Jan. 2	Week 6 Jan. 8	Week 7 Jan. 15	Week 8 Jan. 22	Week 9 Jan. 29	Week 10 Feb. 5	Week 11 Feb. 12	Week 12 Feb. 19	Week 13 Feb. 26	Week 14 Mar. 5	Final Mar. 12	
1.	UCLA	UCLA (3–0)	UCLA (3–0)	UCLA (4–0)	UCLA (6–0)	UCLA (8–0)	UCLA (10–0)	UCLA (12–0)	UCLA (14–0)	UCLA (16–0)	UCLA (17–0)	UCLA (18–0)	UCLA (21–0)	UCLA (23–0)	UCLA (25–0)	UCLA (26–0)	1.
2.	Florida State	Florida State (1–0)	Florida State (3–0)	Maryland (4–0)	Maryland (5–0)	Maryland (7–0)	Maryland (9–0)	NC State (12–0)	NC State (12–0)	NC State (14–0)	NC State (16–0)	NC State (19–0)	NC State (21–0)	NC State (23–0)	NC State (25–0)	NC State (27–0)	2.
3.	Maryland	Maryland (2–0)	Maryland (3–0)	Marquette (4–0)	Marquette (5–0)	Marquette (8–0)	NC State (9–0)	Maryland (10–1)	North Carolina (15–1)	Maryland (14–1)	Long Beach State (17–1)	Long Beach State (19–1)	Long Beach State (20–1)	Minnesota (18–2)	Minnesota (20–2)	Long Beach State (24–2)	3.
4.	Minnesota	Minnesota (2–0)	Marquette (3–0)	NC State (6–0)	NC State (8–0)	NC State (8–0)	Marquette (10–0)	North Carolina (13–1)	Maryland (12–1)	Long Beach State (16–1)	Indiana (14–2)	Minnesota (15–2)	Minnesota (16–2)	Long Beach State (22–2)	Long Beach State (24–2)	Providence (23–2)	4.
5.	Marquette	Marquette (1–0)	Minnesota (3–0)	Minnesota (4–0)	Minnesota (6–0)	Long Beach State (11–0)	Missouri (11–0)	Long Beach State (13–1)	Long Beach State (15–1)	Indiana (13–2)	Minnesota (14–2)	Marquette (18–2)	Marquette (20–2)	Marquette (22–2)	Providence (22–2)	Marquette (23–3)	5.
6.	Long Beach State	NC State (2–0)	NC State (4–0)	Long Beach State (4–0)	Long Beach State (8–0)	Minnesota (9–0)	Long Beach State (11–1)	Minnesota (10–1)	Indiana (11–2)	Alabama (13–1)	North Carolina (16–3)	North Carolina (18–4)	North Carolina (20–4)	Providence (21–2)	Marquette (22–3)	Indiana (19–5)	6.
7.	Southwestern Louisiana	Long Beach State (1–0)	Long Beach State (3–0)	Florida State (4–1)	Missouri (8–0)	Missouri (10–0)	North Carolina (12–1)	Marquette (11–1)	Missouri (13–2)	Missouri (14–2)	Marquette (16–2)	Houston (17–2)	Providence (18–2)	North Carolina (21–5)	Houston (22–3)	Southwestern Louisiana (23–3)	7.
8.	NC State	Kentucky (1–0)	Southwestern Louisiana (4–0)	Southwestern Louisiana (6–0)	Penn (5–0)	Southwestern Louisiana (6–0)	Minnesota (9–1)	Missouri (12–1)	Minnesota (11–2)	North Carolina (15–3)	Missouri (15–2)	Providence (16–2)	Maryland (17–4)	Houston (20–3)	North Carolina (22–6)	Maryland (22–6)	8.
9.	Penn	Penn (1–0)	Penn (3–0)	Indiana (5–0)	Southwestern Louisiana (6–0)	North Carolina (10–1)	Vanderbilt (10–1)	Providence (10–1)	Alabama (10–1)	Minnesota (12–2)	Maryland (14–3)	St. John's (17–2)	Houston (18–3)	Maryland (19–4)	Indiana (18–5)	Kansas State (22–4)	9.
10.	Ohio State	Southwestern Louisiana (1–0)	Oral Roberts (2–0)	Missouri (7–0)	Vanderbilt (8–0)	Houston (8–2)	Houston (10–2)	San Francisco (12–1)	Marquette (12–2)	Marquette (14–2)	Alabama (14–2)	Maryland (16–3)	Indiana (15–5)	Memphis State (21–4)	Maryland (20–5)	Minnesota (20–4)	10.
11.	Memphis State	Memphis State (1–0)	North Carolina (4–0)	Penn (4–0)	North Carolina (7–1)	Vanderbilt (8–1)	Providence (7–1)	Alabama (8–1)	Houston (12–2)	Houston (13–2)	Houston (15–2)	Indiana (14–4)	St. John's (18–3)	Southwestern Louisiana (22–2)	Kansas State (21–4)	North Carolina (22–7)	11.
12.	BYU	Oral Roberts (0–0)	Missouri (5–0)	Vanderbilt (7–0)	Florida State (5–2)	San Francisco (8–1)	San Francisco (10–1)	Houston (11–2)	Southwestern Louisiana (12–1)	Providence (12–2)	Providence (14–2)	Missouri (16–3)	Southwestern Louisiana (19–2)	Indiana (17–5)	Missouri (20–4)	Memphis State (21–5)	12.
13.	Kentucky	North Carolina (2–0)	Vanderbilt (5–0)	North Carolina (6–1)	Houston (7–1)	Providence (5–1)	Southwestern Louisiana (7–1)	Southwestern Louisiana (10–1)	Jacksonville (13–2)	Southwestern Louisiana (13–1)	Southwestern Louisiana (16–1)	Jacksonville (18–3)	Kansas State (18–3)	Missouri (18–4)	Syracuse (22–4)	Houston (22–3)	13.
14.	Tennessee	Tennessee (1–0)	Providence (1–0)	Houston (7–1)	BYU (6–1)	Alabama (5–1)	Alabama (7–1)	Kansas State (11–2)	Providence (10–2)	St. John's (13–2)	St. John's (15–2)	Southwestern Louisiana (18–2)	Memphis State (19–4)	Syracuse (20–4)	Southwestern Louisiana (22–3)	Syracuse (22–4)	14.
15.	Houston	Ohio State (1–1)	Indiana (3–0)	BYU (5–1)	Indiana (5–1)	BYU (8–2)	Jacksonville (10–2)	Jacksonville (11–2)	St. John's (11–2)	Jacksonville (14–3)	Memphis State (16–3)	Kansas State (16–3)	New Mexico (21–3)	New Mexico (23–4)	Memphis State (21–5)	Missouri (21–5)	15.
16.	South Carolina	Kansas State (2–0)	Houston (5–1)	Oral Roberts (4–1)	Kansas State (7–1)	New Mexico (9–0)	Indiana (8–2)	Indiana (10–2)	San Francisco (12–2)	San Francisco (14–2)	Jacksonville (16–3)	Memphis State (17–4)	Missouri (17–4)	Kansas State (19–4)	Jacksonville (21–5)	Arizona State (18–7)	16.
17.	Kansas State	USC (1–0)	BYU (3–1)	Kansas State (6–1)	Providence (5–1)	Penn (5–2)	Kansas State (9–2)	St. John's (9–2)	Memphis State (12–3)	Memphis State (14–3)	San Francisco (16–2)	Alabama (14–4)	Purdue (14–5)	St. John's (18–5)	St. John's (19–6)	Kentucky (19–7)	17.
18.	Oral Roberts	Michigan (1–0)	Michigan (3–1)	Providence (3–1)	Alabama (3–1)	Kansas State (9–2)	St. John's (8–2) т	Vanderbilt (10–3)	Kansas State (11–3)	Kansas State (13–3)	Kansas State (14–3)	New Mexico (18–3)	Alabama (16–4)	Jacksonville (20–5)	Saint Joseph's (22–5)	Penn (20–5)	18.
19.	Michigan	Providence (0–0)	Memphis State (7–2)	Oklahoma (6–0)	Oklahoma (6–0)	Florida State (7–3)	Florida State (8–3) т	Florida State (10–3)	New Mexico (15–2)	Oral Roberts (15–2)	Oral Roberts (16–3)	Virginia Tech (14–3)	Virginia Tech (15–4)	South Carolina (18–5)	Kentucky (18–7)	Austin Peay (22–5)	19.
20.	USC т Louisville т	Houston (3–1)	Kansas State (3–1)	Santa Clara (4–2)	San Francisco (7–1)	Indiana (6–2)	Louisville (10–2)	Louisville (11–2)	Purdue (10–3)	USC (13–4)	New Mexico (16–3)	BYU (17–4)	Jacksonville (19–4)	Purdue (15–6)	San Francisco (21–4)	San Francisco (22–4)	20.
	Preseason	Week 1 Dec. 4	Week 2 Dec. 11	Week 3 Dec. 18	Week 4 Dec. 26	Week 5 Jan. 2	Week 6 Jan. 8	Week 7 Jan. 15	Week 8 Jan. 22	Week 9 Jan. 29	Week 10 Feb. 5	Week 11 Feb. 12	Week 12 Feb. 19	Week 13 Feb. 26	Week 14 Mar. 5	Final Mar. 12	
		Dropped: BYU; South Carolina; Louisville	Dropped: Kentucky; Tennessee; Ohio State; USC	Dropped: Michigan; Memphis State	Dropped: Oral Roberts; Santa Clara	Dropped: Oklahoma	Dropped: BYU; New Mexico; Penn (7–2)	None	Dropped: Vanderbilt (12–3); Florida State; Louisville	Dropped: New Mexico; Purdue	Dropped: USC	Dropped: San Francisco; Oral Roberts	Dropped: BYU	Dropped: Alabama; Virginia Tech	Dropped: New Mexico (25–5); South Carolina; Purdue	Dropped: Jacksonville; St. John's; Saint Joseph's	

== Coaches Poll ==
	Preseason	Week 1 Dec. 4	Week 2 Dec. 11	Week 3 Dec. 18	Week 4 Dec. 26	Week 5 Jan. 2	Week 6 Jan. 8	Week 7 Jan. 15	Week 8 Jan. 22	Week 9 Jan. 29	Week 10 Feb. 5	Week 11 Feb. 12	Week 12 Feb. 19	Week 13 Feb. 26	Week 14 Mar. 5	Final Mar. 12	
1.	UCLA	UCLA (3–0)	UCLA (3–0)	UCLA (4–0)	UCLA (6–0)	UCLA (8–0)	UCLA (10–0)	UCLA (12–0)	UCLA (14–0)	UCLA (16–0)	UCLA (17–0)	UCLA (18–0)	UCLA (21–0)	UCLA (23–0)	UCLA (25–0)	UCLA (26–0)	1.
2.	Florida State	Florida State (1–0)	Florida State (3–0)	Marquette (4–0)	Marquette (5–0)	Marquette (8–0)	Maryland (9–0)	NC State (12–0)	NC State (12–0)	NC State (14–0)	NC State (16–0)	NC State (19–0)	NC State (21–0)	NC State (23–0)	NC State (25–0)	NC State (27–0)	2.
3.	Maryland	Maryland (2–0)	Marquette (3–0)	Maryland (4–0)	NC State (8–0)	Minnesota (9–0)	Marquette (10–0)	Maryland (10–1)	North Carolina (15–1)	Maryland (14–1)	Long Beach State (17–1)	Long Beach State (19–1)	Long Beach State (20–1)	Minnesota (18–2)	Long Beach State (24–2)	Long Beach State (24–2)	3.
4.	Minnesota	Minnesota (2–0)	Maryland (3–0)	NC State (6–0)	Maryland (5–0)	Maryland (7–0)	NC State (9–0)	North Carolina (13–1)	Maryland (12–1)	Long Beach State (16–1)	Indiana (14–2)	Minnesota (15–2)	Minnesota (16–2)	Marquette (22–2)	Minnesota (20–2)	Marquette (23–3)	4.
5.	Marquette	Marquette (1–0)	Minnesota (3–0)	Minnesota (4–0)	Minnesota (6–0)	NC State (8–0)	Missouri (11–0)	Minnesota (10–1)	Long Beach State (15–1)	Indiana (13–2)	Minnesota (14–2)	Marquette (18–2)	Marquette (20–2)	Long Beach State (22–2)	Marquette (22–3)	Providence (23–2)	5.
6.	Ohio State	Long Beach State (1–0)	NC State (4–0)	Long Beach State (4–0)	Long Beach State (8–0)	Long Beach State (11–0)	North Carolina (12–1)	Long Beach State (13–1)	Indiana (11–2)	Minnesota (12–2)	North Carolina (16–3)	North Carolina (18–4)	North Carolina (20–4)	Providence (21–2)	Providence (22–2)	Indiana (19–5)	6.
7.	Kentucky	NC State (2–0)	Long Beach State (3–0)	Missouri (7–0)	Missouri (8–0)	Missouri (10–0)	Minnesota (9–1)	Marquette (11–1)	Minnesota (11–2)	Alabama (13–1)	Alabama (14–2)	Maryland (16–3)	Kansas State (18–3)	North Carolina (21–5)	North Carolina (22–6)	Southwestern Louisiana (23–3) т	7.
8.	Long Beach State	Southwestern Louisiana (1–0)	Southwestern Louisiana (4–0)	Southwestern Louisiana (6–0)	Penn (5–0)	Southwestern Louisiana (6–0)	Long Beach State (11–1)	Missouri (12–1)	Marquette (12–2)	North Carolina (15–3)	Maryland (14–3)	Houston (17–2)	Providence (18–2)	Kansas State (19–4)	Kansas State (21–4)	Kansas State (22–4) т	8.
9.	Penn	Kentucky (1–0)	North Carolina (4–0)	Florida State (4–1)	Southwestern Louisiana (6–0)	North Carolina (10–1)	Vanderbilt (10–1)	Providence (10–1)	Houston (12–2)	Marquette (14–2)	Missouri (15–2)	Kansas State (16–3)	Maryland (17–4)	Houston (20–3)	Houston (22–3)	Minnesota (20–4)	9.
10.	NC State	Penn (1–0)	Missouri (5–0)	Indiana (5–0)	Vanderbilt (8–0)	New Mexico (9–0)	Providence (7–1)	Kansas State (11–2)	Southwestern Louisiana (12–1)	Missouri (14–2)	Marquette (16–2)	Indiana (14–4)	Houston (18–3)	Memphis State (21–4)	Indiana (18–5)	Maryland (22–6)	10.
11.	Houston	Kansas State (2–0)	Penn (3–0)	Penn (4–0)	Kansas State (7–1)	Vanderbilt (8–1)	San Francisco (10–1)	Indiana (10–2)	Missouri (13–2) т	Houston (13–2)	Houston (15–2)	Providence (16–2)	Memphis State (19–4)	Maryland (19–4)	Memphis State (21–5)	Memphis State (21–5)	11.
12.	North Carolina	North Carolina (2–0)	Indiana (3–0)	Vanderbilt (7–0)	North Carolina (7–1) т	St. John's (8–2)	St. John's (8–2)	Houston (11–2)	Alabama (10–1) т	Providence (12–2)	Kansas State (14–3)	Missouri (16–3)	New Mexico (21–3)	Southwestern Louisiana (22–2)	Southwestern Louisiana (22–3)	North Carolina (22–7)	12.
13.	Southwestern Louisiana	Memphis State (1–0) т	South Carolina (2–1)	Providence (3–1)	Providence (5–1) т	Providence (5–1)	Southwestern Louisiana (7–1)	San Francisco (12–1)	Providence (10–2)	Kansas State (13–3)	St. John's (15–2)	St. John's (17–2)	St. John's (18–3)	Indiana (17–5)	Maryland (20–5)	Arizona State (18–7)	13.
14.	Memphis State	Michigan (1–0) т	Providence (1–0)	North Carolina (6–1)	BYU (6–1) т	San Francisco (8–1)	Kansas State (9–2)	St. John's (9–2)	St. John's (11–2)	St. John's (13–2)	Southwestern Louisiana (16–1)	USC (14–5)	Indiana (15–5)	New Mexico (23–4)	Syracuse (22–4)	Syracuse (22–4)	14.
15.	BYU т	Oral Roberts (0–0) т	Houston (5–1)	Kansas State (6–1)	Indiana (5–1) т	Louisville (8–2)	Houston (10–2)	Southwestern Louisiana (10–1)	Kansas State (11–3)	Southwestern Louisiana (13–1)	Providence (14–2)	Memphis State (17–4)	Southwestern Louisiana (19–2)	Missouri (18–4) т	Missouri (20–4)	Kentucky (19–7)	15.
16.	Kansas State т	USC (1–0) т	Oklahoma (6–0)	New Mexico (6–0)	Washington (8–1) т	Kansas State (9–2)	Indiana (8–2)	Alabama (8–1)	Vanderbilt (12–3)	Memphis State (14–3)	Memphis State (16–3)	BYU (17–4)	Alabama (16–4)	Weber State (19–6) т	Arizona State (15–7)	South Carolina (20–6)	16.
17.	USC	Ohio State (1–1)	Oral Roberts (2–0)	Furman (4–0)	Florida State (5–2) т	South Carolina (7–3)	Alabama (7–1)	Michigan (10–3)	Jacksonville (13–2)	Oregon State (11–5)	San Francisco (16–2)	Southwestern Louisiana (18–2)	San Francisco (19–3) т	San Francisco (20–4) т	St. John's (19–6)	Missouri (21–5)	17.
18.	Providence	Providence (0–0)	San Francisco (4–0)	Houston (7–1)	Michigan (6–1) т	BYU (8–2)	Louisville (10–2)	Florida State (10–3)	New Mexico (15–2)	BYU (14–4)	New Mexico (16–3) т	New Mexico (18–3)	Louisville (18–6) т	Tennessee (14–6) т	New Mexico (25–5)	Houston (22–3)	18.
19.	Oral Roberts	Tennessee (1–0) т	Vanderbilt (5–0)	San Francisco (5–1)	South Carolina (6–2)	Florida State (7–3)	Penn (7–2)	Vanderbilt (10–3) т	San Francisco (12–2) т	San Francisco (14–2) т	Oregon State (12–5) т	Jacksonville (18–3)	Oral Roberts (20–4) т	Jacksonville (20–5) т	Weber State (19–7)	Weber State (20–7)	19.
20.	UTEP	Jacksonville (1–0) т	Iowa (3–0)	Marshall (6–1)	Louisville (6–1)	Penn (5–2)	South Carolina (9–3)	Louisville (11–2) т	Oregon State (10–5) т	South Carolina (12–5) т	BYU (15–4)	Oregon State (14–5)	South Carolina (17–5) т	South Carolina (18–5) т Saint Joseph's (20–5) т	Saint Joseph's (22–5)	Penn (20–5)	20.
	Preseason	Week 1 Dec. 4	Week 2 Dec. 11	Week 3 Dec. 18	Week 4 Dec. 26	Week 5 Jan. 2	Week 6 Jan. 8	Week 7 Jan. 15	Week 8 Jan. 22	Week 9 Jan. 29	Week 10 Feb. 5	Week 11 Feb. 12	Week 12 Feb. 19	Week 13 Feb. 26	Week 14 Mar. 5	Final Mar. 12	
		Dropped: Houston (3–1); BYU; UTEP	Dropped: Kentucky; Kansas State (3–1); Memphis State (7–2); Michigan (3–1); USC; Ohio State; Tennessee; Jacksonville	Dropped: South Carolina; Oklahoma; Oral Roberts; Iowa	Dropped: New Mexico; Furman; Houston; San Francisco; Marshall	Dropped: Indiana; Washington; Michigan	Dropped: New Mexico; BYU; Florida State (8–3)	Dropped: Penn; South Carolina	Dropped: Michigan; Florida State; Louisville	Dropped: Vanderbilt; Jacksonville; New Mexico	Dropped: South Carolina	Dropped: Alabama (14–4); San Francisco	Dropped: Missouri (17–4); USC; BYU; Jacksonville (19–4); Oregon State	Dropped: St. John's; Alabama; Louisville; Oral Roberts	Dropped: San Francisco (21–4); Tennessee; Jacksonville (21–5); South Carolina	Dropped: St. John's; New Mexico; Saint Joseph's	
