= Larry Hollyfield =

American basketball player

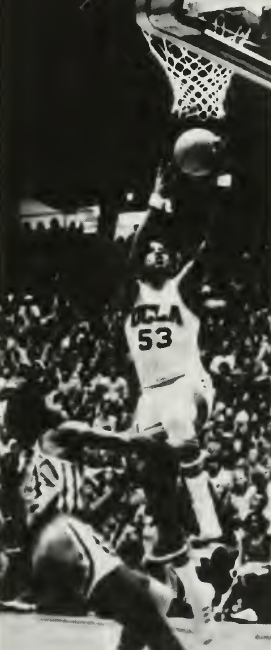
- Hollyfield shooting with UCLA in 1972–73

Personal information
- Born: 1951 or 1952 (age 74–75)
- Listed height: 6 ft 5 in (1.96 m)
- Listed weight: 215 lb (98 kg)

Career information
- High school: Compton (Compton, California)
- College: Compton JC (1969–1970); UCLA (1970–1973)
- NBA draft: 1973: 7th round, 105th overall pick
- Drafted by: Portland Trail Blazers
- Position: Forward / guard
- Number: 53

Career highlights
- 3× NCAA champion (1971–1973)
- Stats at Basketball Reference

Larry Hollyfield (born 1951 or 1952) is a former college basketball player for the UCLA Bruins. He won three consecutive national championships with the Bruins from 1971 to 1973, and helped the school to a record 88-game consecutive win streak.

Hollyfield earned player of year honors playing high school basketball in California before playing one year in junior college, where he earned all-state honors. He transferred to UCLA, where he was a starter in his third and final season. From his junior year in high school through his final season at UCLA, Hollyfield's teams lost just one game while winning championships in each of his six seasons. In 1973 he was drafted by the Portland Trail Blazers of the National Basketball Association (NBA) but never played for them. Instead he went overseas, playing during the 1975–76 season for ADB Koblenz in the German Basketball Bundesliga.

== High school career ==
Hollyfield attended Compton High School, where his teams lost only three times in his career. He won championships in each of his final two years with a combined record of 66–0. In his senior year as a forward, he averaged 18.8 points in 30 games with a field goal percentage of 56 percent, and the Helms Athletic Foundation unanimously named him the 1969 California Interscholastic Federation (CIF) Player of the Year.

== College career ==
Hollyfield played one season at Compton Junior College (later known as El Camino College Compton Center), where he averaged 22 points and was named to the all-state team. The team went undefeated at 33–0, and won the state title.

He then transferred to UCLA for their 1970–71 season, when they won a National Collegiate Athletic Association (NCAA) Division I championship. Although he received minimal playing time during the regular season, he was ineligible for the postseason due to NCAA restrictions on junior college transfers. In his junior year, the 6-foot-5-inch (1.96 m), 215-pound (98 kg) Hollyfield was described by UCLA coach John Wooden as "probably the greatest physical talent on the team". However, the coach also said Hollyfield's mistakes and inconsistent play made him more suited for UCLA's bench where "he gives us a big lift." A natural forward, he moved out of position to guard as a senior, replacing the departed Henry Bibby in the starting lineup. Sports Illustrated wrote, "The feeling was that Hollyfield had to be forced onto the starting five this season or be a detriment to the team." That season ended with a championship over Memphis State in the 1973 NCAA Tournament, extending the school's NCAA record winning steak to 75; the streak ended at 88 after Hollyfield left.

Hollyfield finished his UCLA career with a championship in each of his three seasons. Since his junior year in high school, his teams had a combined record of 184–1 with championships in each of the six seasons.

== Post-college years ==
Hollyfield was selected by the Portland Trail Blazers in the seventh round of the 1973 NBA draft with the 105th overall pick, but he never played professionally. Bibby called Hollyfield "one of best players to go through UCLA and not make pros." According to his former teammate, Hollyfield played behind many great players at UCLA, but "he could have been an All-American on many other teams."

When he was 32, he received a prosthetic left leg after a circulation problem in his left foot required amputation. In 2009, he suffered a stroke which left him partially paralyzed.
