= 1972–73 Providence Friars men's basketball team =

American college basketball season

1972–73 Providence Friars men's basketball
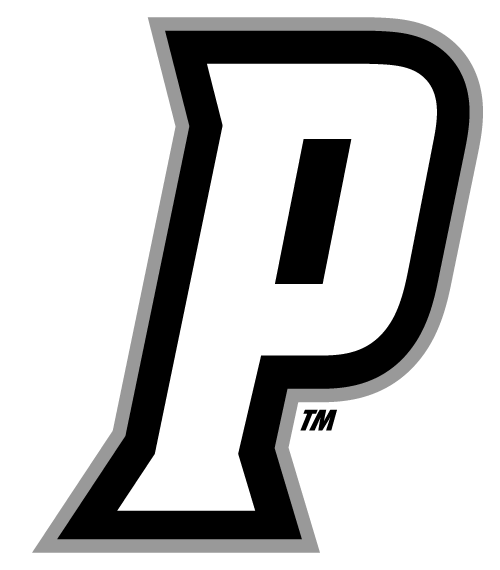

NCAA tournament, Final Four
- Conference: Independent

Ranking
- Coaches: No. 5
- AP: No. 4
- Record: 27–4
- Head coach: Dave Gavitt (4th season)
- Assistant coaches: Jimmy Adams; Nick Macarchuk
- Home arena: Providence Civic Center

1972–73 NCAA University Division men's basketball independents standings
	Conf.				Overall
Team	W		L	PCT	W		L	PCT
No. 4 Providence		–		–	27	–	4	.871
No. 5 Marquette		–		–	27	–	4	.871
No. 13 Houston		–		–	23	–	4	.852
No. 14 Syracuse		–		–	24	–	5	.828
Virginia Tech		–		–	22	–	5	.815
Jacksonville		–		–	21	–	6	.778
Oklahoma City		–		–	21	–	6	.778
Oral Roberts		–		–	21	–	6	.778
South Carolina		–		–	22	–	7	.759
Marshall		–		–	20	–	7	.741
Northeastern		–		–	19	–	7	.731
St. John's		–		–	19	–	7	.731
Centenary		–		–	19	–	8	.704
Florida State		–		–	18	–	8	.692
Northern Illinois		–		–	17	–	8	.680
Duquesne		–		–	16	–	8	.667
Fairfield		–		–	18	–	9	.667
Cincinnati		–		–	17	–	9	.654
Denver		–		–	17	–	9	.654
George Washington		–		–	17	–	9	.654
Penn State		–		–	15	–	8	.652
Detroit		–		–	16	–	9	.640
Hardin–Simmons		–		–	16	–	9	.640
Indiana State		–		–	16	–	10	.615
Manhattan		–		–	16	–	10	.615
Utah State		–		–	16	–	10	.615
Notre Dame		–		–	18	–	12	.600
Air Force		–		–	14	–	10	.583
Creighton		–		–	15	–	11	.577
Hawaii		–		–	15	–	11	.577
Rutgers		–		–	15	–	11	.577
Stetson		–		–	15	–	11	.577
DePaul		–		–	14	–	11	.560
South Alabama		–		–	14	–	11	.560
Trinity (TX)		–		–	14	–	11	.560
Canisius		–		–	13	–	11	.542
Butler		–		–	14	–	12	.538
Charlotte		–		–	14	–	12	.538
Illinois State		–		–	13	–	12	.520
Long Island		–		–	13	–	12	.520
Navy		–		–	13	–	12	.520
Dayton		–		–	13	–	13	.500
Fairleigh Dickinson		–		–	13	–	13	.500
St. Bonaventure		–		–	13	–	13	.500
Portland State		–		–	12	–	12	.500
Georgetown		–		–	12	–	14	.462
Pittsburgh		–		–	12	–	14	.462
Tulane		–		–	12	–	14	.462
Army		–		–	11	–	13	.458
Boston College		–		–	11	–	14	.440
Colgate		–		–	11	–	14	.440
Villanova		–		–	11	–	14	.440
Fordham		–		–	12	–	16	.429
Southern Illinois		–		–	11	–	15	.423
West Virginia		–		–	10	–	15	.400
Cleveland State		–		–	9	–	14	.391
Ball State		–		–	9	–	15	.375
Niagara		–		–	9	–	16	.360
Loyola (IL)		–		–	8	–	15	.348
Holy Cross		–		–	9	–	17	.346
Southern Miss		–		–	8	–	16	.333
St. Francis (NY)		–		–	8	–	16	.333
Portland		–		–	9	–	19	.321
Seton Hall		–		–	8	–	17	.320
Georgia Southern		–		–	8	–	18	.308
Saint Peter's		–		–	8	–	18	.308
Georgia Tech		–		–	7	–	18	.280
Iona		–		–	6	–	16	.273
Samford		–		–	5	–	20	.200
Saint Francis (PA)		–		–	5	–	21	.192
Pan American		–		–	4	–	22	.154
Xavier		–		–	3	–	23	.115
Rankings from AP Poll

The 1972–73 Providence Friars men's basketball team represented Providence College in the 1972–73 NCAA Division I men's basketball season. The Friars, led by fourth-year head coach Dave Gavitt, played their home games at the Providence Civic Center. They finished the season 27–4. They received an at-large bid to the NCAA tournament where they defeated Saint Joseph's in the East Region first round to advance to the East Regional semifinals where they defeated Penn advanced to the East Regional finals where they defeated Maryland to advance to the Final Four for the first time in school history, where they lost to Memphis State in the national semifinals and lost to Indiana in the National Third Place game.

== Roster ==
1972–73 Providence Friars men's basketball team
Players
Coaches

Pos.	#	Name	Height	Weight	Year	Previous school	Hometown
F	23	Allan Baker	6 ft 7 in (2.01 m)	215 lb (98 kg)	Jr	St. Anthony's R.C., Washington, D.C.	Washington, D.C.
C	24	Marvin Barnes	6 ft 9 in (2.06 m)	220 lb (100 kg)	Jr	Central High School (Providence, Rhode Island)	Providence, Rhode Island
G	11	Gary Bello	6 ft 0 in (1.83 m)	165 lb (75 kg)	So	Amity Regional High School	Orange, Connecticut
F	31	Francis Costello	6 ft 8 in (2.03 m)	215 lb (98 kg)	Sr	Catholic Memorial School	Roslindale, Massachusetts
F	22	Charles Crawford	6 ft 6 in (1.98 m)	200 lb (91 kg)	Sr	Hillhouse High School	New Haven, Connecticut
G	15	Ernie DiGregorio	6 ft 0 in (1.83 m)	180 lb (82 kg)	Sr	St. Thomas More School (Connecticut)	North Providence, Rhode Island
F	12	Rich Dunphy	6 ft 4 in (1.93 m)	185 lb (84 kg)	Fr	Holy Cross High School (Queens)	New York City, New York
F	30	Nehru King	6 ft 4 in (1.93 m)	185 lb (84 kg)	Sr	St. Thomas More School (Connecticut)	Jersey City, New Jersey
F	14	Mark McAndrew	6 ft 4 in (1.93 m)	186 lb (84 kg)	Fr	St. Thomas More School (Connecticut)	Westerly, Rhode Island
G	20	Dave Modest	5 ft 11 in (1.8 m)	155 lb (70 kg)	Fr	Linton High School	Schenectady, New York
G	44	Ron Norwood	6 ft 3 in (1.91 m)	180 lb (82 kg)	So	New Hampton School	East Orange, New Jersey
G	25	Kevin Stacom	6 ft 3 in (1.91 m)	185 lb (84 kg)	Jr	Holy Cross High School (Queens)	New York City, New York
G		Thomas Walters	6 ft 0 in (1.83 m)	170 lb (77 kg)	Jr	St. Anthony's R.C., Washington, D.C.	Washington, D.C.

Head coach

- Dave Gavitt

Assistant coach(es)

- Jimmy Adams
- Nick Macarchuk

Legend

- (C) Team captain
- (S) Suspended
- (I) Ineligible
- (W) Walk-on
- Injured
- Current redshirt
