= List of Bradley Braves men's basketball seasons =

This is a list of seasons completed by the Bradley Braves men's college basketball team.

== Seasons ==
Statistics overview
Season	Coach	Overall	Conference	Standing	Postseason
No coach (Independent) (1902–1909)
1902–03	No coach	5–2			
1903–04	No coach	0–4			
1904–05	No coach	5–4			
1905–06	No coach	4–5			
1906–07	No coach	7–6			
1907–08	No coach	9–5			
1908–09	No coach	6–7			
Fred Brown (Independent) (1909–1918)
1909–10	Fred Brown	6–7			
1910–11	Fred Brown	10–3			
1911–12	Fred Brown	11–6			
1912–13	Fred Brown	14–4			
1913–14	Fred Brown	10–10			
1914–15	Fred Brown	13–5			
1915–16	Fred Brown	8–10			
1916–17	Fred Brown	10–6			
1917–18	Fred Brown	6–8			
Fred Brown:		91–65 (.583)	–		
Harold Olsen (Independent) (1918–1919)
1918–19	Harold Olsen	6–9			
Harold Olsen:		6–9 (.400)	–		
Bill Allen (Independent) (1919–1920)
1919–20	Bill Allen	5–10			
Bill Allen:		5–10 (.333)	–		
Alfred J. Robertson (Independent) (1920–1948)
1920–21	Alfred J. Robertson	7–9			
1921–22	Alfred J. Robertson	12–6			
1922–23	Alfred J. Robertson	14–5			
1923–24	Alfred J. Robertson	11–10			
1924–25	Alfred J. Robertson	11–10			
1925–26	Alfred J. Robertson	15–4			
1926–27	Alfred J. Robertson	7–8			
1927–28	Alfred J. Robertson	14–5			
1928–29	Alfred J. Robertson	8–8			
1929–30	Alfred J. Robertson	13–4			
1930–31	Alfred J. Robertson	10–9			
1931–32	Alfred J. Robertson	7–10			
1932–33	Alfred J. Robertson	8–5			
1933–34	Alfred J. Robertson	3–14			
1934–35	Alfred J. Robertson	1–13			
1935–36	Alfred J. Robertson	6–10			
1936–37	Alfred J. Robertson	15–4			
1937–38	Alfred J. Robertson	18–2			NIT Quarterfinal
1938–39	Alfred J. Robertson	19–3			NIT Third Place
1939–40	Alfred J. Robertson	14–6			
1940–41	Alfred J. Robertson	16–6			
1941–42	Alfred J. Robertson	15–5			
1942–43	Alfred J. Robertson	8–11			
1943–44	*** No Basketball	due to World	War II ***		
1944–45	*** No Basketball	due to World	War II ***		
1946–47	Alfred J. Robertson	25–7			NIT Quarterfinal
1947–48	Alfred J. Robertson	28–3			
Alfred J. Robertson:		316–187 (.628)	–		
Forrest "Forddy" Anderson (Missouri Valley Conference) (1948–1951)
1948–49	Forddy Anderson	27–8	6–4	3rd	NIT Fourth Place
1949–50	Forddy Anderson	32–5	11–1	1st	NCAA Runner-up; NIT Runner-up
1950–51	Forddy Anderson	32–6	11–3	T–2nd	National Campus Tournament Runner-up
Forddy Anderson (Independent) (1951–1954)
1951–52	Forddy Anderson	17–12			
1952–53	Forddy Anderson	15–12			
1953–54	Forddy Anderson	19–13			NCAA Runner-up
Forddy Anderson:		142–56 (.717)	25–8		
Bob Vanatta (Independent) (1954–1956)
1954–55	Bob Vanatta	9–20			NCAA Elite Eight
1955–56	Bob Vanatta	13–13	3–9	T–6th	
Bob Vanatta:		22–33 (.400)	3–9		
Chuck Orsborn (Missouri Valley Conference) (1956–1965)
1956–57	Chuck Orsborn	22–7	9–5	2nd	NIT Champion
1957–58	Chuck Orsborn	20–7	12–2	2nd	NIT first round
1958–59	Chuck Orsborn	25–4	12–2	2nd	NIT Runner-up
1959–60	Chuck Orsborn	27–2	12–2	2nd	NIT Champion
1960–61	Chuck Orsborn	21–5	9–3	2nd	
1961–62	Chuck Orsborn	21–7	10–2	T–1st	NIT first round
1962–63	Chuck Orsborn	17–9	6–6	T–3rd	
1963–64	Chuck Orsborn	23–6	7–5	3rd	NIT Champion
1964–65	Chuck Orsborn	18–9	9–5	T–2nd	NIT first round
Chuck Orsborn:		194–56 (.776)	86–32		
Joe Stowell (Missouri Valley Conference) (1965–1978)
1965–66	Joe Stowell	20–6	9–5	T–2nd	
1966–67	Joe Stowell	17–9	6–8	T–4th	
1967–68	Joe Stowell	19–9	12–4	2nd	NIT first round
1968–69	Joe Stowell	14–12	7–9	T–6th	
1969–70	Joe Stowell	14–12	7–9	6th	
1970–71	Joe Stowell	13–12	6–8	6th	
1971–72	Joe Stowell	17–9	8–6	4th	
1972–73	Joe Stowell	12–14	4–10	T–7th	
1973–74	Joe Stowell	20–8	9–3	2nd	NCIT second round
1974–75	Joe Stowell	15–11	7–7	4th	
1975–76	Joe Stowell	13–13	4–8	T–4th	
1976–77	Joe Stowell	9–18	4–8	6th	
1977–78	Joe Stowell	14–14	8–8	T–5th	
Joe Stowell:		197–147 (.573)	91–93		
Dick Versace (Missouri Valley Conference) (1978–1986)
1978–79	Dick Versace	9–17	3–13	T–8th	
1979–80	Dick Versace	23–10	13–3	1st	NCAA Division I first round
1980–81	Dick Versace	18–9	10–6	T–4th	
1981–82	Dick Versace	26–10	13–3	1st	NIT Champion
1982–83	Dick Versace	16–13	10–8	5th	
1983–84	Dick Versace	15–13	7–9	T–5th	
1984–85	Dick Versace	17–13	9–7	T–4th	
1985–86	Dick Versace	32–3	16–0	1st	NCAA Division I second round
Dick Versace:		156–88 (.639)	81–49		
Stan Albeck (Missouri Valley Conference) (1986–1991)
1986–87	Stan Albeck	17–12	10–4	2nd	
1987–88	Stan Albeck	26–5	12–2	1st	NCAA Division I first round
1988–89	Stan Albeck	13–14	7–7	4th	
1989–90	Stan Albeck	11–20	6–8	T–5th	
1990–91	Stan Albeck	8–20	6–10	7th	
Stan Albeck:		75–71 (.514)	41–31		
Jim Molinari (Missouri Valley Conference) (1991–2002)
1991–92	Jim Molinari	7–23	3–15	T–9th	
1992–93	Jim Molinari	11–16	7–11	T–7th	
1993–94	Jim Molinari	23–8	14–4	T–2nd	NIT Quarterfinal
1994–95	Jim Molinari	20–10	12–6	4th	NIT second round
1995–96	Jim Molinari	22–8	15–3	1st	NCAA Division I first round
1996–97	Jim Molinari	17–13	12–6	T–2nd	NIT second round
1997–98	Jim Molinari	15–14	9–9	T–5th	
1998–99	Jim Molinari	17–12	11–7	T–2nd	NIT first round
1999–2000	Jim Molinari	14–16	10–8	5th	
2000–01	Jim Molinari	19–12	12–6	T–2nd	NIT first round
2001–02	Jim Molinari	9–20	5–13	8th	
Jim Molinari:		174–152 (.534)	110–88		
Jim Les (Missouri Valley Conference) (2002–2010)
2002–03	Jim Les	12–18	8–10	T–5th	
2003–04	Jim Les	15–16	7–11	T–6th	
2004–05	Jim Les	13–15	6–12	8th	
2005–06	Jim Les	22–11	11–7	T–5th	NCAA Division I Sweet Sixteen
2006–07	Jim Les	22–13	10–8	4th	NIT second round
2007–08	Jim Les	21–7	9–9	T–5th	CBI Runner-up
2008–09	Jim Les	21–15	10–8	4th	CIT Runner-up
2009–10	Jim Les	16–15	9–9	5th	
2010–11	Jim Les	12–20	4–14	T–9th	
Jim Les:		154–140 (.524)	74–88		
Geno Ford (Missouri Valley Conference) (2011–2015)
2011–12	Geno Ford	7–25	2–16	10th	
2012–13	Geno Ford	18–17	7–11	T–7th	CIT Quarterfinal
2013–14	Geno Ford	12–20	7–11	7th	
2014–15	Geno Ford	9–24	3–15	10th	
Geno Ford:		46–86 (.348)	74–88 (.457)		
Brian Wardle (Missouri Valley Conference) (2015–present)
2015–16	Brian Wardle	5–27	3–15	9th	
2016–17	Brian Wardle	13–20	7–11	T–6th	
2017–18	Brian Wardle	20–13	9–9	5th	
2018–19	Brian Wardle	20–14	9–9	T–5th	NCAA Division I first round
2019–20	Brian Wardle	23–11	11–7	T–3rd	No postseason held
2020–21	Brian Wardle	12–16	6–12	8th	
2021–22	Brian Wardle	17–14	11–7	5th	
2022–23	Brian Wardle	25–10	16–4	1st	NIT first round
2023–24	Brian Wardle	23–12	13–7	3rd	NIT second round
2024–25	Brian Wardle	28–9	15–5	2nd	NIT quarterfinals
2025–26	Brian Wardle	21–13	13–7	2nd	NIT First round
Brian Wardle:		207–159 (.566)	113–93 (.549)		
Total:		1,818–1,287 (.586)			
National champion Postseason invitational champion Conference regular season champion Conference regular season and conference tournament champion Division regular season champion Division regular season and conference tournament champion Conference tournament champion
