= List of Memphis Tigers men's basketball seasons =

This is a list of seasons completed by the Memphis Tigers men's college basketball team.

== Seasons ==
Record table
Season	Coach	Overall	Conference	Standing	Postseason
Frederick Graham (Independent) (1920–1921)
1920–21	Frederick Graham	22–7–1			
W.H. DePriest (Independent) (1921–1922)
1921–22	W.H. DePriest	1–7			
Lester Barnard (Independent) (1922–1924)
1922–23	Lester Barnard	6–4			
1923–24	Lester Barnard	4–9			
Zach Curlin (Independent) (1924–1927)
1924–25	Zach Curlin	3–5			
1925–26	Zach Curlin	4–5			
1926–27	Zach Curlin	5–7			
Zach Curlin (Mississippi Valley Conference) (1927–1934)
1927–28	Zach Curlin	10–11	5–3		
1928–29	Zach Curlin	15–3	8–0		
1929–30	Zach Curlin	16–8	12–2		
1930–31	Zach Curlin	14–2	11–1		
1931–32	Zach Curlin	11–10	9–5		
1932–33	Zach Curlin	7–6	5–3		
1933–34	Zach Curlin	5–14	2–4		
Zach Curlin (Southern Intercollegiate Athletic Association) (1934–1942)
1934–35	Zach Curlin	5–15	3–7		
1935–36	Zach Curlin	7–7	3–7		
1936–37	Zach Curlin	5–7	3–7		
1937–38	Zach Curlin	0–14	0–10		
1938–39	Zach Curlin	2–13	1–9		
1939–40	Zach Curlin	7–9	5–5		
1940–41	Zach Curlin	9–8	4–5		
1941–42	Zach Curlin	7–9	3–7		
Zach Curlin (Independent) (1942–1948)
1942–43	Zach Curlin	7–4			
1943–44	No team (WWII)				
1944–45	Zach Curlin	3–6			
1945–46	Zach Curlin	7–4			
1946–47	Zach Curlin	11–7			
1947–48	Zach Curlin	13–10			
McCoy Tarry (Independent) (1948–1951)
1948–49	McCoy Tarry	11–10			
1949–50	McCoy Tarry	12–9			
1950–51	McCoy Tarry	17–8			NAIA Elite Eight
Eugene Lambert (Independent) (1951–1956)
1951–52	Eugene Lambert	25–10			NAIA 2nd Round
1952–53	Eugene Lambert	10–14			
1953–54	Eugene Lambert	15–9			
1954–55	Eugene Lambert	17–5			NCAA first round
1955–56	Eugene Lambert	20–7			NCAA first round
Bob Vanatta (Independent) (1957–1962)
1956–57	Bob Vanatta	24–6			NIT Runner-up
1957–58	Bob Vanatta	15–7			
1958–59	Bob Vanatta	17–6			
1959–60	Bob Vanatta	18–5			NIT first round
1960–61	Bob Vanatta	20–3			NIT Quarterfinal
1961–62	Bob Vanatta	15–7			NCAA University Division first round
Dean Ehlers (Independent) (1962–1966)
1962–63	Dean Ehlers	19–7			NIT Quarterfinal
1963–64	Dean Ehlers	14–11			
1964–65	Dean Ehlers	10–14			
1965–66	Dean Ehlers	10–15			
Moe Iba (Independent) (1966–1967)
1966–67	Moe Iba	17–9			NIT first round
Moe Iba (Missouri Valley Conference) (1967–1970)
1967–68	Moe Iba	8–17	2–14	9th	
1968–69	Moe Iba	6–19	0–16	9th	
1969–70	Moe Iba	6–20	1–15	9th	
Gene Bartow (Missouri Valley Conference) (1970–1973)
1970–71	Gene Bartow	18–8	8–6	4th	
1971–72	Gene Bartow	21–7	12–2	T–1st	NIT first round
1972–73	Gene Bartow	25–6	12–2	1st	NCAA University Division Runner-up
Gene Bartow (Independent) (1973–1974)
1973–74	Gene Bartow	19–11			NIT Quarterfinal
Wayne Yates (Independent) (1974–1975)
1974–75	Wayne Yates	20–7			NIT first round
Wayne Yates (Metro Conference) (1975–1979)
1975–76	Wayne Yates	21–9	1–1	4th	NCAA Division I first round
1976–77	Wayne Yates	20–9	2–4	T–5th	NIT first round
1977–78	Wayne Yates	19–9	7–5	3rd	
1978–79	Wayne Yates	13–15	5–5	3rd	
Dana Kirk (Metro Conference) (1979–1986)
1979–80	Dana Kirk	13–14	5–7	4th	
1980–81	Dana Kirk	13–14	5–7	5th	
1981–82	Dana Kirk	24–5^{[Note A]}	10–2	1st	NCAA Division I Sweet Sixteen
1982–83	Dana Kirk	23–8^{[Note A]}	6–6	4th	NCAA Division I Sweet Sixteen
1983–84	Dana Kirk	26–7^{[Note A]}	11–3	T–1st	NCAA Division I Sweet Sixteen
1984–85	Dana Kirk	31–4^{[Note A]}	13–1	1st	NCAA Division I Final Four
1985–86	Dana Kirk	28–6^{[Note A]}	9–3	2nd	NCAA Division I second round
Larry Finch (Metro Conference) (1986–1991)
1986–87	Larry Finch	26–8	8–4	2nd	Ineligible
1987–88	Larry Finch	20–12	6–6	T–3rd	NCAA Division I second round
1988–89	Larry Finch	21–11	8–4	T–2nd	NCAA Division I first round
1989–90	Larry Finch	18–12	8–6	4th	NIT first round
1990–91	Larry Finch	17–15	7–7	T–4th	NIT second round
Larry Finch (Great Midwest Conference) (1991–1995)
1991–92	Larry Finch	23–11	5–5	T–3rd	NCAA Division I Elite Eight
1992–93	Larry Finch	20–12	7–3	2nd	NCAA Division I first round
1993–94	Larry Finch	13–16	4–8	T–5th	
1994–95	Larry Finch	24–10	9–3	1st	NCAA Division I Sweet Sixteen
Larry Finch (Conference USA) (1995–1997)
1995–96	Larry Finch	22–8	11–3	1st (White)	NCAA Division I first round
1996–97	Larry Finch	16–15	10–4	T–1st (White)	NIT first round
Tic Price (Conference USA) (1997–1999)
1997–98	Tic Price	17–12	12–4	1st (National)	NIT second round
1998–99	Tic Price	13–15	6–10	T–2nd (National)	
Johnny Jones (Conference USA) (1999–2000)
1999–00	Johnny Jones	15–16	7–9	T–3rd (National)	
John Calipari (Conference USA) (2000–2009)
2000–01	John Calipari	21–15	10–6	T–2nd (National)	NIT Third Place
2001–02	John Calipari	27–9	12–4	1st (National)	NIT Champion
2002–03	John Calipari	23–7	13–3	1st (National)	NCAA Division I first round
2003–04	John Calipari	22–8	12–4	T–1st	NCAA Division I second round
2004–05	John Calipari	22–16	9–7	T–6th	NIT Semifinal
2005–06	John Calipari	33–4	13–1	1st	NCAA Division I Elite Eight
2006–07	John Calipari	33–4	16–0	1st	NCAA Division I Elite Eight
2007–08	John Calipari	38–2^{[Note B]}	16–0^{[Note B]}	1st^{[Note B]}	NCAA Division I Runner-up
2008–09	John Calipari	33–4	16–0	1st	NCAA Division I Sweet Sixteen
Josh Pastner (Conference USA) (2009–2013)
2009–10	Josh Pastner	24–10	13–3	2nd	NIT second round
2010–11	Josh Pastner	25–10	10–6	4th	NCAA Division I second round
2011–12	Josh Pastner	26–9	13–3	1st	NCAA Division I second round
2012–13	Josh Pastner	30–4	16–0	1st	NCAA Division I third round
Josh Pastner (American Athletic Conference) (2013–2016)
2013–14	Josh Pastner	24–10	12–6	T–3rd	NCAA Division I third round
2014–15	Josh Pastner	18–14	10–8	T–5th	
2015–16	Josh Pastner	19–15	8–10	7th	
Tubby Smith (American Athletic Conference) (2016–2018)
2016–17	Tubby Smith	19–13	9–9	T–5th	
2017–18	Tubby Smith	21–13	10–8	5th	
Penny Hardaway (American Athletic / American Conference) (2018–present)
2018–19	Penny Hardaway	22–14	11–7	5th	NIT second round
2019–20	Penny Hardaway	21–10	10–8	T–5th	No postseason held
2020–21	Penny Hardaway	20–8	11–4	3rd	NIT Champion
2021–22	Penny Hardaway	22–11	13–5	3rd	NCAA Division I second round
2022–23	Penny Hardaway	26–9	13–5	2nd	NCAA Division I first round
2023–24	Penny Hardaway	22–10	11–7	T–5th	
2024–25	Penny Hardaway	29–6	16–2	1st	NCAA Division I Round of 64
2025–26	Penny Hardaway	13–19	8–10	T–8th	
Total:		1,419–839–1 (.628)			
National champion Postseason invitational champion Conference regular season champion Conference regular season and conference tournament champion Division regular season champion Division regular season and conference tournament champion Conference tournament champion

^A.The 1982–1986 NCAA tournament records were vacated by the NCAA.
^B.The 2007–08 season was vacated by the NCAA.
