= List of Bradley Braves men's basketball head coaches =

The following is a list of Bradley Braves men's basketball head coaches. The Braves have had 14 coaches in their 119-season history.

Bradley's current head coach is Brian Wardle. He was hired in March 2015 to replace Geno Ford, who was fired after the 2014–15 season.

| No. | Tenure | Coach | Years | Record | Pct. |
|---|---|---|---|---|---|
| – | 1902–1909 | No coach | 7 | 36–33 | .522 |
| 1 | 1909–1918; 1919–1920 (Note: Brown left the team partway through the 1919–20 season; Allen coached the last six games of the season.) | Fred Brown | 10 | 89–64 | .582 |
| 2 | 1918–1919 | Harold Olsen | 1 | 6–9 | .400 |
| 3 | 1920 | Bill Allen | 1 | 2–4 | .333 |
| 4 | 1920–1948 (Note: Bradley did not field basketball teams for the 1943–44 and 1944–45 seasons.) | Alfred J. Robertson | 26 | 316–187 | .628 |
| 5 | 1948–1954 | Forddy Anderson | 6 | 142–56 | .717 |
| 6 | 1954–1956 | Bob Vanatta | 2 | 22–33 | .400 |
| 7 | 1956–1965 | Chuck Orsborn | 9 | 194–56 | .776 |
| 8 | 1965–1978 | Joe Stowell | 13 | 197–147 | .573 |
| 9 | 1978–1986 | Dick Versace | 8 | 156–88 | .639 |
| 10 | 1986–1991 | Stan Albeck | 5 | 75–71 | .514 |
| 11 | 1991–2002 | Jim Molinari | 11 | 174–152 | .534 |
| 12 | 2002–2011 | Jim Les | 9 | 154–140 | .524 |
| 13 | 2011–2015 | Geno Ford | 4 | 46–86 | .348 |
| 14 | 2015–present | Brian Wardle | 8 | 135–126 | .517 |
| Totals | | 14 coaches | 119 seasons | 1,744–1,252 | .582 |
Records updated through end of 2022–23 season Source
