= List of Miami Hurricanes men's basketball seasons =

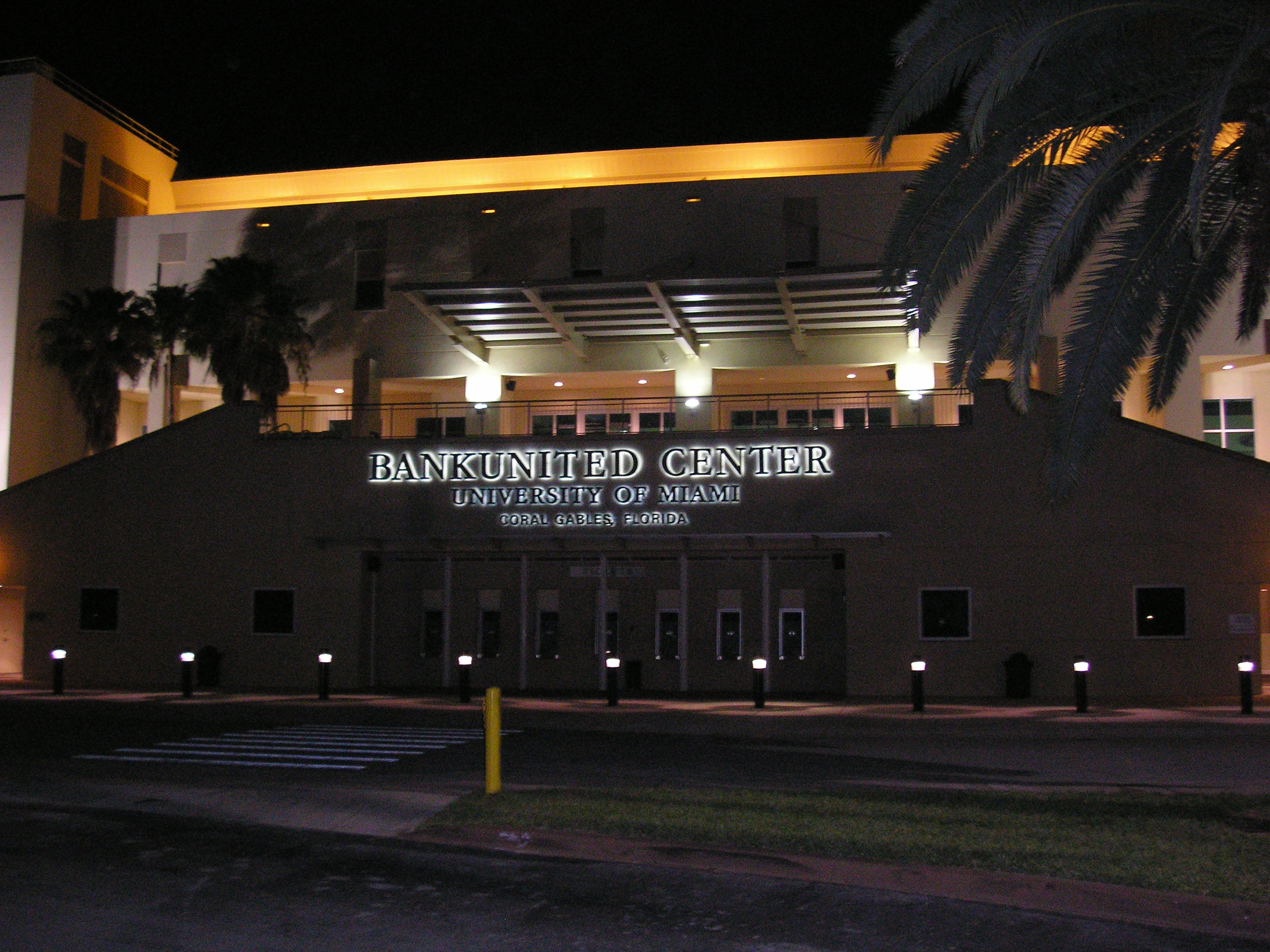
Watsco Center, the home arena of the Miami Hurricanes men's basketball team, on the University of Miami campus, May 2009

This is a list of seasons completed by the Miami Hurricanes men's basketball team of the National Collegiate Athletic Association (NCAA) Division I and the Atlantic Coast Conference (ACC).

== Seasons ==
Statistics overview
Season	Coach	Overall	Conference	Standing	Postseason
Art Webb (Independent) (1926–1928)
1926–27	Art Webb	7–1			
1927–28	Art Webb	8–4			
Tom McCann (Independent) (1928–1929)
1928–29	Tom McCann	13–6			
Art Webb (Independent) (1930–1931)
1930–31	Art Webb	3–7			
Art Webb:		18–12			
Tom McCann (Independent) (1931–1932)
1931–32	Tom McCann	17–1			
Tom McCann:		30–7			
Hart Morris (Independent) (1938–1943)
1938–39	Hart Morris	4–6			
1939–40	Hart Morris	8–12			
1940–41	Hart Morris	10–6			
1941–42	Hart Morris	9–7			
W.H. Steers (Independent) (1945–1946)
1945–46	W.H. Steers	8–5			
W.H. Steers:		8–5			
Hart Morris (Independent) (1946–1952)
1946–47	Hart Morris	20–7			
1947–48	Hart Morris	11–7			
1948–49	Hart Morris	19–8			
1949–50	Hart Morris	14–9			
1950–51	Hart Morris	10–12			
1951–52	Hart Morris	14–8			
Hart Morris:		119–82			
Dave Wike (Independent) (1952–1954)
1952–53	Dave Wike	9–12			
1953–54	Dave Wike	5–10			
Dave Wike:		14–22			
Bruce Hale (Independent) (1954–1967)
1954–55	Bruce Hale	9–11			
1955–56	Bruce Hale	14–12			
1956–57	Bruce Hale	13–13			
1957–58	Bruce Hale	14–8			
1958–59	Bruce Hale	18–7			
1959–60	Bruce Hale	23–4			NCAA University Division first round
1960–61	Bruce Hale	20–7			NIT first round
1961–62	Bruce Hale	14–12			
1962–63	Bruce Hale	23–5			NIT Quarterfinal
1963–64	Bruce Hale	20–7			NIT first round
1964–65	Bruce Hale	22–4			
1965–66	Bruce Hale	15–11			
1966–67	Bruce Hale	15–11			
Bruce Hale:		220–112			
Ron Godfrey (Independent) (1967–1971)
1967–68	Ron Godfrey	17–11			
1968–69	Ron Godfrey	14–10			
1969–70	Ron Godfrey	9–17			
1970–71	Ron Godfrey	7–19			
Ron Godfrey:		47–57			
Bill Foster (Independent) (1985–1990)
1985–86	Bill Foster	14–14			
1986–87	Bill Foster	15–16			
1987–88	Bill Foster	17–14			
1988–89	Bill Foster	19–12			
1989–90	Bill Foster	13–15			
Bill Foster:		78–71			
Leonard Hamilton (Independent) (1990–1991)
1990–91	Leonard Hamilton	9–19			
Leonard Hamilton (Big East Conference) (1991–2000)
1991–92	Leonard Hamilton	8–24	1–17	10th	
1992–93	Leonard Hamilton	10–17	7–11	9th	
1993–94	Leonard Hamilton	7–20	0–18	10th	
1994–95	Leonard Hamilton	15–13	9–9	5th	NIT first round
1995–96	Leonard Hamilton	15–13	8–10	4th (BE7)	
1996–97	Leonard Hamilton	16–13	9–9	T–4th (BE7)	NIT first round
1997–98	Leonard Hamilton	18–10	11–7	2nd (BE7)	NCAA Division I first round
1998–99	Leonard Hamilton	23–7	15–3	2nd	NCAA Division I second round
1999–00	Leonard Hamilton	23–11	13–3	T–1st	NCAA Division I Sweet Sixteen
Leonard Hamilton:		144–147	73–87		
Perry Clark (Big East Conference) (2000–2004)
2000–01	Perry Clark	16–13	8–8	T–3rd (East)	NIT first round
2001–02	Perry Clark	24–8	10–6	2nd (East)	NCAA Division I first round
2002–03	Perry Clark	11–17	4–12	T–6th (East)	
2003–04	Perry Clark	14–16	4–12	T–12th	
Perry Clark:		65–54	26–38		
Frank Haith (Atlantic Coast Conference) (2004–2011)
2004–05	Frank Haith	16–13	7–9	T–6th	NIT first round
2005–06	Frank Haith	18–16	7–9	T–7th	NIT Quarterfinal
2006–07	Frank Haith	12–20	4–12	12th	
2007–08	Frank Haith	23–11	8–8	T–5th	NCAA Division I second round
2008–09	Frank Haith	19–13	7–9	T–7th	NIT second round
2009–10	Frank Haith	20–13	4–12	12th	
2010–11	Frank Haith	21–15	6–10	9th	NIT Quarterfinal
Frank Haith:		129–101	43–69		
Jim Larranaga (Atlantic Coast Conference) (2011–2024)
2011–12	Jim Larranaga	20–13	9–7	6th	NIT second round
2012–13	Jim Larranaga	29–7	15–3	1st	NCAA Division I Sweet Sixteen
2013–14	Jim Larranaga	17–16	7–11	10th	
2014–15	Jim Larranaga	25–13	10–8	6th	NIT Runner-up
2015–16	Jim Larranaga	27–8	13–5	T-2nd	NCAA Division I Sweet Sixteen
2016–17	Jim Larranaga	21–12	10-8	8th	NCAA Division I first round
2017–18	Jim Larranaga	22–10	11-7	3rd	NCAA Division I first round
2018–19	Jim Larranaga	14–18	5–13	T–11th	
2019–20	Jim Larranaga	15–16	7–13	T–10th	No postseason held
2020–21	Jim Larranaga	10–17	4–15	13th	
2021–22	Jim Larranaga	26–11	14–6	4th	NCAA Division I Elite Eight
2022–23	Jim Larranaga	29–8	15–5	T–1st	NCAA Division I Final Four
2023–24	Jim Larranaga	15–17	6–14	14th	
2024–25	Jim Larranaga	4–8	0–1	T-10th	
Jim Larranaga:		274–174	126–116		
Bill Courtney (interim) (Atlantic Coast Conference) (2024–2025)
2024–25	Bill Courtney	3–16	3–16	18th	
Bill Courtney:		3–16	3–16		
Jai Lucas (Atlantic Coast Conference) (2025–present)
2025–26	Jai Lucas	26–9	13–5	3rd	NCAA Division I second round
Total:		1175–869 (.575)			
National champion Postseason invitational champion Conference regular season champion Conference regular season and conference tournament champion Division regular season champion Division regular season and conference tournament champion Conference tournament champion
