= 1979–80 Bradley Braves men's basketball team =

American college basketball season

1979–80 Bradley Braves men's basketball

MVC Regular season and tournament champions

NCAA tournament, First round
- Conference: Missouri Valley Conference
- Record: 23–10 (13–3 MVC)
- Head coach: Dick Versace (2nd season)
- Home arena: Robertson Memorial Field House

1979–80 Missouri Valley Conference men's basketball standings
	Conf.				Overall
Team	W		L	PCT	W		L	PCT
Bradley †	13	–	3	.813	23	–	10	.697
Creighton	9	–	7	.563	16	–	12	.571
West Texas State	9	–	7	.563	19	–	11	.633
Wichita State	9	–	7	.563	17	–	12	.586
Indiana State	8	–	8	.500	16	–	11	.593
New Mexico State	8	–	8	.500	17	–	10	.630
Drake	6	–	10	.375	15	–	12	.556
Tulsa	5	–	11	.313	8	–	19	.296
Southern Illinois	5	–	11	.313	9	–	17	.346
† 1980 MVC tournament winner Rankings from AP Poll

The 1979–80 Bradley Braves men's basketball team represented Bradley University during the 1979–80 NCAA Division I men's basketball season. The Braves were members of the Missouri Valley Conference (MVC) and played their home games at Robertson Memorial Field House in Peoria, Illinois. The team was led by head coach Dick Versace and finished the season at 23–10 (13–3 MVC). After finishing atop the Missouri Valley regular season standings by a 4-game margin, Bradley won the MVC tournament. The Braves earned an automatic bid to the NCAA tournament as No. 11 seed in the Midwest region – the school's first appearance in the NCAA tournament in 25 years. The Braves fell to No. 6 seed Texas A&M, 55–53, in the opening round.

== Roster ==
1979–80 Bradley Braves men's basketball team
Players
Coaches

Pos.	#	Name	Height	Weight	Year	Previous school	Hometown
F		J. J. Anderson	6 ft 8 in (2.03 m)	190 lb (86 kg)	So	Metro	Chicago, IL
F		David Thirdkill	6 ft 7 in (2.01 m)	190 lb (86 kg)	So	College of Southern Idaho	St. Louis, MO

Head coach

- Dick Versace

Assistant coach(es)

Legend

- (C) Team captain
- (S) Suspended
- (I) Ineligible
- (W) Walk-on
- Injured
- Current redshirt

Roster

== Schedule ==
Date time, TV	Rank^{#}	Opponent^{#}	Result	Record	Site (attendance) city, state
Regular season
Nov 30, 1979*		vs. No. 2 Kentucky; Great Alaska Shootout	L 58–79	0–1	Buckner Fieldhouse; Anchorage, Alaska
Dec 1, 1979*		vs. Pacific; Great Alaska Shootout	W 80–68	1–1	Buckner Fieldhouse; Anchorage, Alaska
Dec 2, 1979*		vs. Lamar; Great Alaska Shootout	W 82–75	2–1	Buckner Fieldhouse; Anchorage, Alaska
Dec 5, 1979*		at Loyola (IL)	L 80–83	2–2	Alumni Gym; Chicago, Illinois
Dec 8, 1979*		at Butler	L 63–65	2–3	Hinkle Fieldhouse; Indianapolis, Indiana
Dec 12, 1979*		Portland State	W 90–65	3–3	Robertson Memorial Field House; Peoria, Illinois
Dec 15, 1979*		Rollins	W 78–60	4–3	Robertson Memorial Field House; Peoria, Illinois
Dec 17, 1979*		Quincy	W 77–67	5–3	Robertson Memorial Field House; Peoria, Illinois
Dec 21, 1979*		vs. Loyola (IL)	L 76–84	5–4	Welsh-Ryan Arena; Evanston, Illinois
Dec 22, 1979*		at Northwestern	L 64–67	5–5	Welsh-Ryan Arena; Evanston, Illinois
Dec 29, 1979*		at No. 4 DePaul	L 61–68	5–6	Alumni Hall; Chicago, Illinois
Jan 3, 1980*		Illinois State	W 62–57	6–6	Robertson Memorial Field House; Peoria, Illinois
Jan 5, 1980*		Texas–Arlington	W 79–68	7–6	Robertson Memorial Field House; Peoria, Illinois
Jan 7, 1980		New Mexico State	W 71–60	8–6 (1–0)	Robertson Memorial Field House; Peoria, Illinois
Jan 10, 1980		Wichita State	W 67–66	9–6 (2–0)	Robertson Memorial Field House; Peoria, Illinois
Jan 12, 1980		at Drake	W 75–70	10–6 (3–0)	Veterans Memorial Auditorium; Des Moines, Iowa
Jan 17, 1980		at West Texas A&M	L 78–79	10–7 (3–1)	WT Fieldhouse; Canyon, Texas
Feb 18, 1980		at Creighton	W 76–75	20–8 (13–2)	Omaha Civic Auditorium; Omaha, Nebraska
Feb 23, 1980		at New Mexico State	L 89–90	20–9 (13–3)	Pan American Center; Las Cruces, New Mexico
MVC Tournament
Feb 28, 1980*		Tulsa; Quarterfinals	W 97–76	21–9	Robertson Memorial Field House; Peoria, Illinois
Feb 29, 1980*		Wichita State; Semifinals	W 68–60	22–9	Robertson Memorial Field House; Peoria, Illinois
Mar 1, 1980*		West Texas A&M; Championship game	W 62–59	23–9	Robertson Memorial Field House; Peoria, Illinois
NCAA Tournament
Mar 7, 1980*	(11 MW)	vs. (6 MW) Texas A&M; First round	L 53–55	23–10	UNT Coliseum; Denton, Texas
*Non-conference game. ^{#}Rankings from AP Poll. (#) Tournament seedings in parentheses. MW=Midwest. All times are in Central Time.

== Awards and honors ==
- Dick Versace – MVC Coach of the Year
