= Memphis Tigers men's basketball =

Men's basketball team of the University of Memphis

2026–27 Memphis Tigers men's basketball team
- University: University of Memphis
- First season: 1920
- Head coach: Penny Hardaway (9th season)
- Location: Memphis, Tennessee
- Arena: FedExForum (capacity: 18,119)
- Conference: American
- Nickname: Tigers
- Colors: Blue and gray
- All-time record: 1,406–820–1 (.632)

NCAA Division I tournament runner-up
- 1973, 2008
Other NCAA Division I tournament results
Final Four	1973, 1985, 2008
Elite Eight	1973, 1985, 1992, 2006, 2007, 2008
Sweet Sixteen	1973, 1982, 1983, 1984, 1985, 1992, 1995, 2006, 2007, 2008, 2009
Appearances	1955, 1956, 1962, 1973, 1976, 1982, 1983, 1984, 1985, 1986, 1988, 1989, 1992, 1993, 1995, 1996, 2003, 2004, 2006, 2007, 2008, 2009, 2011, 2012, 2013, 2014, 2022, 2023, 2025

NIT champions
- 2002, 2021

Conference tournament champions
- 1982, 1984, 1985 ,1987, 2006, 2007, 2008, 2009, 2011, 2012, 2013, 2023, 2025

Conference regular-season champions
- 1972, 1973, 1982, 1984, 1985, 1995, 1996, 2004, 2006, 2007, 2008, 2009, 2012, 2013, 2025

Uniforms
Home	Away	Alternate

The Memphis Tigers men's basketball team represents the University of Memphis in NCAA Division I men's college basketball. The Tigers have competed in the American Conference since 2013. As of 2020, the Tigers had the 26th highest winning percentage in NCAA history. While the Tigers have an on-campus arena, Elma Roane Fieldhouse (which is still the primary home for Tigers women's basketball), the team has played home games off campus since the mid-1960s. The Tigers moved to the Mid-South Coliseum at the Memphis Fairgrounds in 1966, and then to downtown Memphis at The Pyramid, initially built for the team in 1991 and later home to the NBA's Memphis Grizzlies. In 2004, both teams moved to a new downtown venue, FedExForum. ESPN Stats and Information Department ranked Memphis as the 19th most successful basketball program from 1962 to 2012 in their annual 50 in 50 list.

== History ==
=== Early years ===
The predecessor of the University of Memphis, West Tennessee State Normal School, first put a basketball team on the court in 1920. Zach Curlin began coaching the team in 1924. The Tigers joined the Mississippi Valley Conference in 1928. The team played its early home games at a local high school gym, a local YMCA, and in a room on campus called the "Normal Cage" which allowed only six inches from the court lines to the walls. In 1929, a $100,000 facility on campus named Memorial Gym became the Tigers' home.

Curlin's last season coaching the Tigers was in 1948, by which time the school had been renamed Memphis State College; it would become Memphis State University in 1957. His successor was McCoy Tarry. In 1951, the new $700,000 Fieldhouse gym was opened for Tiger home games. In 1952, John Wallesea became the first Memphis State player to be drafted by the NBA. Forest Arnold became the school's first All-American in 1954. The Tigers made the NCAA tournament for the first time, in 1955, under coach Eugene Lambert. Bob Vanatta became the team's coach in 1956 and took the Tigers to the NIT final. Win Wilfong became the team's second All-American in 1957.

In 1962, Dean Ehlers took over coaching duties. The Tigers began playing its home games at the Mid-South Coliseum in 1964. Moe Iba became the team's coach in 1966, the same year the team joined the Missouri Valley Conference. Iba's four years running the program are considered the low point in the history of Memphis basketball, with the team suffering 19 and 20 loss seasons before Iba's dismissal. However, the Tigers did not remain down for long.

=== 1970s ===
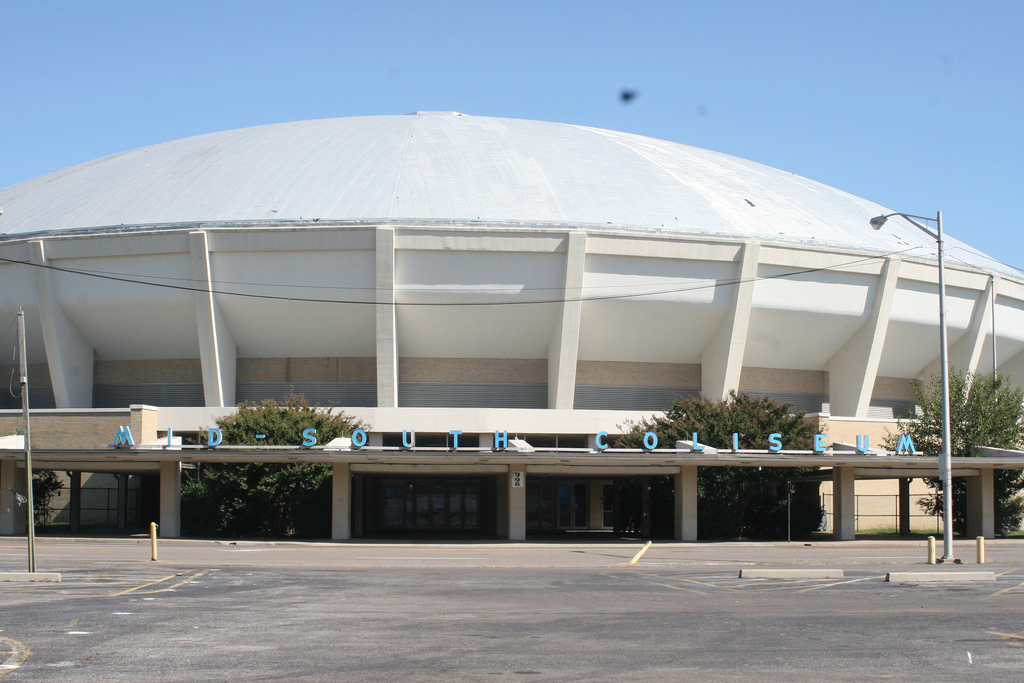
The Mid-South Coliseum, home of the Tigers from 1966 to 1991.

In 1970, Gene Bartow was named head coach. The 1970 season also saw the first games of Larry Finch and Ronnie Robinson, two all-time greats. Larry Finch scored 24 points in his first appearance as a freshman. In 1971, the Tigers led by Finch and Robinson upset conference rival Louisville. At 11–2, they were ranked #19 after not reaching the Top 20 in a decade. Early in the 1971–1972 season, Memphis State fell in a heart breaker to No. 2 Marquette after leading by five points with five minutes to go. After defeating Louisville in Freedom Hall, the Tigers shared the Missouri Valley Conference title in 1972 with Louisville. Louisville won a playoff to represent the MVC in the NCAA Tournament while the Tigers went to the NIT for their fifth time.

During the 1972–73 season, seniors Finch and Robinson led the Tigers to one of their most successful seasons. Memphis State won the MVC outright in 1972 after winning 14 straight games. They went to the NCAA tournament where they handily beat South Carolina and Kansas State after a first round bye to reach the Final Four. After beating Providence, the Tigers went to play for the national championship against the UCLA Bruins led by legendary coach John Wooden and led by star Bill Walton. Keeping it close in the first half, the Tigers were overwhelmed in the second half eventually losing by 21, 87–66. Bartow won the NABC National Coach of the Year award that season and Larry Finch was named a consensus All-American. Also on the Finals team was Larry Kenon who went on to be a 2-time All-Star in the NBA. He remains one of the most successful NBA players in Memphis history. Wayne Yates took over for Bartow in 1974 when Bartow left for Illinois. Yates led Memphis State to three straight 20-win seasons, including an NCAA Tournament berth in 1976. The Tigers left the Missouri Valley Conference to become one of the inaugural members of the Metro Conference in 1976. Dana Kirk became head coach in 1979.

=== 1980s ===
In the 1980s, the Tigers made seven NCAA tournaments and won three Metro Conference titles, amassing a record of 230–87 (.726). Keith Lee began playing for the Tigers in 1982, and Memphis was ranked number one in both major national polls for the first time the same year. However, that same night they were knocked off by Virginia Tech 69–56 in Blacksburg. In the 1983 NCAA tournament, the Tigers beat Georgetown led by Patrick Ewing, whom Lee dominated in the paint. They lost their next game to top-seed Houston led by Hakeem Olajuwon.

After finishing 24–3 in the regular season, the 1984–1985 season proved to be another memorable one in Tiger history. Lee eventually led the team to another NCAA tournament in 1985. Memphis State beat Penn, UAB, Boston College and Oklahoma to reach the school's second Final Four. They were defeated by eventual champion Villanova and finished the season 31–4. All but one of the 12 players on this team were from the Memphis metro area. Lee was named a consensus All-American for the third time in his four-year career. In 1986, Kirk was forced out after becoming the subject of a criminal investigation. He was also found to have committed many NCAA violations as well. The Tigers were forced to sit out the 1987 NCAA tournament and were stripped of all of their NCAA tournament appearances from 1982 to 1986, including the 1985 Final Four run. Kirk's top assistant, Larry Finch, one of the leaders of the fabled 1972–73 team, took over head coaching duties in 1986. One of Finch's first recruits, Elliot Perry, began playing for the team in 1987. Perry led Memphis State to the 1988 and 1989 NCAA Tournaments and was drafted to the NBA where he became a successful player. In the 1988–89 season, the Tigers set a school record by starting the game against arch-rival Louisville with a 24–0 run.

=== 1990s ===
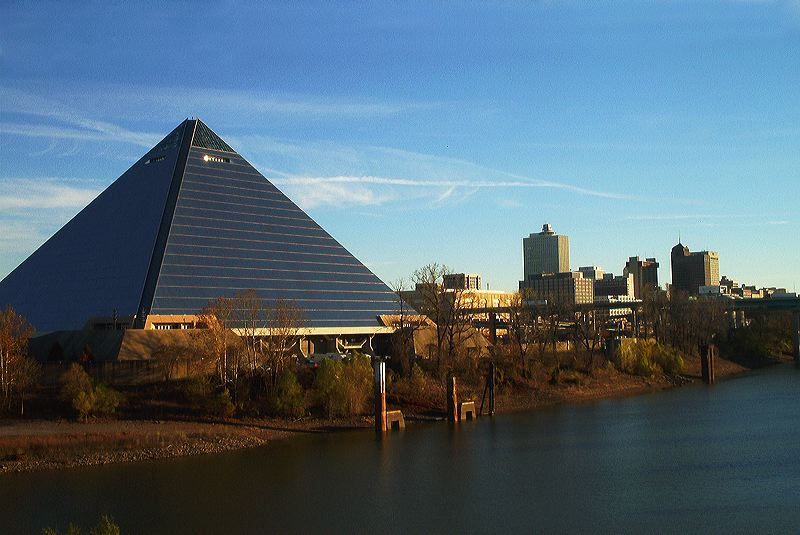
The Pyramid Arena, the Tigers' home from 1991 to 2004.

In 1990, Finch landed the country's highest rated high school recruit, Anfernee "Penny" Hardaway. The Tigers also moved to the Great Midwest Conference and began playing their home games at the new Pyramid Arena (affectionately known as the "Tomb of Doom") in 1991. Stand-out Hardaway led Memphis State to the 1992 NCAA tournament, where the Tigers were defeated in the Elite Eight by rival Cincinnati. The following summer, Hardaway was named All-American and earned a chance to train with the Dream Team before the Barcelona Olympics. During the 1992–93 season, Hardaway earned Memphis State's first triple-double and then the first back-to-back triple-doubles in wins over Georgia State and Vanderbilt. On February 6, 1993, the school achieved its 1,000th all-time basketball victory in an upset over No. 4 Cincinnati. After the season, Penny Hardaway left for the NBA draft where he was selected third overall by the Golden State Warriors. He became the most successful NBA player in history to matriculate from the Memphis basketball program. In 1994, Memphis State changed its name to the University of Memphis.

In 1995, the Memphis team included future NBA players David Vaughn, Cedric Henderson, and Lorenzen Wright, and they made it to the 1995 NCAA tournament where they lost in the Sweet Sixteen. Memphis joined Conference USA in 1995 as a founding member with long-time rivals Louisville and Cincinnati. Finch stepped down as head coach in 1997 and Tic Price took over thereafter. Price's three years were one of the Tigers' least successful since the 1960s. He was forced to resign just days before the start of the 1999–2000 season after school officials discovered he was involved in an inappropriate relationship with a student at the university. Johnny Jones spent one year as interim head coach while the school looked for a replacement.

=== 2000s ===
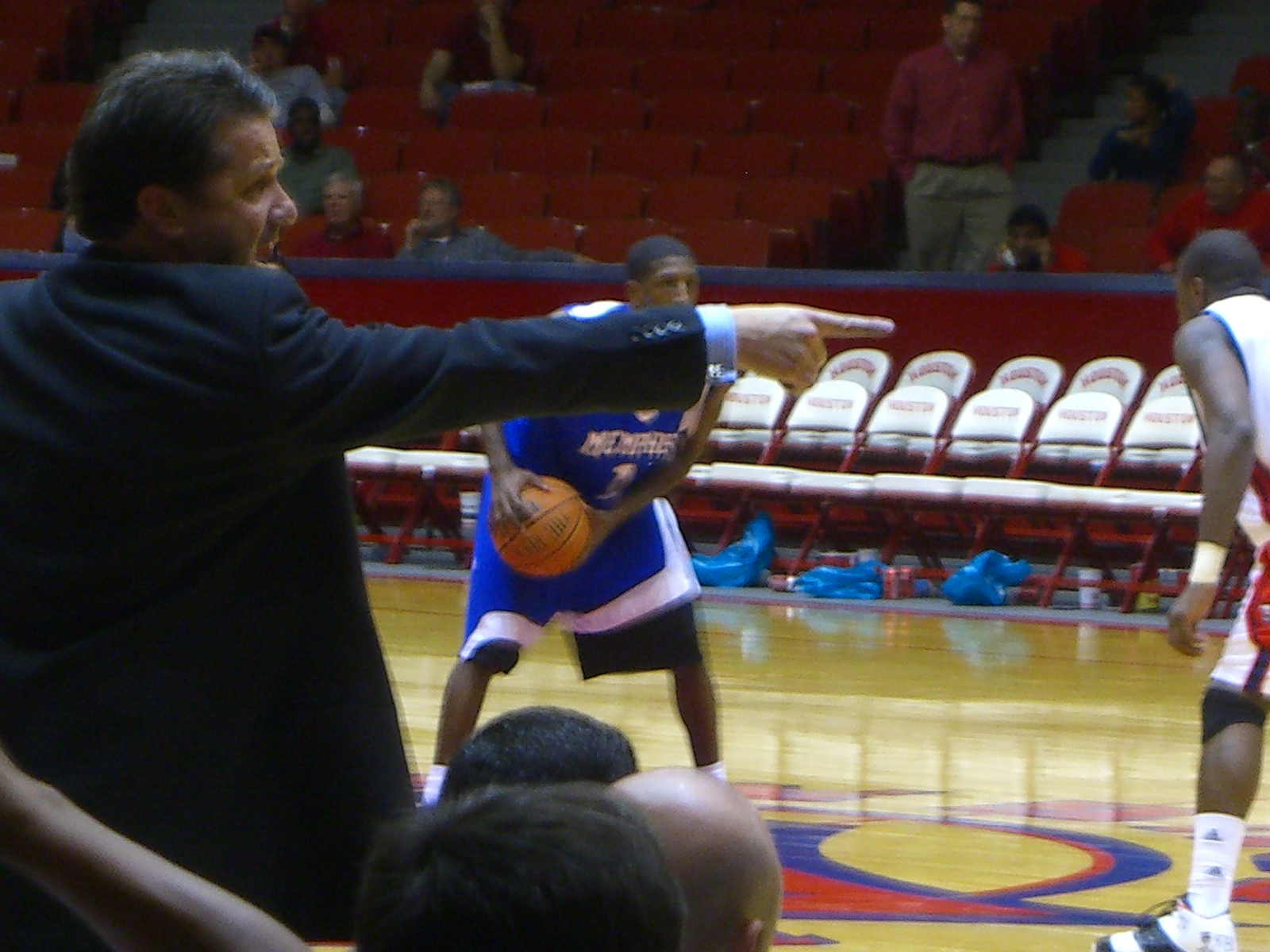
Calipari directing his players during an away game against Conference USA rival Houston in January 2007.

John Calipari was named Memphis' head coach in 2000. Under his leadership, the Tigers won the 2002 NIT championship, then made the NCAA tournament in 2003 and 2004. The Tigers left The Pyramid to play home games in the FedExForum in 2004. The 2005–06 Tigers were led by Darius Washington, Shawne Williams and Rodney Carney and set a school record by going 30–3 and reaching a No. 3 ranking during a regular season that was capped by a Conference USA championship. In the 2006 NCAA tournament, the Tigers received a number one seed, and they advanced to the Elite Eight before falling to eventual tournament runner-up UCLA.

Despite losing their top three scorers from the prior season to the NBA and graduation, the 2006–07 Tigers duplicated the previous year's regular season record of 30–3, were ranked as high as No. 5, and again won the Conference USA championship, going undefeated in conference play. The Tigers earned a number two seed in the 2007 NCAA tournament. The Tigers defeated 15 seed North Texas in the first round, 7 seed Nevada in the second round, and 3 seed Texas A&M in the Sweet Sixteen, and lost to 1 seed and eventual tournament runner-up Ohio State in the Elite Eight.

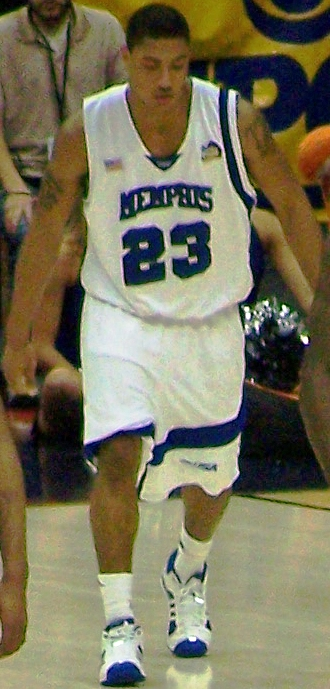
Derrick Rose during the 2008 NCAA tournament

The 2007–08 Memphis Tigers men's basketball team achieved a No. 1 ranking in the Associated Press basketball poll in January 2008, the school's first No. 1 ranking in the poll since 1982, and went on to win their third straight Conference USA title on March 15, 2008. After a month, they lost this ranking when they were defeated by in-state rival and No. 2-ranked Tennessee at home. Led by First-Team All-American Chris Douglas-Roberts and future No. 1 overall pick Derrick Rose, the team received a No. 1 seed in the 2008 NCAA tournament and defeated No. 16 seed Texas-Arlington in round one, No. 8 seed Mississippi State in round two, and No. 5 seed Michigan State in the Sweet Sixteen. Memphis convincingly defeated No. 2 seed Texas in the Elite Eight round to advance to the school's first Final Four since 1985. Following this win, Memphis went on to beat No. 1 seed UCLA on April 5, 2008, advancing to the National Championship game on April 7, 2008. With this win, Memphis became the first team in NCAA history to achieve 38 wins in a single season. After holding a nine-point lead with two minutes and 12 seconds left in regulation, the Tigers lost to Kansas in the National Championship in overtime by the final score of 75–68, becoming the second NCAA runner-up team in Memphis history.

The 2008–09 Tigers, led by another freshman guard, Tyreke Evans, again went undefeated in Conference USA and earned a two seed in the 2009 NCAA tournament. The Tigers were defeated by the No. 3-seed Missouri Tigers in the Sweet Sixteen. Evans left after one year and was named NBA Rookie of the Year in 2010, the second straight Tiger to do so after Rose. On March 31, 2009, Calipari resigned to become the head coach at the University of Kentucky. In the months following Calipari's departure, nearly all of the incoming recruits who had committed to play basketball for the University of Memphis decommitted from Memphis and committed to Kentucky or other schools. The recruits included Xavier Henry, DeMarcus Cousins, Nolan Dennis, and Darnell Dodson.

On May 28, 2009, the NCAA formally accused the Tigers of allowing an ineligible player to participate in their games during the 2007–08 season. On August 20, 2009, the NCAA Committee on Infractions announced that Memphis must vacate all 38 wins for that season as well as their appearance in the NCAA tournament and spend three years on probation. The NCAA alleged that Derrick Rose, a Chicago native, had obtained a fraudulent SAT score when another person took the test for him in Detroit, Michigan and his brother Reggie Rose was provided nearly $1,700 in free travel and lodging with the Memphis team. The University of Memphis was not charged with knowingly fielding an ineligible player given that Rose had originally been cleared by the testing company and the NCAA. Rather, the NCAA imposed the penalty on a "strict liability" standard which held that Memphis must vacate their wins regardless of whether the school had any knowledge of wrongdoing by Rose and regardless of the NCAA's original clearance of Rose.

=== 2010s – present ===
On April 7, 2009, Josh Pastner was named the team's head coach. Pastner was hired as an assistant at Memphis in 2008 after serving as an assistant coach under Lute Olson at Arizona for six years. Pastner gained a reputation as a strong recruiter during his tenure at Arizona. In his first year as coach at Memphis, Pastner brought in Elliot Williams, a transfer from Duke, who led the team in scoring and was drafted to the NBA. Williams was permitted to play his first season after departing Calipari took with him Memphis' top-ranked recruiting class. In 2011 Pastner led the Tigers back to the NCAA tournament for the first time in his coaching career, though they lost in the first round to his former team, Arizona.

During the 2011–12 season, the Tigers announced they were leaving Conference USA to join the Big East Conference starting in 2013 (later renamed the American Athletic Conference, and now known as the American Conference). They began the season strong, moving as high to No. 13 in the country before falling out of the rankings (a phenomenon which would become a recurrent theme of the Pastner era). In the last game of the season, Josh Pastner's victory over Tulsa gave him 72 career victories, the most by a Memphis head coach over his first three seasons. Memphis made its second straight NCAA Tournament after winning the Conference USA tournament. An 8-seed, the Tigers lost in the first round to 9-seeded Saint Louis. After the season, sophomore star Will Barton left for the NBA.

In 2012–13, the Tigers, led by CUSA player of the year Joe Jackson, won the Conference USA regular season and tournament titles in their last season in CUSA. The Tigers began competition in the then newly formed American Athletic Conference in 2013. AAC competition was not as kind to the Pastner-led Tigers, as they earned an NCAA tournament berth in only 1 of the team's first 3 seasons in the AAC.

On April 8, 2016, facing mounting criticism in Memphis, Pastner took the job of head men's basketball coach at Georgia Tech. A few days later, the Tigers hired Tubby Smith to take over the head coaching job. Smith had just won the Big 12 coach of the year award as well as some national coaching awards for his season at Texas Tech.

Smith was fired on March 14, 2018 after failing to reach the NCAA Tournament in both of his two years as head coach. Penny Hardaway was later confirmed as Smith's replacement.

On March 28, 2021, the Tigers won their second NIT tournament with a 77–65 win over the #4 seed Mississippi State Bulldogs, finishing their season at 20–8.

On June 11, 2021 speculation began to circulate that Penny Hardaway was a candidate for multiple head coaching jobs in the NBA, including his former team the Orlando Magic. On June 28, reports emerged that Hardaway had in fact interviewed and emerged as a top candidate for the Magic's vacant head coaching job. Two days later, via Instagram, Hardaway confirmed he was not leaving the University of Memphis, and reports emerged the same day that Hall of Fame coach Larry Brown had accepted an offer to be his assistant. Brown was an assistant coach for the 2021-22 season, but changed his role to advisor for the 2022-23 season, and left the program for health reasons in December 2022.

== Postseason ==
=== NCAA tournament results ===
The Tigers have appeared in the NCAA Tournament 29 times. Their overall record is 35–29. However, wins in 1982–1986 and 2008 have been vacated.

Year	Seed	Round	Opponent	Result
1955	–	First Round	Penn State	L 55–59
1956	–	First Round	Oklahoma City	L 81–97
1962	–	First Round	Creighton	L 83–87
1973	–	Sweet Sixteen; Elite Eight; Final Four; National Championship Game	South Carolina; Kansas State; Providence; UCLA	W 90–76; W 92–72; W 98–85; L 66–87
1976	–	First Round	Pepperdine	L 77–87
1982*	#2	Second Round; Sweet Sixteen	#7 Wake Forest #3 Villanova	W 56–55; L 66–70
1983*	#4	Second Round; Sweet Sixteen	#5 Georgetown #1 Houston	W 66–57; L 63–70
1984*	#6	First Round; Second Round; Sweet Sixteen	#11 Oral Roberts #3 Purdue #2 Houston	W 92–83; W 66–48; L 71–78
1985*	#2	First Round; Second Round; Sweet Sixteen; Elite Eight; Final Four	#15 Penn #7 UAB #11 Boston College #1 Oklahoma #8 (S) Villanova	W 67–55; W 67–66 ^{OT} W 59–57; W 63–61; L 45–52
1986*	#3	First Round; Second Round	#14 Ball State #11 LSU	W 95–63; L 81–83
1988	#9	First Round; Second Round	#8 Baylor #1 Purdue	W 75–60; L 73–100
1989	#5	First Round	#12 DePaul	L 63–66
1992	#6	First Round; Second Round; Sweet Sixteen; Elite Eight	#11 Pepperdine #3 Arkansas #7 Georgia Tech #4 Cincinnati	W 80–70; W 82–80; W 83–79; L 57–88
1993	#10	First Round	#7 Western Kentucky	L 52–55
1995	#6	First Round; Second Round; Sweet Sixteen	#11 Louisville #3 Purdue #2 Arkansas	W 77–56; W 75–73; L 91–96 ^{OT}
1996	#5	First Round	#12 Drexel	L 63–75
2003	#7	First Round	#10 Arizona State	L 71–84
2004	#7	First Round; Second Round	#10 South Carolina #2 Oklahoma State	W 59–43; L 53–70
2006	#1	First Round; Second Round; Sweet Sixteen; Elite Eight	#16 Oral Roberts #9 Bucknell #13 Bradley #2 UCLA	W 94–78; W 72–56; W 80–64; L 45–50
2007	#2	First Round; Second Round; Sweet Sixteen; Elite Eight	#15 North Texas #7 Nevada #3 Texas A&M #1 Ohio State	W 73–58; W 78–62; W 65–64; L 76–92
2008*	#1	First Round; Second Round; Sweet Sixteen; Elite Eight; Final Four; National Championship Game	#16 Texas–Arlington #8 Mississippi State #5 Michigan State #2 Texas #1 (W) UCLA #1 (M) Kansas	W 87–63; W 77–74; W 92–74; W 85–66; W 78–63; L 68–75 ^{OT}
2009	#2	First Round; Second Round; Sweet Sixteen	#15 Cal State Northridge #10 Maryland #3 Missouri	W 81–70; W 89–70; L 91–102
2011	#12	First Round	#5 Arizona	L 75–77
2012	#8	First Round	#9 Saint Louis	L 54–61
2013	#6	First Round; Second Round	#11 Saint Mary's #3 Michigan State	W 54–52; L 48–70
2014	#8	First Round; Second Round	#9 George Washington #1 Virginia	W 71–66; L 60–78
2022	#9	First Round; Second Round	#8 Boise State #1 Gonzaga	W 64–53; L 78–82
2023	#8	First Round	#9 Florida Atlantic	L 65–66
2025	#5	First Round	#12 Colorado State	L 70–78

* = vacated by NCAA

=== NIT results ===
The Tigers have appeared in the National Invitation Tournament (NIT) 19 times. Their combined record is 24–17 and they were NIT champions in 2002 and 2021.

Year	Round	Opponent	Result
1957	First Round; Quarterfinals; Semifinals; Final	Utah; Manhattan; St. Bonaventure; Bradley	W 77–75; W 85–73; W 80–78; L 83–84
1960	First Round	Providence	L 70–71
1961	Quarterfinals	Holy Cross	L 69–81
1963	First Round; Quarterfinals	Fordham; Canisius	W 70–49; L 67–76
1967	First Round	Providence	L 68–77
1972	First Round	Oral Roberts	L 74–94
1974	First Round; Quarterfinals	Seton Hall; Utah	W 73–72; L 78–92
1975	First Round	Oral Roberts	L 95–97
1977	First Round	Alabama	L 63–86
1990	First Round	Tennessee	L 71–73
1991	First Round; Second Round	UAB; Arkansas State	W 82–76; L 57–58
1997	First Round	UNLV	L 62–66
1998	First Round; Second Round	Ball State; Fresno State	W 90–67; L 80–83
2001	First Round; Second Round; Quarterfinals; Semifinals; 3rd Place Game	Utah; UTEP; New Mexico; Tulsa; Detroit	W 71–62; W 90–65; W 81–63; L 64–72; W 86–71
2002	First Round; Second Round; Quarterfinals; Semifinals; Final	UNC Greensboro; BYU; Tennessee Tech; Temple; South Carolina	W 82–62; W 80–69; W 79–72; W 79–77; W 72–62
2005	First Round; Second Round; Quarterfinals; Semifinals	Northeastern; Virginia Tech; Vanderbilt; Saint Joseph's	W 90–65; W 83–62; W 81–68; L 58–70
2010	First Round; Second Round	St. John's; Ole Miss	W 73–71; L 81–90
2019	First Round; Second Round	San Diego; Creighton	W 74–60; L 67–79
2021	First Round; Quarterfinals; Semifinals; Final	Dayton; Boise State; Colorado State; Mississippi State	W 71–60; W 59–56; W 90–67; W 77–64

== Awards ==
=== Basketball Hall of Fame ===
The Memphis program has had three coaches inducted into the National College Basketball Hall of Fame (Gene Bartow, Tubby Smith) and Naismith Memorial Basketball Hall of Fame (John Calipari). The school has yet to produce any players that have been inducted. Larry Brown was hired as an assistant in 2021 and was already a member of both the College and Naismith halls of fame.

==== Naismith Basketball Hall of Fame ====
- 2015 — John Calipari, Coach, 2000–2009

==== College Basketball Hall of Fame ====
- 2010 — Gene Bartow, Coach, 1970–1974
- 2026 — Tubby Smith, Coach, 2016–2018

=== Major Individual Awards ===
- 1973 — Gene Bartow, NABC Coach of the Year
- 2008 — John Calipari, Naismith College Coach of the Year
- 2009 — John Calipari, NABC Coach of the Year
- 2009 — John Calipari, Sports Illustrated National Coach of the Year
- 2009 — John Calipari, Jim Phelan National Coach of the Year Award
- 2009 — Tyreke Evans, USBWA National Freshman of the Year

=== All-Americans ===
Memphis has had 10 players chosen as All-Americans by the four sources used by the NCAA to determine consensus teams, the Associated Press, the United States Basketball Writers Association, the National Association of Basketball Coaches and The Sporting News (which replaced the United Press International in 1998). Three players have been unanimous first team selections (Keith Lee, Anfernee Hardaway, and Chris Douglas-Roberts). Keith Lee was the only Tiger to be selected more than once, eventually being selected three of his four years at Memphis.

NCAA Recognized All-Americans
Year	Player	Consensus	Points ^{[a]}	AP	USBWA	NABC	UPI/TSN
1973	Larry Finch	2nd	3^{[b]}	HM	1st	-	-
1982	Keith Lee	-	2^{[b]}	2nd	-	-	-
1983	Keith Lee	1st	10^{[b]}	2nd	1st	2nd	1st
1984	Keith Lee	2nd	7	3rd	2nd	2nd	2nd
1985	Keith Lee	1st	12	1st	1st	1st	1st
1986	William Bedford	-	1	3rd	-	4th	-
1993	Anfernee Hardaway	1st	12	1st	1st	1st	1st
1996	Lorenzen Wright	2nd	5	2nd	-	3rd	2nd
2006	Rodney Carney	2nd	6	2nd	2nd	2nd	-
2008	Chris Douglas-Roberts	1st	12	1st	1st	1st	1st
2008	Derrick Rose	-	2	3rd	-	3rd	-
2023	Kendric Davis	-	1	HM	-	-	3rd
2025	P.J. Haggerty	2nd	7	2nd	2nd	3rd	2nd

- ^{a} The NCAA uses points to determine consensus teams, awarding 3 points for a 1st team selection, 2 points for 2nd team, and 1 point for 3rd team.
- ^{b} The NCAA began calculating points to determine consensus in 1984. Point totals are shown before 1984 for comparative purposes.

==== School recognized ====
According to the program's records, the school recognizes the following bodies for their selection of All-America teams: UPI, Converse, ESPN, Associated Press, Basketball Times, Basketball Weekly, USBWA, The Sporting News, Scripps-Howard, Wooden Award, CBSSports.com, FOXSports.com, Collegehoops.net, Rivals.com, NBC, NABC, College Sports, Collegeinsider.com, Sports Illustrated, NaismithLives.com and Rupp Trophy. They recognize all levels including honorable mentions and freshman teams.

The University of Memphis currently recognizes 38 players as All-Americans:

- Forest Arnold (1954, 1955, 1956)
- Orby Arnold (1958)
- Sean Banks (2004)
- Will Barton (2012)
- Hunter Beckman (1962)
- William Bedford (1986)
- James Bradley (1977, 1978, 1979)
- Antonio Burks (2004)
- Mike Butler (1968)
- Rodney Carney (2006)
- Bill Cook (1974, 1975, 1976)
- Kendric Davis (2023)
- James Douglas (1971)
- Chris Douglas-Roberts (2007, 2008)
- Tyreke Evans (2009)
- Larry Finch (1972, 1973)
- Sylvester Gray (1987)
- Anfernee "Penny" Hardaway (1992, 1993)
- Cedric Henderson (1994)
- Marion Hillard (1975, 1976)
- Otis Jackson (1982)
- David Jones (2024)
- Rich Jones (1969)
- Larry Kenon (1973)
- George Kirk (1963, 1964)
- Keith Lee (1982, 1983, 1984, 1985)
- Todd Mundt (1990)
- Bobby Parks (1983)
- Elliot Perry (1988, 1989, 1990)
- Dexter Reed (1977)
- Ronnie Robinson (1972, 1973)
- Derrick Rose (2008)
- Andre Turner (1983, 1986)
- David Vaughn III (1992)
- Dajuan Wagner (2002)
- Darius Washington Jr. (2005, 2006)
- Win Wilfong (1956, 1957)
- Shawne Williams (2006)
- Lorenzen Wright (1995, 1996)
- Wayne Yates (1961)

=== Conference Awards ===
==== Conference Player of the Year ====
Year	Player	Conference
1971–72	Larry Finch	Missouri Valley
1972–73	Larry Kenon	Missouri Valley
1981–82	Keith Lee	Metro
1982–83	Keith Lee	Metro
1991–92	Penny Hardaway	Great Midwest
1992–93	Penny Hardaway	Great Midwest
2003–04	Antonio Burks	Conference USA
2005–06	Rodney Carney	Conference USA
2007–08	Chris Douglas-Roberts	Conference USA
2011–12	Will Barton	Conference USA
2012–13	Joe Jackson	Conference USA
2019–20	Precious Achiuwa	American
2024–25	P.J. Haggerty	American

==== Conference Coach of the Year ====
Year	Player	Conference
1986–87	Larry Finch	Metro
1988–89	Larry Finch	Metro
2005–06	John Calipari	Conference USA
2007–08	John Calipari	Conference USA
2008–09	John Calipari	Conference USA
2012–13	Josh Pastner	Conference USA
2024–25	Penny Hardaway	American

== Memphis Tigers in the NBA ==
Since the NBA draft began in 1947, 52 players from Memphis have been drafted, with an additional nine played after being signed as undrafted free agents. Of the 52 drafted players, 28 played in at least one NBA (or ABA) game. Memphis has produced 14 first-round picks, including 8 top-ten picks and one number-one pick (Derrick Rose). Three former Tigers have been named NBA All-Stars: Larry Kenon (twice), Penny Hardaway (4 times), and Derrick Rose (3 times). Four have gone on to win the NBA Championship: Win Wilfong with the St. Louis Hawks in 1958, William Bedford with the Detroit Pistons in 1990, Earl Barron with the Miami Heat in 2006, and James Wiseman with the Golden State Warriors in 2022. In 2010, Memphis became the second college to produce two consecutive NBA Rookie of the Year winners: Derrick Rose in 2009 and Tyreke Evans in 2010 (the first being North Carolina with winners Walter Davis in 1978 and Phil Ford in 1979). In 2011, Rose became the first former Tiger to be named the NBA Most Valuable Player. Many Memphis players since the 1960s that have gone undrafted or had unsuccessful NBA careers have also played in professional leagues in Europe, Asia and/or Latin America.

=== Current NBA Players ===
As of the 2025–26 NBA Season, six former Tigers are currently signed to NBA rosters.

- Precious Achiuwa, Sacramento Kings
- Jalen Duren, Detroit Pistons
- Josh Minott, Boston Celtics
- Nae'Qwan Tomlin, Cleveland Cavaliers
- David Jones-Garcia, San Antonio Spurs
- Moussa Cisse, Dallas Mavericks

== Memphis Tigers in International Competition ==
Memphis Tigers in International Competition
Player	Country	Year	Competition	Location	Finish	Ref
Elliot Perry	(United States) USA	1989	FIBA Americas Championship	Mexico City	Silver
Anfernee Hardaway^{[a]}	(United States) USA	1996	Olympic Games	Atlanta	Gold
Darius Washington Jr.^{[b]}	North Macedonia	2009	Eurobasket	Poland	2nd Round
Derrick Rose^{[a]}	(United States) USA	2010	FIBA World Championship	Turkey	Gold
Derrick Rose^{[a]}	(United States) USA	2014	FIBA World Championship	Spain	Gold
Precious Achiuwa^{[a]}	Nigeria	2021	Olympic Games	Tokyo	10th Place

European Championships
Player	Club (Tenure)	Championship(s)
Rich Jones	(Italy) Pallacanestro Varese (1969–1970)	1970 FIBA European Champions Cup
Joey Dorsey	(Greece) Olympiacos B.C. (2012)	2012 EuroLeague Champion

- ^{a} competed internationally as NBA players
- ^{b} Though American by birth, Washington is a naturalized citizen of North Macedonia (known before February 2019 as Macedonia) where he is known as Darius Vašington (Дариус Вашингтон).
- Adonis Thomas (born 1993), basketball player in the Israeli Basketball Premier League

== Retired jerseys ==
The University of Memphis has retired nine jerseys. Chris Douglas-Roberts, guard/forward from 2005 to 2008, declined the University of Memphis' invitation to have his #14 jersey retired in 2017.

Memphis Tigers retired numbers
No.	Player	Pos.	Tenure	Ref.
13	Forest Arnold	C	1952–56	
21	Larry Finch	SG	1970–73	
22	Win Wilfong	SG	1955–57	
24	Keith Lee	PF	1981–85	
25	Penny Hardaway (Note: Jayden Hardaway, guard/forward from 2018 to present and son of head coach Penny Hardaway, has worn his father's #25 in his Redshirt, Freshman, Junior and Senior seasons (he wore #1 in his Sophomore season).)	PG	1991–93	
33	Ronnie Robinson	PF	1970–73	
34	Elliot Perry	PG	1987–91	
35	Larry Kenon	PF	1972–73	
44	John Gunn (Note: John Gunn succumbed to Stevens–Johnson syndrome on December 21, 1976. He had been diagnosed with the rare disease only three games into the 1976 season.)	C	1974–76	
55	Lorenzen Wright	C	1994–96	
