= 1980 Missouri Valley Conference men's basketball tournament =

- Classification: Division I
- Season: 1979–80
- Teams: 8
- Site: Robertson Memorial Field House; Peoria, Illinois
- Champions: Bradley (1st title)
- Winning coach: Dick Versace (1st title)

1979–80 Missouri Valley Conference men's basketball standings
	Conf.				Overall
Team	W		L	PCT	W		L	PCT
Bradley †	13	–	3	.813	23	–	10	.697
Creighton	9	–	7	.563	16	–	12	.571
West Texas State	9	–	7	.563	19	–	11	.633
Wichita State	9	–	7	.563	17	–	12	.586
Indiana State	8	–	8	.500	16	–	11	.593
New Mexico State	8	–	8	.500	17	–	10	.630
Drake	6	–	10	.375	15	–	12	.556
Tulsa	5	–	11	.313	8	–	19	.296
Southern Illinois	5	–	11	.313	9	–	17	.346
† 1980 MVC tournament winner Rankings from AP Poll

The 1980 Missouri Valley Conference men's basketball tournament was played after the conclusion of the 1979–1980 regular season at Robertson Memorial Field House on the campus of Bradley University in Peoria, Illinois.

The Bradley Braves defeated the West Texas State Buffaloes in the championship game, 62-59, and as a result won their first MVC Tournament title to earn an automatic bid to the 1980 NCAA tournament.

== Bracket ==
Quarterfinals; February 28, 1980
1	Bradley	97
8	Tulsa	76
4	Wichita State	82
5	Indiana State	70
2	Creighton	86
7	Drake	80
3	West Texas State	98
6	New Mexico State	87

Semifinals; February 29, 1980
1	Bradley	68
4	Wichita State	60
2	Creighton	67
3	West Texas State	83

Final; March 1, 1980
1	Bradley	62
3	West Texas State	59
