= Bob Vanatta =

American basketball coach and college athletics administrator

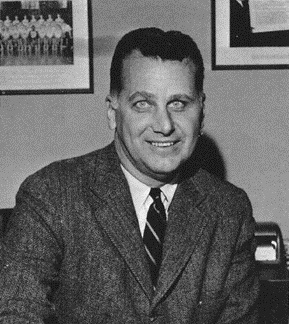
- Vanatta from The Savitar, 1963

Biographical details
- Born: July 7, 1918; Columbia, Missouri, U.S.
- Died: October 22, 2016 (aged 98); Jupiter, Florida, U.S.

Playing career
- 1943–1945: Central (MO)

Coaching career (HC unless noted)
- 1947–1950: Central (MO)
- 1950–1953: SW Missouri State
- 1953–1954: Army
- 1954–1956: Bradley
- 1956–1962: Memphis State
- 1962–1967: Missouri
- 1972–1973: Delta State

Administrative career (AD unless noted)
- 1956: Bradley
- 1973–1976: Oral Roberts
- 1976–1979: Ohio Valley Conference (comm.)
- 1979–1983: Trans America Athletic Conference (comm.)
- 1983–1986: Louisiana Tech
- 1986–1994: Sunshine State Conference (comm.)
- 1997–1999: Florida Atlantic (assoc. AD)

Head coaching record
- Overall: 333–200
- Tournaments: 2–2 (NCAA)

Accomplishments and honors

Championships
- 2× NAIA champion (1952, 1953)

Bob Vanatta (July 7, 1918 – October 22, 2016) was an American basketball coach and college athletics administrator. He was the head basketball coach for Central Methodist, Missouri State University, Army, Bradley, Memphis State, Missouri, and Delta State University. At Missouri State, he won the 1952 and 1953 NAIA Championships. He compiled a 109–34 record at Memphis State, including making it to the 1957 NIT Championship game. After coaching, he later served as athletic director at Oral Roberts University, commissioner of the Ohio Valley Conference, commissioner of the Atlantic Sun Conference, executive director of the Independence Bowl, athletic director at Louisiana Tech University, commissioner of the Sunshine State Conference, president of the NCAA Division II Conference Commissioner's Association, and associate athletic director at Florida Atlantic University. He was a Palm Beach County Sports Commission member, which presents the Lou Groza Award to the nation's top placekicker.

Vanatta died October 22, 2016, aged 98, in Melbourne, Florida.

== Head coaching record ==
Record table
Season	Team	Overall	Conference	Standing	Postseason
Central Eagles (Independent) (1947–1950)
Central:		61–20 (.753)			
Southwest Missouri State Bears (Mid–America Intercollegiate Athletics Association) (1950–1953)
1950–51	Southwest Missouri State	22–3	7–3	2nd	
1951–52	Southwest Missouri State	27–5	10–0	1st	NAIA Champions
1952–53	Southwest Missouri State	24–4	8–2	1st	NAIA Champions
Southwest Missouri State:		73–12 (.857)	25–5 (.833)		
Army Cadets (Independent) (1953–1954)
1953–54	Army	15–7			
Army:		15–7 (.682)			
Bradley Braves (Independent) (1954–1955)
1954–55	Bradley	9–20			NCAA Elite Eight
Bradley Braves (Missouri Valley Conference) (1955–1956)
1955–56	Bradley	13–13			
Bradley:		22–33 (.400)			
Memphis State Tigers (Independent) (1956–1962)
1956–57	Memphis State	24–6			NIT Finals
1957–58	Memphis State	15–7			
1958–59	Memphis State	17–6			
1959–60	Memphis State	18–5			NIT First Round
1960–61	Memphis State	20–3			NIT Quarterfinals
1961–62	Memphis State	15–7			NCAA first round
Memphis State:		109–34 (.762)			
Missouri Tigers (Big Eight Conference) (1962–1967)
1962–63	Missouri	10–15	5–9	T–6th	
1963–64	Missouri	13–11	7–7	T–4th	
1964–65	Missouri	13–11	8–6	T–3rd	
1965–66	Missouri	3–21	1–13	8th	
1966–67	Missouri	3–22	1–13	8th	
Missouri:		42–80 (.344)	22–48 (.314)		
Delta State Statesmen (Gulf States Conference) (1972–1973)
1972–73	Delta State	11–14	4–10		
Delta State:		11–14 (.440)	4–10 (.286)		
Total:		333–200 (.625)			
National champion Postseason invitational champion Conference regular season champion Conference regular season and conference tournament champion Division regular season champion Division regular season and conference tournament champion Conference tournament champion
