= Missouri Valley Conference Men's Basketball Coach of the Year =

Annual collegiate award

- Awarded for: the most outstanding basketball head coach in the Missouri Valley Conference
- Country: United States

History
- First award: 1949
- Most recent: Casey Alexander, Belmont

The Missouri Valley Conference Men's Basketball Coach of the Year is an annual basketball award given to the Missouri Valley Conference's most outstanding head coach. The award was first given following the 1948–49 season.

As of 2022, among current members, Drake has the most all–time awards with nine, and Bradley has the most individual recipients with six. There have been three ties for the coach of the year (1969, 1973 and 1987); there have been fourteen repeat winners in the award's history. Two coaches have won the award three consecutive times—Maury John of Drake in 1968–1970 and Gregg Marshall of Wichita State in 2012–2014. The only current MVC members without a winner are Valparaiso, which played its first conference season in 2017–18, and the three programs that start MVC play in 2022–23—Belmont, Murray State, and UIC.

== Key ==
†	Co-Coaches of the Year
Coach (X)	Denotes the number of times the coach has been awarded the Coach of the Year award at that point

== Winners ==
Season	Coach	School
1948–49	Henry Iba	Oklahoma A&M
1949–50	Forddy Anderson	Bradley
1950–51	Henry Iba (2)	Oklahoma A&M
1951–52	Eddie Hickey	Saint Louis
1952–53	Henry Iba (3)	Oklahoma A&M
1953–54	Ralph Miller	Wichita State
1954–55	Clarence Iba	Tulsa
1955–56	Alden Pasche	Houston
1956–57	Eddie Hickey (2)	Saint Louis
1957–58	George Smith	Cincinnati
1958–59	George Smith (2)	Cincinnati
1959–60	Chuck Orsborn	Bradley
1960–61	Ed Jucker	Cincinnati
1961–62	Chuck Orsborn (2)	Bradley
1962–63	Ed Jucker (2)	Cincinnati
1963–64	Maury John	Drake
1964–65	Gary Thompson	Wichita State
1965–66	Tay Baker	Cincinnati
1966–67	Joe Swank	Tulsa
1967–68	Maury John (2)	Drake
1968–69†	Ken Hayes	Tulsa
1968–69†	Maury John (3)	Drake
1969–70	Maury John (4)	Drake
1970–71	Bob Polk	Saint Louis
1971–72	Gene Bartow	Memphis State
1972–73†	Ken Hayes (2)	Tulsa
1972–73†	Denny Crum	Louisville
1973–74	Joe Stowell	Bradley
1974–75	Lou Henson	New Mexico State
1975–76	Ron Ekker	West Texas State
1976–77	Ken Hayes (3)	New Mexico State
1977–78	Tom Apke	Creighton
1978–79	Bill Hodges	Indiana State
1979–80	Dick Versace	Bradley
1980–81	Nolan Richardson	Tulsa
1981–82	Gary Garner	Drake
1982–83	Weldon Drew	New Mexico State
1983–84	Bob Donewald	Illinois State
1984–85	Nolan Richardson (2)	Tulsa
1985–86	Dick Versace (2)	Bradley
1986–87†	J. D. Barnett	Tulsa
1986–87†	Eddie Fogler	Wichita State
1987–88	Stan Albeck	Bradley
1988–89	Tony Barone	Creighton
1989–90	Rich Herrin	Southern Illinois
1990–91	Tates Locke	Indiana State
1991–92	Bob Bender	Illinois State
1992–93	Rudy Washington	Drake
1993–94	Tubby Smith	Tulsa
1994–95	Tubby Smith (2)	Tulsa
1995–96	Jim Molinari	Bradley
1996–97	Eldon Miller	Northern Iowa
1997–98	Kevin Stallings	Illinois State
1998–99	Jim Crews	Evansville
1999–00	Royce Waltman	Indiana State
2000–01	Dana Altman	Creighton
2001–02	Dana Altman (2)	Creighton
2002–03	Bruce Weber	Southern Illinois
2003–04	Matt Painter	Southern Illinois
2004–05	Chris Lowery	Southern Illinois
2005–06	Mark Turgeon	Wichita State
2006–07	Chris Lowery (2)	Southern Illinois
2007–08	Keno Davis	Drake
2008–09	Ben Jacobson	Northern Iowa
2009–10	Ben Jacobson (2)	Northern Iowa
2010–11	Cuonzo Martin	Missouri State
2011–12	Gregg Marshall	Wichita State
2012–13	Gregg Marshall (2)	Wichita State
2013–14	Gregg Marshall (3)	Wichita State
2014–15	Ben Jacobson (3)	Northern Iowa
2015–16	Barry Hinson	Southern Illinois
2016–17	Dan Muller	Illinois State
2017–18	Porter Moser	Loyola
2018–19	Darian DeVries	Drake
2019–20	Ben Jacobson (4)	Northern Iowa
2020–21	Darian DeVries (2)	Drake
2021–22	Ben Jacobson (5)	Northern Iowa
2022–23	Brian Wardle	Bradley
2023-24	Josh Schertz	Indiana State
2024-25	Ben McCollum	Drake
2025-26	Casey Alexander	Belmont

== Winners by current member schools ==
Years of joining for each school are the actual calendar years of entry, which normally occurs on July 1 of the stated calendar year. Years of awards reflect the end of the basketball season.

School (year joined)	Winners	Years
Drake (1907/1956) (Note: Bradley University and Drake University left the MVC during the 1951–52 school year in protest over the Johnny Bright incident, a racially motivated attack by a white Oklahoma A&M football player against Drake's black star Johnny Bright. Bradley returned to the conference in 1955 and Drake a year later.)	10	1964, 1968, 1969†, 1970, 1982, 1993, 2008, 2019, 2021, 2025
Bradley (1948/1955)	9	1950, 1960, 1962, 1974, 1980, 1986, 1988, 1996, 2023
Northern Iowa (1991)	6	1997, 2009, 2010, 2015, 2020, 2022
Southern Illinois (1975)	6	1990, 2003, 2004, 2005, 2007, 2016
Illinois State (1981)	4	1984, 1992, 1998, 2017
Indiana State (1977)	4	1979, 1991, 2000, 2024
Evansville (1994)	1	1999
Missouri State (1990)	1	2011
Belmont (2022)	1	2026
Murray State (2022)	0	—
UIC (2022)	0	—
Valparaiso (2017)	0	—

Footnotes

== Winners from former members ==
School (years in MVC)	Winners	Years received
Tulsa (1935–1996)	9	1955, 1967, 1969†, 1973†, 1981, 1985, 1987†, 1994, 1995
Wichita State (1949–2017)	7	1954, 1965, 1987†, 2006, 2012, 2013, 2014
Cincinnati (1957–1970)	5	1958, 1959, 1961, 1963, 1966
Creighton (1928–1946, 1976–2013)	4	1978, 1989, 2001, 2002
New Mexico State (1970–1983)	3	1975, 1977, 1983
Oklahoma A&M (1925–1956) (Note: Known as Oklahoma State since 1957.)	3	1949, 1951, 1953
Saint Louis (1937–1974)	3	1952, 1957, 1971
Houston (1951–1959)	1	1956
Louisville (1964–1975) (Note: Although Louisville joined the MVC in 1963, its men's basketball team did not start conference play until the 1964–65 season.)	1	1973†
Loyola (2013–2022)	1	2018
Memphis State (1968–1973) (Note: Known as Memphis since 1994.)	1	1972
West Texas State (1972–1986) (Note: Known as West Texas A&M since 1990.)	1	1976

Footnotes
