= Wayne Yates =

American basketball player and coach (1937–2022)

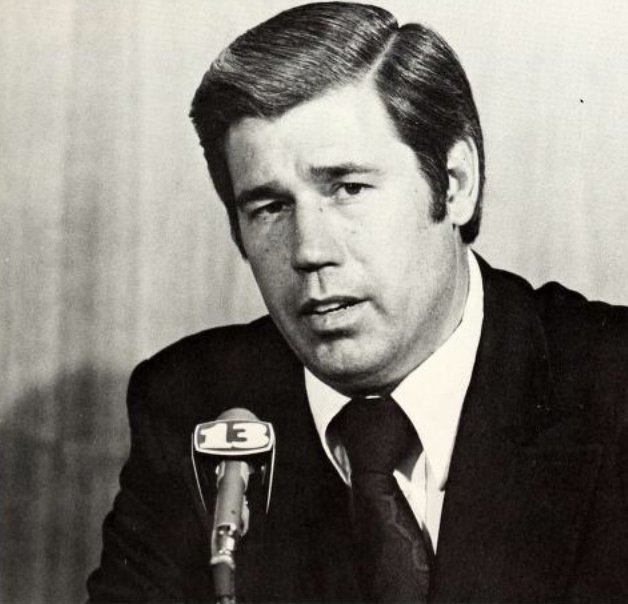
- Yates from the 1974 Desoto

Personal information
- Born: November 7, 1937 Gurdon, Arkansas, U.S.
- Died: August 16, 2022 (aged 84) Natchitoches, Louisiana, U.S.
- Listed height: 6 ft 8 in (2.03 m)
- Listed weight: 235 lb (107 kg)

Career information
- High school: North Little Rock (North Little Rock, Arkansas)
- College: New Mexico State (1956–1958); Memphis (1959–1961)
- NBA draft: 1961: 1st round, 5th overall pick
- Drafted by: Los Angeles Lakers
- Playing career: 1961–1962
- Position: Center
- Number: 55
- Coaching career: 1969–1985

Career history

Playing
- 1961–1962: Los Angeles Lakers
- 1962: Oakland Oaks

Coaching
- 1969–1974: Memphis State (assistant)
- 1974–1979: Memphis State
- 1980–1985: Northwestern State

Career highlights
- As player: First-team All-Border Conference (1958)
- Stats at NBA.com
- Stats at Basketball Reference

Wayne Edward Yates (November 7, 1937 – August 16, 2022) was an American professional basketball player who played 37 games for the Los Angeles Lakers in one National Basketball Association (NBA) season in 1961–62. He later worked as a college basketball coach, most notably at Memphis State University (now the University of Memphis).

== Early life ==
Yates was born in Gurdon, Arkansas, on November 7, 1937. He attended North Little Rock High School in nearby North Little Rock, and played basketball for its school team. He initially studied at New Mexico State University (NMSU), where he played for the Aggies and received first team all-Border Conference honors as a sophomore in 1957–58. After two years at NMSU, he transferred to Memphis State University. He consequently sat out the 1958–59 season per NCAA transfer rules, before averaging 5.3 points and 4.0 rebounds per game with the Memphis Tigers during his junior year. He then led the team with 17.5 points and 14.4 rebounds as a senior, and helped the Tigers to a berth in the 1961 National Invitation Tournament. At the end of the season, Yates earned first-team All-America honors from The New York Times, as well as an honorable mention from Converse.

== Professional career ==
After finishing his college career at Memphis State, Yates was selected in the first round (fifth overall selection) of the 1961 NBA draft by the Los Angeles Lakers. He made his NBA debut on October 27, 1961, recording one rebound and attempting one field goal against the Detroit Pistons. He ultimately played only one season in the NBA, backing up All-Star Rudy LaRusso in 1961–62 NBA season. He averaged 1.9 points and 2.5 rebounds in 37 games in a season shortened by injury. In the offseason, he was traded to the Saint Louis Hawks for future draft picks.

Instead of reporting to the Hawks, Yates signed with the Oakland Oaks of the fledgeling American Basketball League. While Yates found a productive role with the team, averaging 10.7 points and 8.7 rebounds per game, the league folded before the season ended. He was subsequently invited to the New York Knicks training camp prior to the 1963–64 NBA season. However, he did not make the team.

== Coaching career ==
Yates returned to his alma mater, Memphis State, as an assistant to head coach Moe Iba in 1969. When Iba was dismissed in 1970, new coach Gene Bartow retained Yates as an assistant. Yates helped Memphis State to their first Final Four, as the upstart Tigers made it all the way to the 1973 NCAA tournament final, losing to UCLA. After one more season, Bartow left for Illinois and Yates was elevated to head coach.

The young coach had a successful tenure at Memphis State, leading the Tigers to three straight postseason appearances and four straight 19+ win seasons. However, a subpar 1978–79 season, allegations of NCAA violations, and the academic suspension of Tigers star Tony Rufus all led to Yates announcing his resignation on February 8, 1979. He was eventually replaced by Dana Kirk at the conclusion of the season. His final record in five seasons at Memphis was 111–49.

After a year off from coaching, Yates was named head coach at Northwestern State University in 1980. He coached there for five seasons, finishing with a 48–67 record at the school. Yates resigned following a 3–25 season in 1984–85.

== Personal life ==
Yates was married to Harriet Ardala "Dala" Harding Yates until her death. Together, they had four children.

Yates died on August 16, 2022, in Natchitoches, Louisiana. He was 84 years old.

== Career statistics ==
Legend
GP	Games played	GS	Games started	MPG	Minutes per game
FG%	Field goal percentage	3P%	3-point field goal percentage	FT%	Free throw percentage
RPG	Rebounds per game	APG	Assists per game	SPG	Steals per game
BPG	Blocks per game	PPG	Points per game	**Bold**	Career high

=== NBA ===
==== Regular season ====
Year	Team	GP	MPG	FG%	FT%	RPG	APG	PPG
1961–62	L.A. Lakers	37	7.1	.295	.455	2.5	.4	1.9

=== Playoffs ===
Year	Team	GP	MPG	FG%	FT%	RPG	APG	PPG
1962	L.A. Lakers	4	3.0	.375	.500	1.3	.3	1.8

== Head coaching record ==
Record table
Season	Team	Overall	Conference	Standing	Postseason
**Memphis State Tigers** (NCAA Division I Independent) (1974–1975)
1974–75	Memphis State	20–7			NIT First Round
**Memphis State Tigers** (Metro Conference) (1975–1979)
1975–76	Memphis State	21–9	1–1	4th	NCAA Division I First Round
1976–77	Memphis State	20–9	3–4	T–5th	NIT First Round
1977–78	Memphis State	19–9	7–5	3rd	
1978–79	Memphis State	13–15	5–5	3rd	
Memphis State:		93–49	15–15		
**Northwestern State Demons** (Trans America Athletic Conference) (1980–1984)
1980–81	Northwestern State	11–17	5–7	7th	
1981–82	Northwestern State	19–9	10–6	2nd	
1982–83	Northwestern State	9–19	5–9	7th	
1983–84	Northwestern State	6–22	2–12	8th	
**Northwestern State Demons** (Gulf Star Conference) (1984–1985)
1984–85	Northwestern State	3–25	2–8	6th	
Northwestern Louisiana:		48–92	24–42		
Total:		141–141			
