= Jim Molinari =

American basketball coach and lawyer (born 1954)

Current position
- Title: Assistant Coach
- Team: Old Dominion
- Conference: Sun Belt

Biographical details
- Born: December 26, 1954 (age 71); Chicago, Illinois, U.S.

Playing career
- 1973–1975: Kansas State
- 1975–1977: Illinois Wesleyan
- Position: Point guard

Coaching career (HC unless noted)
- 1979–1989: DePaul (assistant)
- 1989–1991: Northern Illinois
- 1991–2002: Bradley
- 2004–2006: Minnesota (assistant)
- 2006–2007: Minnesota (interim HC)
- 2007–2008: Ball State (assistant)
- 2008–2014: Western Illinois
- 2014–2019: Nebraska (assistant)
- 2019–2021: Oklahoma (assistant)
- 2021–2026: Boston College (assistant)
- 2026-present: Old Dominion (assistant)

Head coaching record
- Overall: 302–290 (.510)
- Tournaments: 0–2 (NCAA Division I); 4–5 (NIT); 0–2 (CBI)

Accomplishments and honors

Championships
- 2 MCC/Summit League regular season (1991, 2013); MVC regular season (1996)

Awards
- 2× MCC/Summit League Coach of the Year (1991, 2013); MVC Coach of the Year (1996)

James Richard Molinari (born December 26, 1954) is an assistant men’s basketball coach for the Old Dominion Monarchs. Molinari was most recently an assistant coach at Boston College. Prior to his stint at Boston College, Molinari was an assistant coach at Oklahoma from 2019 to 2021. He formerly served as an assistant coach at Nebraska and as former head coach of the Western Illinois University Leathernecks, where he served from 2008 to 2014. Prior to being named coach at WIU, Molinari was as assistant coach at Ball State University after serving as the interim head coach at the University of Minnesota, replacing Dan Monson on November 30, 2006, and being succeeded by Tubby Smith on March 22, 2007. Previously, he served as head men's basketball coach at Northern Illinois University and Bradley University. He also was a scout for the Toronto Raptors and Miami Heat.

Molinari graduated from Glenbard West High School, where he starred on its varsity boys' basketball team. He first attended Kansas State University from 1973 to 1975, lettering twice with Jack Hartman's Wildcats. A 6'1" (1.85 meters) guard who wore uniform number 30, he appeared in 22 games, including a 95–87 defeat to Syracuse in the NCAA East Regional Final at the Providence Civic Center on March 22, 1975. He transferred to Illinois Wesleyan University for his last two undergraduate years. A reserve who averaged 9.1 points per game, he was a teammate of Jack Sikma in both seasons. He earned a Bachelor of Arts in English in 1977.

Molinari graduated from the DePaul University College of Law, earning his juris doctor in 1980. He passed the Bar Exam. Molinari spent eleven seasons as an assistant coach for both Ray and Joey Meyer at DePaul University.

His first head coaching assignment began on April 28, 1989, when he replaced Jim Rosborough at Northern Illinois University (NIU). A combined 42–17 in his two seasons at NIU, the Huskies finished the 1990–91 campaign with the second-best team defense in the nation which allowed 57.5 points a game, a program-best 25–6 record and an at-large bid to the NCAA Division I men's basketball tournament.

He succeeded Stan Albeck in a similar capacity at Bradley University on April 12, 1991. He inherited a program which had at least 20 losses in each of the previous two years. After going a combined 18–39 in Molinari's first two seasons at Bradley, the Braves had at least 20 wins in each of the three subsequent years. His most successful campaign was 1995–96 when he was named the Missouri Valley Conference (MVC) Coach of the Year and the Braves earned an at-large bid to the NCAA tournament. He had a 174–152 record in eleven seasons at Bradley which also included five National Invitation Tournament (NIT) appearances in 1994, 1995, 1997, 1999 and 2001. Despite having the longest tenure among MVC men's basketball head coaches at the time, he was fired on March 5, 2002, after a 9–20 finish. The dismissal was driven by David Broski's dissatisfaction over the Braves' 42–48 record during the three years he had been university president at that point. Molinari was replaced by Jim Les a month later on April 7.

== Head coaching record ==
Record table
Season	Team	Overall	Conference	Standing	Postseason
Northern Illinois Huskies (NCAA Division I Independent) (1989–1990)
1989–90	Northern Illinois	17–11			
Northern Illinois Huskies (Mid-Continent Conference) (1990–1991)
1990–91	Northern Illinois	25–6	14–2	1st	NCAA Division I First Round
Northern Illinois:		42–17 (.712)	14–2 (.875)		
Bradley Braves (Missouri Valley Conference) (1991–2002)
1991–92	Bradley	7–23	3–15	9th	
1992–93	Bradley	11–16	7–11	7th	
1993–94	Bradley	23–8	14–4	2nd	NIT Quarterfinal
1994–95	Bradley	20–10	12–6	4th	NIT Second Round
1995–96	Bradley	22–8	15–3	1st	NCAA Division I First Round
1996–97	Bradley	17–13	12–6	2nd	NIT Second Round
1997–98	Bradley	15–14	9–9	5th	
1998–99	Bradley	17–12	11–7	2nd	NIT First Round
1999–00	Bradley	14–16	10–8	5th	
2000–01	Bradley	19–12	12–6	2nd	NIT First Round
2001–02	Bradley	9–20	5–13	8th	
Bradley:		174–152 (.534)	110–88 (.556)		
Minnesota Golden Gophers (Big Ten Conference) (2006–2007)
2006–07	Minnesota	7–17 (Note: Molinari was named interim head coach upon the firing of Dan Monson on November 30, 2006 and coached the remainder of the season.)	3–13	9th	
Minnesota:		7–17 (.292)	3–13 (.188)		
Western Illinois Leathernecks (Summit League) (2008–2014)
2008–09	Western Illinois	9–20	6–12	T–8th	
2009–10	Western Illinois	13–17	6–12	T–7th	
2010–11	Western Illinois	7–23	2–16	9th	
2011–12	Western Illinois	18–15	9–9	T–4th	CBI First Round
2012–13	Western Illinois	22–9	13–3	T–1st	CBI First Round
2013–14	Western Illinois	10–20	4–10	7th	
Western Illinois:		79–104 (.432)	40–62 (.392)		
Total:		302–290 (.510)			
National champion Postseason invitational champion Conference regular season champion Conference regular season and conference tournament champion Division regular season champion Division regular season and conference tournament champion Conference tournament champion
