= 1964 National Invitation Tournament =

College basketball tournament in the US

- Season: 1963–64
- Teams: 12
- Finals site: Madison Square Garden, New York City
- Champions: Bradley Braves (3rd title)
- Runner-up: New Mexico Lobos (1st title game)
- Semifinalists: Army Black Knights (1st semifinal); NYU Violets (4th semifinal)
- Winning coach: Chuck Orsborn (3rd title)
- MVP: Levern Tart (Bradley)

The 1964 National Invitation Tournament was the 1964 edition of the annual NCAA college basketball competition.

== Selected teams ==
Below is a list of the 12 teams selected for the tournament.

- Army
- Bradley
- DePaul
- Drake
- Duquesne
- Miami (FL)
- New Mexico
- NYU
- Pittsburgh
- Saint Joseph's
- St. Bonaventure
- Syracuse

== Bracket ==
Below is the tournament bracket.

First round
Saint Joseph's	86
Miami (FL)	76
Army	64
St. Bonaventure	62
Drake	87
Pittsburgh	82
NYU	77
Syracuse	68

Quarterfinals
Saint Joseph's	81
Bradley	83
Duquesne	65
Army	67
Drake	60
New Mexico	65
DePaul	66
NYU	79

Semifinals
Bradley	67
Army	52
New Mexico	72
NYU	65

Finals
Bradley	86
New Mexico	54

Third place game
Army	60
NYU	59

== See also ==
- 1964 NCAA University Division basketball tournament
- 1964 NCAA College Division basketball tournament
- 1964 NAIA Division I men's basketball tournament
