= Joe Stowell =

American basketball coach and broadcaster (1926–2026)

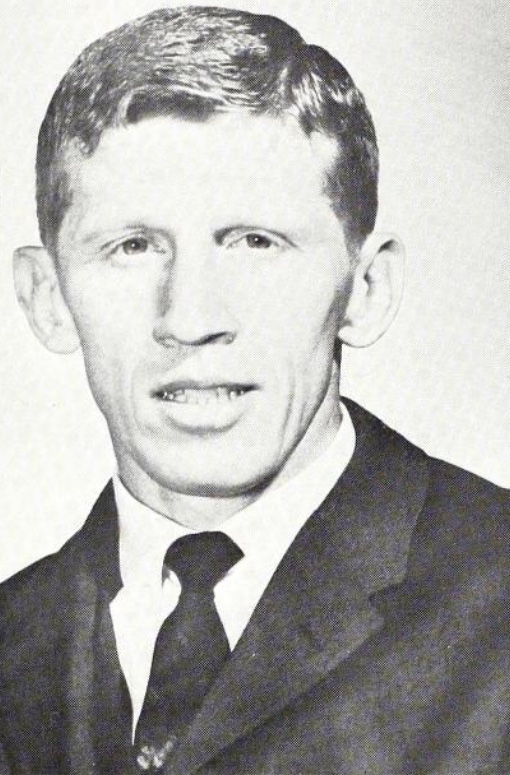
- Stowell from the 1967 Anaga

Biographical details
- Born: December 24, 1926
- Died: February 14, 2026 (aged 99)

Playing career
- 1947–1950: Bradley

Coaching career (HC unless noted)
- 1956–1965: Bradley (assistant)
- 1965–1978: Bradley

Head coaching record
- Overall: 197–147

Accomplishments and honors

Awards
- MVC Coach of the Year (1974)

Joseph R. Stowell (December 24, 1926 – February 14, 2026) was an American college basketball coach and broadcaster. After attending Bradley University and playing on the basketball team from 1947 to 1950, he returned as an assistant coach in 1956 and became Bradley's ninth head coach in 1965. During his thirteen seasons as Bradley's head coach he won 197 games. He was fired as head coach in 1978. His basketball resume also features two seasons coaching high school boys and two years coaching the Bradley University women. In 1985 Stowell joined Dave Snell as a WMBD (AM) broadcaster for Bradley basketball games, and worked in that position until 2010. Born on December 24, 1926, Stowell died on February 14, 2026, at the age of 99.
