= Chuck Orsborn =

Basketball player (1917–2017)

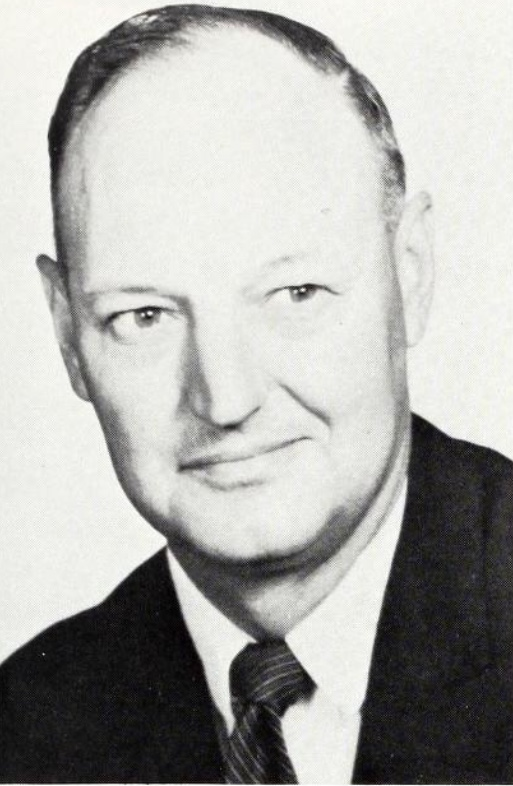
- Orsborn from the 1967 Anaga

Biographical details
- Born: November 17, 1917
- Died: May 7, 2017 (aged 99); Naples, Florida, U.S.

Playing career
- 1936–1939: Bradley

Coaching career (HC unless noted)
- 1947–1956: Bradley (assistant)
- 1956–1965: Bradley

Administrative career (AD unless noted)
- 1965–1978: Bradley

Head coaching record
- Overall: 194–56 (.776)
- Tournaments: 11–4 (NIT)

Accomplishments and honors

Championships
- 3 NIT (1957, 1960, 1964); MVC regular season (1962)

Awards
- 2× MVC Coach of the Year (1960, 1962)

Charles K. Orsborn (November 17, 1917 – May 7, 2017), known as "Chuck" or "Ozzy," was an American college basketball player, head coach, and the athletic director of Bradley University.

== Playing career and World War II ==
Orsborn was a four-sport athlete at Bradley. He played basketball for Bradley from 1935 to 1939 and was part of the "Famous Five" teams that launched the school to prominence. While Orsborn was on the team, the Braves played in the first two National Invitation Tournaments in 1938 and 1939 and were invited to the NCAA tournament in 1939.

Orsborn was drafted by the New York Yankees in 1939 and played in the minor leagues with beginning in 1939 with the Neosho Yankees and then the Sioux Falls Canaries. In 1941, after his season with Sioux Falls, he enlisted in the Army Air Corps, serving five years and attaining the rank of Lieutenant Colonel.

== Coaching career ==
Orsborn returned to Bradley as an assistant coach from 1947 to 1956, which included two NCAA runner-up finishes. In 1956, he was elevated to head coach. From 1956 to 1965, he compiled a won-loss record of 194–56 (.774). During this time, the Braves won three NIT championships. During this nine-year span, the Braves also earned six Associated Press top 20 finishes, Orsborn was named Missouri Valley Conference coach of the year in 1960 and 1962. Orsborn also has the distinction of recording his first 100 victories in 120 games, which is sixth on the all-time list for college coaches.

In 1965, Orsborn took the position of Bradley's director of athletics and served in that function until 1978.

== Later life ==
Orsborn was inducted into the N.I.T., MVC, and Greater Peoria halls of fame and was named Bradley's "Coach of the Century" in 2002. He also has an award named after him: "The Charles Orsborn Award" given to the Bradley senior who best exemplifies outstanding achievement in athletics and academics.

Orsborn, who was in poor health in his final years, died in Naples, Florida, on May 7, 2017, at the age of 99. He was preceded in death by his wife and two sons and was survived by his daughter.

== Head coaching record ==
Record table
Season	Team	Overall	Conference	Standing	Postseason
Bradley Braves (Missouri Valley Conference) (1956–1965)
1956–57	Bradley	22–7	9–5	2nd	NIT Champion
1957–58	Bradley	20–7	12–2	2nd	NIT Quarterfinals
1958–59	Bradley	25–4	12–2	2nd	NIT Runner-up
1959–60	Bradley	27–2	12–2	2nd	NIT Champion
1960–61	Bradley	21–5	9–3	2nd	
1961–62	Bradley	21–7	10–2	T–1st	NIT Quarterfinals
1962–63	Bradley	17–9	6–6	T–3rd	
1963–64	Bradley	23–6	7–5	3rd	NIT Champion
1964–65	Bradley	18–9	9–5	T–2nd	NIT First Round
Bradley:		194–56 (.776)	86–32 (.729)		
Total:		194–56 (.776)			
National champion Postseason invitational champion Conference regular season champion Conference regular season and conference tournament champion Division regular season champion Division regular season and conference tournament champion Conference tournament champion
