= Brian Wardle (basketball) =

American basketball coach (born 1979)

Current position
- Title: Head coach
- Team: Bradley
- Conference: MVC
- Record: 207–160 (.564)

Biographical details
- Born: October 9, 1979 (age 47); Clarendon Hills, Illinois, U.S.

Playing career
- 1997–2001: Marquette
- 2001–2002: Fayetteville Patriots
- 2002–2003: Rockford Lightning

Coaching career (HC unless noted)
- 2005–2010: Green Bay (assistant)
- 2010–2015: Green Bay
- 2015–present: Bradley

Administrative career (AD unless noted)
- 2003–2005: Marquette (DOBO)

Head coaching record
- Overall: 302–225 (.573)
- Tournaments: NCAA: 0–1; NIT: 3–6; CIT: 0–1

Accomplishments and honors

Championships
- Horizon League regular season (2014); 2x MVC tournament (2019, 2020); MVC regular season (2023)

Awards
- MVC Coach of the Year (2023); Horizon League Coach of the Year (2014); Skip Prosser Man of the Year Award (2014); First-team All-Conference USA (2001)

Brian M. Wardle (born October 9, 1979) is an American college basketball coach and the current men's basketball coach at Bradley University.

== Early life and education ==
Born in Clarendon Hills, Illinois, Wardle graduated from Hinsdale Central High School in nearby Hinsdale in 1997. At Hinsdale Central, Wardle earned two all-state basketball honors and broke scoring and rebounding records in school history. After high school, Wardle played for Marquette University at guard from 1997 to 2001, under head coach Mike Deane from 1997 to 1999 and Tom Crean from 1999 to 2001. In four seasons, Wardle played 117 games with 93 starts. As a senior in 2000–01, Wardle was Marquette's leading scorer with 18.8 points per game; he would end his college career as the no. 3 all-time leading scorer at Marquette.

== Professional basketball career ==
After college, Wardle played in the NBA Developmental League and the Continental Basketball Association. Selected by the Fayetteville Patriots in the third round, 17th overall, in the 2001 NBDL draft, Wardle played 45 games with 19 starts for the Patriots in 2001–02, averaging 2.6 points, 1.6 rebounds, and 0.8 assists in 11.9 minutes per game.

Then in the 2002–03 season, Wardle played for the Rockford Lightning of the Continental Basketball Association. In 41 games with 17 starts, Wardle averaged 11.7 points, 3.1 rebounds, and 2.0 assists.

== Coaching career ==
Returning to Marquette, Wardle was director of basketball operations under Tom Crean from 2003 to 2005 and an assistant coach at UW-Green Bay from 2005 to 2010. After the 2009–2010 season, Wardle was named head coach at UW-Green Bay. Upon his hiring, Wardle became the youngest head coach in NCAA Division I basketball. In 2014, Wardle was named the Horizon League Coach of the Year. In 2015, he left to take the coaching job at Bradley, which posted a 9–24 record the season before his arrival and a 5–27 record after the year in which he arrived. He had a 95–65 record at Green Bay but failed to make the NCAA Tournament.

On March 10, 2019, Wardle led the Braves to the NCAA Tournament by winning The Missouri Valley's “Arch Madness” Tournament. The Braves defeated Northern Iowa 57–54. This is the first conference tournament championship for Bradley since 1988, and the first trip to the NCAA Tournament for Bradley since 2006. Bradley played two seeded Michigan State on March 21, 2019. Wardle was asked to keep wearing a red pair of shoes his wife had bought him. Wardle, claiming he wasn't superstitious, "everyone else is," wore his red shoes. Bradley was 8–0 when Wardle wore these shoes. Bradley led Michigan State at half 35–34, dominating the boards in the first half. Bradley lost the game 76–65.

Prior to Bradley's NCAA Tournament game against Michigan State, Wardle was involved in a controversy that gained national attention. A Bradley Athletics official revoked media access to a local beat reporter due to not "promoting the Bradley brand." Wardle later apologized and the reporter's access to the team was restored.

== Head coaching record ==
Record table
Season	Team	Overall	Conference	Standing	Postseason
Green Bay Phoenix (Horizon League) (2010–2015)
2010–11	Green Bay	14–18	8–10	7th	
2011–12	Green Bay	15–15	10–8	T–6th	
2012–13	Green Bay	18–16	10–6	T–3rd	CIT First Round
2013–14	Green Bay	24–7	14–2	1st	NIT First Round
2014–15	Green Bay	24–9	12–4	2nd	NIT First Round
Green Bay:		95–65 (.594)	54–30 (.643)		
Bradley Braves (Missouri Valley Conference) (2015–present)
2015–16	Bradley	5–27	3–15	9th	
2016–17	Bradley	13–20	7–11	T–6th	
2017–18	Bradley	20–13	9–9	5th	
2018–19	Bradley	20–15	9–9	T–5th	NCAA Division I Round of 64
2019–20	Bradley	23–11	11–7	T–3rd	NCAA canceled
2020–21	Bradley	12–16	6–12	8th	
2021–22	Bradley	17–14	11–7	5th	
2022–23	Bradley	25–10	16–4	1st	NIT First Round
2023–24	Bradley	23–12	13–7	3rd	NIT Second Round
2024–25	Bradley	28–9	15–5	2nd	NIT Quarterfinals
2025–26	Bradley	21–13	13–7	2nd	NIT First Round
2026–27	Bradley	0–0	0–0		
Bradley:		207–160 (.564)	113–93 (.549)		
Total:		302–225 (.573)			
National champion Postseason invitational champion Conference regular season champion Conference regular season and conference tournament champion Division regular season champion Division regular season and conference tournament champion Conference tournament champion
