= Dick Versace =

American basketball coach (1940–2022)

Personal information
- Born: April 16, 1940 Fort Bragg, North Carolina, U.S.
- Died: February 25, 2022 (aged 81) Chicago, Illinois, U.S.
- Listed height: 6 ft 0 in (1.83 m)
- Listed weight: 195 lb (88 kg)

Career information
- High school: Gordon Tech (Chicago, Illinois)
- College: Wisconsin
- Coaching career: 1964–1998

Career history

Coaching
- 1965–1969: St. Joseph HS
- 1969–1973: Gordon Tech
- 1973–1974: Saint Louis (assistant)
- 1974–1977: Michigan State (assistant)
- 1977–1978: Jackson Community College
- 1978–1986: Bradley
- 1986–1988: Detroit Pistons (assistant)
- 1988–1990: Indiana Pacers
- 1996–1998: Milwaukee Bucks (assistant)

Career highlights
- NIT champion (1982); 3× MVC regular season champion (1980, 1982, 1986); MVC tournament champion (1980); Henry Iba Award (1986); 2× MVC Coach of the Year (1980, 1986)

Richard Patrick Versace (/vɜːrˈseɪs/; April 16, 1940 – February 25, 2022) was an American basketball coach and executive. He was also the first American of Puerto Rican descent to have coached a National Basketball Association (NBA) team.

== Early life ==
Versace was born in Fort Bragg, North Carolina. His parents were Colonel Humbert Joseph Versace, an Italian American, and Marie Teresa Rios, a Puerto Rican-Irish American author. The 1960s television sitcom The Flying Nun was based on one of her books. He attended the University of Wisconsin–Madison, though he did not play basketball.

Versace coached at the high school and collegiate level and in the NBA. Versace coached at St. Joseph High School in Kenosha, Wisconsin, and Gordon Tech in Chicago. Oddly, his first coaching position after college was at Forrest-Strawn-Wing High School in the small Central Illinois community of Forrest during the years of 1964 and 1965. The odd thing being that he was the head football coach. He led the team to an 8–1 record and a Vermilion Valley Conference championship. He coached junior varsity basketball that winter. Versace began his college coaching career at St. Louis University in 1973, after compiling a 204–66 record at the high school coaching level. He then moved to Michigan State University, where he was heavily involved in the recruitment of Magic Johnson. Versace's first head coaching assignment was at the Jackson Community College in 1976. In the early 1980s, he was head men's basketball coach at Bradley University, where he led the team to the 1982 NIT championship. In the 1985-86 season, he was named National College Coach of the Year by the U.S. Basketball Writers' Association. That year, his Bradley Braves went 32–3 and were ranked as high as #7 in the nation during the season. His back court players included future NBA star Hersey Hawkins and future Bradley head coach Jim Les.

== College ==
Versace became the head coach at Bradley University in 1978 and remained at Bradley until 1986. In his second season at Bradley the team finished first in the Missouri Valley Conference and qualifying for the NCAA tournament. Losing in the first round to Texas A&M. In 1981–82 Bradley finished first in the MVC but lost in the semifinals of the MVC tournament. They were not selected to the NCAA tournament but won the NIT championship. In Versace's final season at Bradley they finished 32–3 for the season and 16–0 in the MVC, eventually losing in the second round of the NCAA tournament to eventual champion Louisville.

== Head coaching record ==
=== College ===
Record table
Season	Coach	Overall	Conference	Standing	Postseason
Bradley Braves (Missouri Valley Conference) (1978–1986)
1978–79	Bradley	9–17	3–13	T–8th	
1979–80	Bradley	23–10	13–3	1st	NCAA Division I first round
1980–81	Bradley	18–9	10–6	T–4th	
1981–82	Bradley	26–10	13–3	1st	NIT champions
1982–83	Bradley	16–13	10–8	5th	
1983–84	Bradley	15–13	7–9	T–5th	
1984–85	Bradley	17–13	9–7	T–4th	
1985–86	Bradley	32–3	16–0	1st	NCAA Division I second round
Bradley:		156–88 (.639)	81–49 (.623)		
Total:		156–88 (.639)			
National champion Postseason invitational champion Conference regular season champion Conference regular season and conference tournament champion Division regular season champion Division regular season and conference tournament champion Conference tournament champion

=== NBA ===
Team	Year	G	W	L	W–L%	Finish	PG	PW	PL	PW–L%	Result
Indiana	1988–89	53	22	31	.415	6th in Central	—	—	—	—	Missed playoffs
Indiana	1989–90	82	42	40	.512	5th in Central	3	0	3	.000	Lost first round
Indiana	1990–91	25	9	16	.360	left mid-season					
Career		160	73	87	.456		3	0	3	.000	

== NBA ==
He later served as an assistant coach for the Detroit Pistons under head coach Chuck Daly. Versace then became head coach of the Indiana Pacers for two years, from 1988 through 1990. After leaving the Pacers job, Versace was a sportscaster on TNT from 1992 to 1997 and on WMAQ TV in Chicago. While at TNT, Dick was mostly paired with Jim Durham whenever he did analysis, and during the 1996–97 season he also added sideline reporting to his role at TNT. Versace served as an assistant coach for the Milwaukee Bucks during the 1997–98 season.

In 1999, Versace was named President of Basketball Operations for the then-Vancouver Grizzlies. After Versace's first season in Vancouver, the Grizzlies were relocated and became the Memphis Grizzlies. And in 2002, the Grizzlies hired NBA legend Jerry West as President of Basketball Operations, and Versace assumed the role of General Manager and remained with the team through the end of the 2004-2005 season. Prior to joining the Grizzlies, Versace worked for Michael Heisley's acquisition team as Versace oversaw Heisley's pursuit and ultimate purchase of the Vancouver Grizzlies.

== Later years ==
On October 8, 2007, Versace announced that he would run as a Democratic Party candidate for Illinois' 18th Congressional District seat, then held by Republican Congressman Ray LaHood who was retiring. On December 8, 2007, however, Versace announced that he would not be running due to "unforeseen personal circumstances."

== Personal life and death ==
Versace was the brother of Vietnam War posthumous Medal of Honor recipient Rocky Versace, who was executed by the Viet Cong while a Prisoner of War in 1965. He had two other brothers, Dr. Stephen Versace (his twin) and Michael Versace Rios, and a sister, Trilby Versace. Versace was divorced and had two children, David and Julie. He died on February 25, 2022, at the age of 81.

== See also ==
- List of notable Puerto Ricans
- Sports in Puerto Rico
