= 1957 National Invitation Tournament =

Annual NCAA basketball competition

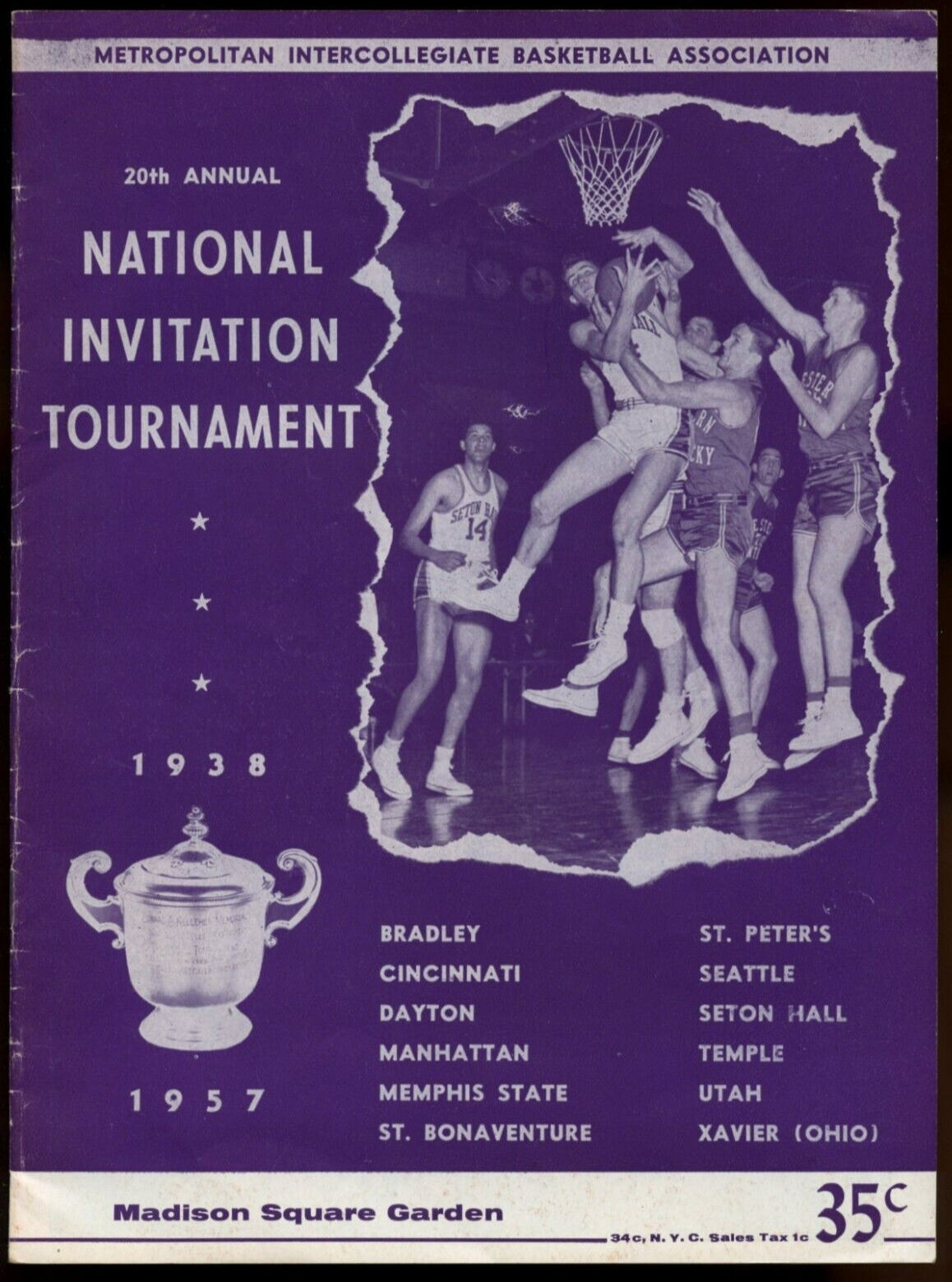
- Season: 1956–57
- Teams: 12
- Finals site: Madison Square Garden, New York City
- Champions: Bradley Braves (1st title)
- Runner-up: Memphis Tigers (1st title game)
- Semifinalists: Temple Owls (2nd semifinal); St. Bonaventure Bonnies (2nd semifinal)
- Winning coach: Chuck Orsborn (1st title)
- MVP: Win Wilfong (Memphis State)

The 1957 National Invitation Tournament was the 1957 edition of the annual NCAA college basketball competition.

== Selected teams ==
Below is a list of the 12 teams selected for the tournament.

- Bradley
- Cincinnati
- Dayton
- Manhattan
- Memphis
- St. Bonaventure
- Saint Peter's
- Seattle
- Seton Hall
- Temple
- Utah
- Xavier

== Bracket ==
Below is the tournament bracket.

First round
St. Bonaventure	90
Cincinnati	72
Memphis	77
Utah	75
Xavier	85
Seton Hall	79
Dayton	79
Saint Peter's	71

Quarterfinals
St. Bonaventure	85
Seattle	68
Manhattan	73
Memphis	85
Xavier	81
Bradley	116
Temple	77
Dayton	66

Semifinals
St. Bonaventure	78
Memphis	80
Bradley	94
Temple	66

Finals
Memphis	83
Bradley	84

Third place game
St. Bonaventure	50
Temple	67

== See also ==
- 1957 NCAA University Division basketball tournament
- 1957 NCAA College Division basketball tournament
- 1957 NAIA Basketball Tournament
