= 1960 National Invitation Tournament =

College basketball tournament in the United States

- Season: 1959–60
- Teams: 12
- Finals site: Madison Square Garden, New York City
- Champions: Bradley Braves (2nd title)
- Runner-up: Providence Friars (1st title game)
- Semifinalists: Utah State Aggies (1st semifinal); St. Bonaventure Bonnies (4th semifinal)
- Winning coach: Chuck Orsborn (2nd title)
- MVP: Lenny Wilkens (Providence)

The 1960 National Invitation Tournament was the 1960 edition of the annual NCAA college basketball competition.

== Selected teams ==
Below is a list of the 12 teams selected for the tournament.

- Bradley
- Dayton
- Detroit
- Holy Cross
- Memphis
- Providence
- St. Bonaventure
- St. John's
- Saint Louis
- Temple
- Utah State
- Villanova

== Bracket ==
Below is the tournament bracket.

First round
Villanova	88
Detroit	86
Providence	71
Memphis	70
Dayton	72
Temple	51
St. Bonaventure	94
Holy Cross	81

Quarterfinals
Villanova	72
Utah State	73
Saint Louis	53
Providence	64
Dayton	64
Bradley	78
St. John's	71
St. Bonaventure	106

Semifinals
Utah State	62
Providence	68
Bradley	82
St. Bonaventure	71

Finals
Providence	72
Bradley	88

Third place game
Utah State	99
St. Bonaventure	83

== See also ==
- 1960 NCAA University Division basketball tournament
- 1960 NCAA College Division basketball tournament
- 1960 NAIA Division I men's basketball tournament
