= 1961 National Invitation Tournament =

Annual NCAA basketball competition

- Season: 1960–61
- Teams: 12
- Finals site: Madison Square Garden, New York City
- Champions: Providence Friars (1st title)
- Runner-up: Saint Louis Billikens (2nd title game)
- Semifinalists: Holy Cross Crusaders (2nd semifinal); Dayton Flyers (6th semifinal)
- Winning coach: Joe Mullaney (1st title)
- MVP: Vin Ernst (Providence)

The 1961 National Invitation Tournament was the 1961 edition of the annual NCAA college basketball competition.

== Selected teams ==
Below is a list of the 12 teams selected for the tournament.

- Army
- Colorado State
- Dayton
- DePaul
- Detroit
- Holy Cross
- Memphis
- Miami (FL)
- Niagara
- Providence
- Saint Louis
- Temple

== Bracket ==
Below is the tournament bracket.

First round
Saint Louis	58
Miami (FL)	56
Temple	79
Army	66
Holy Cross	86
Detroit	82
Providence	73
DePaul	67

Quarterfinals
Saint Louis	59
Colorado State	53
Dayton	62
Temple	60
Holy Cross	81
Memphis	69
Niagara	68
Providence	71

Semifinals
Saint Louis	67
Dayton	60
Holy Cross	83
Providence	90

Finals
Saint Louis	59
Providence	62

Third place game
Dayton	67
Holy Cross	85

== See also ==
- 1961 NCAA University Division basketball tournament
- 1961 NCAA College Division basketball tournament
- 1961 NAIA Division I men's basketball tournament
