= Marguerite Humeau =

French artist living in London (born 1986)

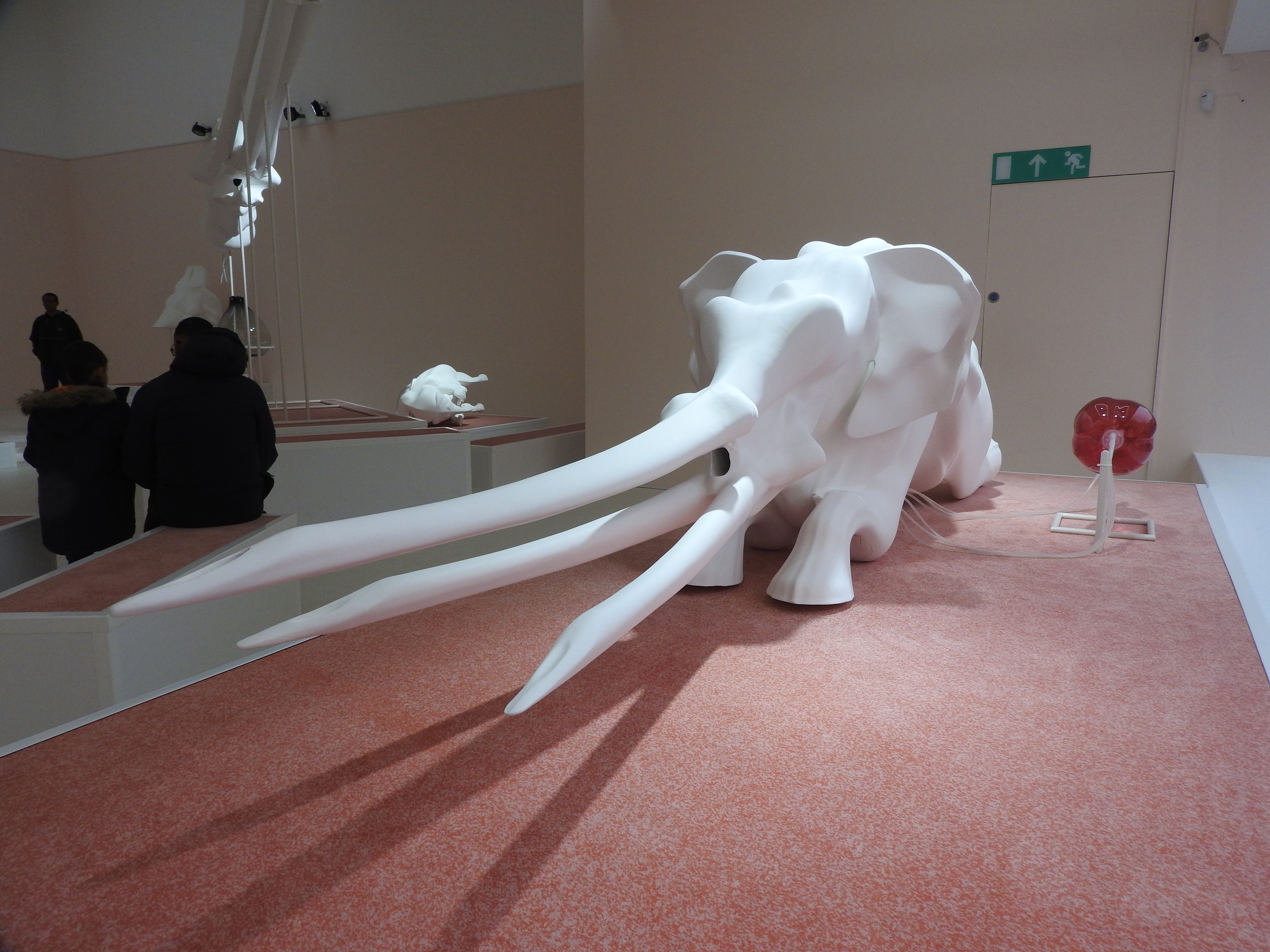
*Echo*, a matriarch engineered to die. Materials: Polystyrene, white paint, acrylic parts, latex, silicone, nylon, glass artificial heart, water pumps, water, potassium chloride, powder-coated metal stand, sound. Part of FOXP2, Nottingham Contemporary, 2016

Marguerite Humeau (born 1986) is a French visual artist. She lives in London.

== Early life and education ==
Humeau grew up in Beaupréau, France in 1986. Her mother is a painter, and took Humeau to museums and galleries as a young child.

Humeau studied at the École des Arts Appliqués (ENSAAMA) Paris and went on to study at the Design Academy in Eindhoven before her acceptance to the MA Design Interactions programme, led by Dunne & Raby, at the Royal College of Art, London. Humeau cites this programme as a key experience that inspired her artistic methodologies. The interdisciplinary nature of the programme, and its students allowed design and creation to be considered as informing essential questions about our relationship as humans to technological developments, and as a way to creatively approach future design of critical or speculative nature. This approach to artistic investigation inspired Humeau's method of working which aims to tackle great mysteries of human existence through the employment of extensive research methods with specialised experts, scientists, and people who hold traditional, oral, or nearly-extinct forms of knowledge. Humeau's speculations on the existence of extinct worlds, parallel presents, lost mental landscapes, or futures that have not come yet and the aspects that connect them to our own encourages audiences to ask questions surrounding what it means to be human.

The artist's representing gallery, White Cube, writes that the artist's work "Rang[es] from prehistory to imagined future worlds, Marguerite Humeau spans great distances in space and time in her pursuit of the mysteries of human existence. She breathes life into lost things, whether they be lifeforms that have become extinct or ideas that have disappeared from our mental landscapes. Filling gaps in knowledge with speculation and imagined scenarios, her aim is to create new mythologies for our contemporary era."

== The Opera of Prehistoric Creatures (2011-2012) ==
Humeau began work on this series as her graduation project from the RCA. Humeau aimed to bring the songs of prehistoric creatures (Mammoth Imperator (-4,5 MYA), Entelodont aka Terminator Pig (-25 MYA), Ambulocetus "Walking whale" (-50MYA), as well as Lucy (Australopithecus Afarensis (-3MYA)) back to life by reconstructing the larynx of each creature and echoing their voices inside her sculptures by breathing air into them. Lucy, from her Opera of Prehistoric Creatures, was included in The Universal Addressability of Dumb Things curated by Mark Leckey in 2013.

Through conversations with palaeontologists, zoologists and radiologists, Humeau melded forgotten ecosystems with our own by filling in absences caused by extinction. Humeau collaborated with audio developer Julien Bloit so that the creatures were able to listen to one another, and generate more and more complex songs as they evolved during the time of the exhibition.

== Echoes (2015) ==
Echoes was a work that navigated questions of what it means to explore the spectrum between life and death, and how these divides between realms become more complicated in light of technological developments. For Echoes, the exhibition space was "transformed into part temple, part laboratory for the industrial production of an elixir for eternal life".

Humeau resuscitated the voice of Queen Cleopatra to sing a love song from her era, a cappella, in the nine languages that she would have spoken and that are all extinct today. In this way, Humeau explored what it means to be alive without a physical body, and how far the physical body can be abstracted, or if one can exist without a physical envelope.

The installation also featured two sculptures that were inspired by two Ancient Egyptian gods related to fertility, Wadjet (King Cobra) and Taweret, reimagined as animals on a production line. Wadjet (King Cobra) was injecting itself with its own venom to create its own antidote, and Taweret was producing an elixir of life from various animal bodily fluids such as hippopotamus milk. Humeau used deadly yellow black mamba python venom to cover the entire gallery space, referencing the death of Cleopatra. This exhibition was a key moment for the artist, and was shown again at the Tate Britain in 2017–2018.

== FOXP2 (2016) ==
Humeau's FOXP2 was a series of work displayed at the Palais de Tokyo for the artist's first museum show. The installation was based around research surrounding the genetic evolutions that allowed humans to develop language, and the single mutation of the FOXP2 gene that is supposed to set humans apart from non-human animals. For this show, Humeau created a two-part installation.

The first part was entitled The History of Humankind, An artificial voice is beatboxing the origin of human language before joining a choir of 108 billion voices. This is the number of humans who have ever lived on Earth since the beginning of humankind, 100 000 years ago. The voice was heard as if it was metamorphosing following the mutation of the FOXP2 gene, and followed visitors through the corridors of the exhibition, evoking human experiences on Earth through natural landscapes and the birth of language. It seemed to meander in the maze through which humans access the second chapter of this installation, that Humeau called a "biological showroom".

In this second chapter, Humeau imagined a speculated world wherein this gene was not developed in humans but in elephants. Presented around the central event of the death of an elephant matriarch, Humeau explored the various ways in which her imagined ecosystem would form around collective mourning. Whilst the dying heartbeat of the elephant matriarch was giving the rhythm for the elephant's family wake, each member of her family gathered around her was developing sophisticated forms of language, emotions, and behaviour.

== Poumon B12 (2018) ==
Humeau was commissioned by Rebecca Lamarche-Vadel to install an artificial lung in a burned Paris apartment. The lung contained B12, a vitamin usually given to people that are suffering the aftereffects of having been in a fire.

== Ecstasies (2019) ==
Humeau's show Ecstasies at Kunstverein Hamburg, acting in sequence to the exhibition Birth Canal at the New Museum in 2018–2019, extended the artist's interest in engaging with extinct cultures and ecosystems. The research conducted by anthropologist Bethe Hagens was a primary inspiration for this series of works. In particular, Hagens's thesis that Paleolithic Venus figures may have not been art pieces, but instead recipes for the ingestion of various animal brains that were supposed to contain psychoactive substances. The sculptures that were created navigated the transformations between the earthly female body, the divine and the animal.

Each sculpted figure had a voice attached to it that was recreated through a cappella singing as if through a seance. The singers were asked to embody either natural elements or the sounds of animals to perform and push their voice to test boundaries of the physical shell of their bodies. The exhibition also featured diagrams and works on paper that explored these shamanic journeys and their effects on brain activity further. The installation was set up as a reconstitution of an early trance, and the heating system of the museum was connected to the "brain" of the exhibition, synchronising voices together and inviting the audience to do the same. Specially designed mattresses were scattered around the space, and long singing notes at specific frequencies were designed for humans to dive into a meditation state.

== Mist (2019) ==
This series of work explored how the disastrous effects of climate change and the mass deaths that this phenomenon causes in the animal kingdom could trigger non-human animals to become spiritual. Humeau questions the facets of humanity that have been used to set us apart from other animals and interrogates whether they are legitimate, referencing the behaviours of non-human animals that might indicate an understanding of spirituality that already exists in the animal kingdom. As highlighted in Studio International’s interview with the artist, Humeau’s show High Tide at the Centre Pompidou in 2019 continued these themes and displayed a series of marine mammals, dancing and praying. One of them, entitled The Myth Teller, was an invisible marine mammal, heard travelling through space, that was using language attributed to the whales and dolphins that we are familiar with, clicks and whistles, to react to an imagined human-induced great flood that created their society.

Humeau’s Migrations series consisted of three large-scale sculptures displayed at the 59th International Art Exhibition of La Biennale di Venezia, The Milk of Dreams, curated by Cecilia Alemani in 2022. In connection to the themes Humeau explored with Mist and High Tide, Migrations navigates non-human animal reactions to climate change in the Venetian context with the highest rates of flooding the city has seen in the 21st century. The works El Niño, La Niña and Kuroshio, named after ocean currents, discuss the displacement of water and its effects on ecosystems. These works were constructed from "biological and synthetic resin and polymers, salt, algae, seaweed, bone, pigments, mineral dust, ocean plastic, glass and stainless steel."

== Surface Horizon (2021) ==
Surface Horizon was displayed at Lafayette Anticipations in 2021, and signified Humeau's foray into other mediums outside of sculpture and sound work. Surface Horizon explored forgotten ecosystems and in particular, referenced the idea of the ‘surface horizon’ as the layer of soil underneath the surface where significant transformations in the natural world occur. This layer is where dead matter on the surface decomposes and is reborn, imagined in this body of work as a place where humans could find answers for new ways of being in the world.

Humeau's inspiration for this work includes the doctrine of signatures, the idea that plants which resemble certain parts of the body could be used to treat specific ailments. Humeau studied this theory closely with the help of Julia Graves. The exhibition featured a clairvoyant who would guide visitors through their own ‘surface horizons’, reimagining the soil layer as a psychological place. Greenhouses also hosted plants, so-called "weeds" that are bio-indicators, likened to oracles by the artist as they predict the futures of the landscapes in which they grow. Humeau also connected with forager Lucia Stuart to create an elixir entitled "What is dormant in you?" and accompanied a tea set from which it could be served. Humeau also created a series of pastel drawings that she likened to "mancies", visions of beings in full metamorphosis in the Surface Horizon.

== Rise (2021) ==
Rise was Humeau's first site-specific commission, produced for the Sandretto Re Rebaudengo Art Park and placed at the top of San Licerio Hill alongside the Nebbiolo vines which produce the grapes used in their production of wine. Humeau's work was based on research conducted surrounding the local area and the botanical anatomy of a vine's flowers.

The hermaphroditic anatomy of the Sativa subspecies of flower means that the male and female elements converge once the flowers are gathered. Rise reimagines this encounter, an experience that is translated in a queer, monumental sculpture hand-painted by Humeau in shades of local wines, referencing a "tree of life". Humeau's research for the project involved conversations with wine producers, healers, geologists and specialists in alchemic traditions, renewable energies and botanists.

== Energy Flows (2021) ==
This body of work expanded on the themes explored in Surface Horizon such as the ‘doctrine of signatures’, and explored the connections between plants and herbal remedies or elixirs. The exhibition's press release highlights Humeau's choice of "organisms that can act as our guides… connecting them further to human emotions that don't have a linguistic denominator." Inspired by John Koenig's Dictionary of Obscure Sorrows, the ways in which we exist, how we feel emotions that are not defined, and do not understand are the intersections that Humeau aims to uncover. This point in Humeau's career signalled the introduction of natural and decomposing materials in the artist's works.

== meys (2023) ==
Humeau's exhibition at White Cube in London explored the forms of life that would last beyond human existence. Inspired by insects such as termites that live in collective communities, Humeau reflected on how humans could learn from insect societies. The exhibition was separated into three rooms.

The first room displayed a ceramic work produced in ‘collaboration’ with deceased artist Adam Kossowski. His sculpture, The History of Old Kent Road, (1965) was placed outside of the Peckham Civic Centre, which is now to be demolished. Humeau used the Artificial Intelligence programme GPT3 to recreate conversations with Kossowski, establishing collaborations in the afterlife at a time where the centre was about to cease existing. The work brought together the notion of collective community, a central theme throughout the exhibition. Tiles for a new ceramic panel were made in collaboration with a ceramic community centre.

The second chapter, taking place in a tunnel opened between two of the galleries, showed a film produced in collaboration with Dall-E AI, examining the ritual dances of termites around a spiral fungus and allowing visitors to trace their journeys. As detailed by the press release, this part of the work is titled Collective Effervescence in reference to Emile Durkheim's notion of a society bonding together through "common thought, to participate in a communal action."

In the third room, human audiences were invited to experience a future in which we have become collective bodies. "Guardians" cast in beeswax and carved in wood in various states of decomposition, were witnessed in a gathering of collective bodies inspired by natural architecture. Taking inspiration from bees and wasp nests as well as termite mounds - the work ultimately aims to make the viewer a witness to a constantly evolving ecosystem that is attempting to find equilibrium. Hand-blown glass elements held by each Guardian contained the ingredients for an elixir of collectiveness, such as honey collected from the gallery's rooftop, ancient and new yeast, wasp venom, and Termitomyces, the termite mushroom. The sound piece for the exhibition was made from music recorded from a single saxophone by Bendik Giske. Each piece was set on its own loop, allowing chance to become the main actor in the synchronisation of this newly born ecosystem.

== Orisons (2023) ==
Orisons was a land art project in the San Luis Valley of Colorado, USA and spanning 160 acres. Humeau transformed «an unfarmable plot of land into a place of reverence, honoring its expansive history, existing ecosystem, and imaginable futures ». She melded both real and mythological ecosystems with a series of eighty-four kinetic, divinatory sculptures, inspired by local fauna and flora. "Humeau's work is staunchly uninterested in controlling or dominating the landscape." said Emily Watlington in Art in America. "Orisons celebrates all the lives that have lived in it, live in it, and will live in it. It is about the land and its inhabitants, visible or invisible. It's about celebrating human and non-human communities, all of which are part of the artwork.". Humeau collaborated with soil and plants experts from the NRCS, Sandhill Crane experts, Ute Mountain Ute Tribe of Towaoc members, land owners Jones Farm Organics, community members and geomancers who could read the landscapes. After meeting with the geomancers, it was revealed to Humeau that there were spirits trapped in this realm, roaming the land – amongst others a woman who died on the land in the 1850s as well as the spirits of Ancestral Puebloans. Humeau was also given other readings of the land, and the place where there were water lines, twists, or portals to other spaces and times. Humeau's divinatory sculptures were placed, reminiscent of acupuncture needles in specific places on the land, with the guidance of the geomancers and other experts, in a hope to reactivate the land, its histories, and possible futures, and intensify a space-time web that traverses the earthly and spiritual ecosystems. Other possible encounters included: a burial for a bird made of mud and dried flowers, "piles of bricks that Humeau calls "benches" constructed by architect Ronald Rael, painted debris, scattered bones, an abandoned cattleguard, kangaroo mouses and horned toads, Russian thistles and dormant seeds, as well as the infinite multitude of beings that have traversed, traverse or will traverse the land as one walked it. This continues exploration of the question of what forms of life will survive humans. The plants that thrive in the huge droughts could be seen as oracles, and the land may be seen as a portal to the future that is about to happen in our lifetime due to the devastating effects of climate change. In the artist's words, the land "is the artwork, and I wanted to celebrate it and every being on it, as well as reconnect it and its inhabitants with their presents, pasts and futures."

Continuing her exploration into questions of embodiment, and metamorphosis, Humeau worked with Shae Whitney of DRAM Apothecary to transform the land into an elixir that human visitors could absorb, consuming Orisons before or as they were entering it, with the hope that they would themselves merge within the landscape. Inspired by "flying ointments" fabled to induce ethereal visions and lucid dreams, the elixir was crafted by Dram Apothecary using plants foraged on Orisons. The elixir contained Grain Alcohol, Sweetgrass, Russian Thistle, Mugwort, Yarrow, Lambsquarters, Sandhill Crane Feather Spirit Essence, Sand Dunes Dust Spirit Essence.

Humeau also transformed the work and gave it a third embodiment, a piece of poetry, a guide that would allow visitors unable to experience the work physically to experience it in their mental landscapes.

Orisons was produced and curated by Black Cube, A Nomadic Art Museum.
