= Johann König =

Johann König may refer to:

- Johann König (painter) (1586–1642), German painter
- Johann Friedrich König (1619–1664), German Lutheran theologian
- Johann Balthasar König (1691–1758), German composer
- Johann Samuel König (1712–1757), German mathematician
- Johann Gerhard König (1728–1785), German botanist active in India
- Johann König (gymnast) (1932–2020), Austrian gymnast
- Johann König (art dealer) (born 1981), German art dealer

== See also ==
- Johanna König, German actress
- John Koenig (disambiguation)
