= New Mexico Lobos men's basketball =

Sports team of the University of New Mexico

New Mexico Lobos
2026–27 New Mexico Lobos men's basketball team
- University: University of New Mexico
- Head coach: Eric Olen (2nd season)
- Location: Albuquerque, New Mexico
- Arena: The Pit (capacity: 15,411)
- Conference: Mountain West
- Nickname: Lobos
- Colors: Cherry and silver
- Student section: The Howl Raisers
- All-time record: 1,641–1,212 (.575)

NCAA Division I tournament Sweet Sixteen
- 1968, 1974

NCAA Division I tournament appearances
- 1968, 1974, 1978, 1991, 1993, 1994, 1996, 1997, 1998, 1999, 2005, 2010, 2012, 2013, 2014, 2024, 2025

Conference tournament champions
- Western Athletic Conference; 1993, 1996 Mountain West Conference; 2005, 2012, 2013, 2014, 2024

Conference regular-season champions
- Border Conference; 1944, 1945 Western Athletic Conference; 1964, 1968, 1974, 1978, 1994 Mountain West Conference; 2009, 2010, 2012, 2013, 2025

Uniforms
Home	Away	Alternate

The New Mexico Lobos men's basketball team represents the University of New Mexico, competing in the Mountain West Conference (MWC) in NCAA Division I. The university established basketball as a varsity sport in 1899 and began competing with regional colleges after establishing an athletics department in 1920.

Lobo basketball first achieved national prominence after Bob King was hired as head coach in 1962. King transformed a moribund program into a consistent winner and produced future ABA MVP Mel Daniels. The Lobos won the Western Athletic Conference (WAC) championship in 1964 and 1968, making frequent appearances in national rankings. The team reached the NIT tournament final in 1964 and received its first bid to the NCAA tournament in 1968. The success of the program continued after King departed, winning WAC titles in 1974, 1978, and 1994, winning the conference tournament in 1993 and 1996, and regularly earning post-season tournament bids.

The Lobos became frequent participants in the NCAA tournament during the 1990s and have made 16 appearances overall, as well as 20 NIT appearances. They have won the MWC regular season championship and the conference tournament five times each. In addition to Daniels, other prominent players produced by the Lobo program include five-time NBA champion Michael Cooper, three-time NBA champion Luc Longley, NBA all-star Danny Granger, and Kenny Thomas.

The Lobos' home venue, known as "The Pit", is recognized as one of the best college basketball arenas in the country. The Pit opened in 1966 and the Lobos have been dominant playing there, winning over 80 percent of their games, while regularly placing among national leaders in attendance. The arena has frequently hosted NCAA tournament games, including the 1983 NCAA Final Four that featured one of the most memorable finishes in tournament history.

== History ==
=== Roy W. Johnson (1920–1960) ===
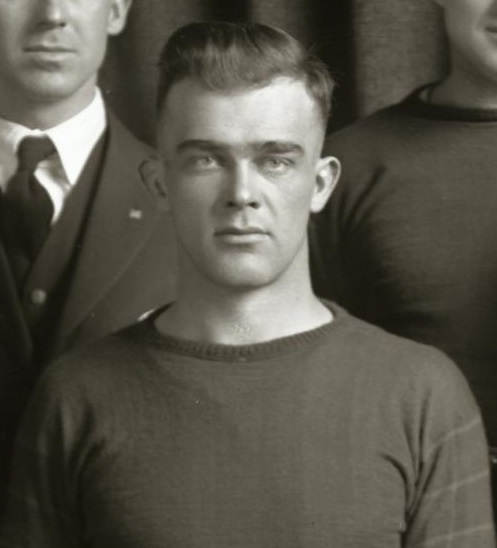
Roy W. Johnson

Roy Johnson, nicknamed "Old Iron Head", was fundamental to the early development of Lobo athletics. Johnson arrived in 1920 after a successful athletic career at the University of Michigan. The UNM gymnasium at the time was a small wooden building where the walls were out-of-bounds markers for basketball games. Basketball was primarily an intramural sport, with occasional games against other schools, including Albuquerque High School, and no regular schedule. Johnson set about building collegiate-level athletics facilities, performing some of the hard labor with his own hands. He oversaw construction of Carlisle Gymnasium in 1928 and Zimmerman Field in 1938, the first football stadium at UNM.

During his nearly 40 years at UNM, Johnson coached every men's sport the school offered, while teaching physical education. A decorated veteran who served in World Wars I and II, he was the UNM athletic director from 1920 to 1949. He established regularly scheduled games against regional colleges, and in 1931 UNM joined the Border Conference as a founding member. Johnson coached the UNM basketball team for all but two seasons from 1920 to 1940. From 1924 to 1934, his teams posted a 104–38 (.732) record. The Lobos won 165 games with Johnson as head basketball coach, a school record for over 30 years and currently third on its all-time list.

Johnson stepped down as head basketball coach after the 1939–40 season. The position passed to a few different coaches before Woody Clements took over 1944–51 and 1953–55, compiling a record of 113–119 (.487). The Lobos won the Border Conference in 1944 and 1945, and they appeared in the NAIA post-season tournament in 1947, losing to Hamline University in the first round. From 1951 to 1962, the Lobos competed in the Mountain States Conference, known at the time as the Skyline Eight. In 1957, while still on faculty, Johnson oversaw construction of the 7,800-seat arena that bears his name, Johnson Gymnasium. For many years, Johnson Gym was the most prominent feature of the UNM campus for those driving along Central Avenue in Albuquerque, part of historic U.S. Route 66.

=== Bob King (1962–1972) ===
Lobo basketball first achieved national prominence under Bob King, who was previously an assistant coach at his alma mater, the University of Iowa. The Lobos had only two winning seasons from 1947 to 1962, compiling a 113–252 (.310) record, including a dismal 42–149 (.220) during the last eight years. King had an immediate impact on the program. The Lobos won as many games in his first two seasons as in the previous seven combined and went 116–44 (.725) over his first six seasons. They went 175–89 (.663) in ten seasons with King as head coach, winning two conference titles and making four appearances in post-season tournaments.

New Mexico joined the Western Athletic Conference (WAC) as a founding member before King's first season. His first team went 16–9, the best Lobo record in 17 years. The following season, 1963–64, the Lobos won their first WAC championship, led by Ira Harge, who King had recruited from a junior college in Iowa. The team posted wins over Kansas and at Purdue and received a berth in the 1964 National Invitation Tournament (NIT) at Madison Square Garden in New York City. The Lobos defeated Drake and NYU before falling to Bradley in the championship game, finishing with a 23–6 record and ranked 16th in the UPI poll. Harge averaged 18.8 points and 11.8 rebounds a game during his two seasons at UNM and was selected in the second round of the 1964 NBA draft by the Philadelphia 76ers.

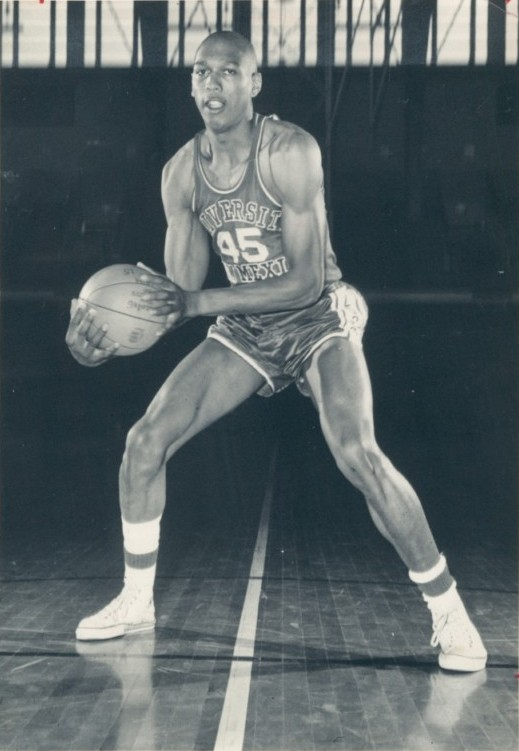
Mel Daniels

The rise of the program continued in the 1964–65 season, led by sophomores Mel Daniels and Ben Monroe. After an early loss at Kansas, the Lobos won ten straight, later building a 19–3 record and attaining a #10 national ranking, their first appearance in the AP poll. They dropped their next four games on the road, however, including a one-point loss at #10 BYU. They were again invited to the NIT, where they lost to St. John's to finish 19–8. Daniels averaged over 17 points and 11 rebounds a game, providing the fast-growing Lobo fan base a preview of things to come. Due to the success of King's first three seasons, attendance at Johnson Gym more than doubled, and plans to build a larger arena began to take shape. In the 1965–66 season, Daniels averaged 21 points and 10 rebounds a game, and the Lobos raced out to an 11–1 record after beating #7 BYU. They faltered down the stretch though and finished 16–8, completing the team's best four-year stretch in nearly forty seasons.

University Arena opened as the home venue of the Lobos on December 1, 1966. Because the playing surface is 37 feet below grade, students nicknamed the arena "The Pit," and the nickname stuck. The team began the 1966–67 season ranked 6th in the country and rose to #5 before winning at #2 UTEP, the defending national champion and highest-ranked team New Mexico had ever beaten at that point. The Lobos reached #3 with an 11–1 record but then lost four straight and fell out of the rankings. Despite a disappointing WAC campaign, they received a bid to the NIT. The Lobos beat Syracuse in the first round before losing to Rutgers, finishing the season 19–8 and ranked #18 in the UPI. Daniels averaged 21.5 points and 11.6 rebounds a game, finishing his career with a still-team record 44 double-doubles, and he became the first Lobo to be named as an All-American. He was selected as the ninth pick overall in the 1967 NBA draft by the Cincinnati Royals, but he chose to play in the fledgling American Basketball Association (ABA), becoming one of its greatest all-time players. He was named the first ABA Rookie of the Year in 1968, ABA Most Valuable Player in 1969 and 1971, and he led the Indiana Pacers to three ABA championships.

Stoking the popularity of Lobo basketball by this time was the success of two longtime rivals. New Mexico began playing New Mexico State in 1904, currently totaling over 200 games; they first played UTEP in 1929, with over 140 games total. Don Haskins took over at UTEP in 1961 and led the Miners to a 128–32 (.800) record in his first six seasons, including a 28–1 national championship season in 1965–66. New Mexico State hired Lou Henson as head coach in 1966, and like the Lobos under King, in his second season the Aggies began achieving national rankings and post-season tournament appearances. They went 74–14 (.841) from 1967 to 1970, including a 27–3 season in 1969–70 in which they were ranked in the top five most of the year, culminating in a Final Four appearance. The Lobos, Aggies, and Miners played one another twice every season, home-and-away, and a fierce rivalry grew among them. The teams were frequently ranked in national polls, giving their games a showdown quality extending beyond local bragging rights to the national stage.

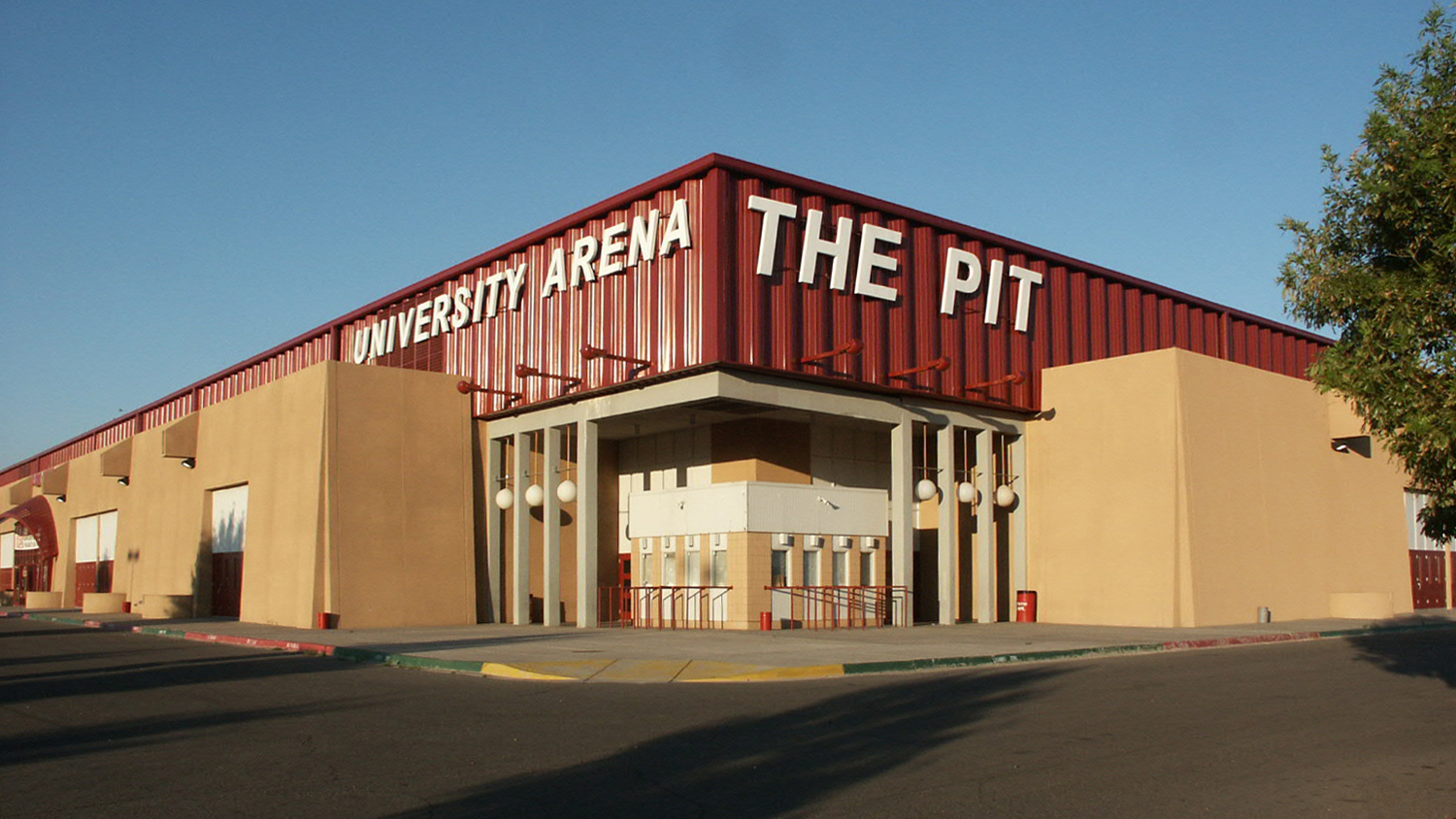
The Pit, formerly University Arena, in 2003

The Lobos lost Daniels and Monroe to graduation and were picked in the 1967–68 preseason to finish last in the WAC. Instead, they started the season 17–0, rising to #6 before beating #5 Utah in the Pit, propelling the Lobos to #4. Four starters averaged in double-figures in scoring, led by senior guard Ron Nelson at 19.5 points a game. They swept their regular season match-ups against New Mexico State, with both teams ranked in the top ten at the time of their second game. The Lobos won the WAC championship, Nelson was named a Helms All-American, and the Lobos earned their first NCAA tournament appearance. They entered the tournament 23–3 and ranked #6. They hosted their first-round game in The Pit but lost to unranked Santa Clara. Starting center Greg "Stretch" Howard was ineligible due to an NCAA rule disallowing transfers to play in postseason games; without his 14 points and 10 rebounds a game, the Lobos' balanced attack withered, and Nelson was their only consistent offense. Also playing in the first round at The Pit, New Mexico State lost to eventual champion UCLA, then won the consolation game over the Lobos, who finished the season 23–5.

The 1968–69 season began with high expectations and the Lobos ranked in the top ten, but they dropped out after a string of road losses. Howard led a young team, scoring 19.7 per game, with sophomores Willie Long and Petie Gibson beginning their runs as three-year starters. The Lobos swept #8 New Mexico State, with Gibson hitting a memorable last-second shot in the latter game, leading to a brief return to the national rankings. The team finished the season 17–9 but failed to receive an NIT berth. The Lobos slumped to a 42–36 record over the next three seasons. Long averaged 23.9 points a game both his junior and senior seasons, earning all-WAC honors both seasons and all-American recognition in 1971. He finished with career averages of 19.8 points and 10.2 rebounds per game, and his 23 double-doubles in 1969–70 still stands as the Lobo season record. Gibson compiled career averages of over 11 points and seven assists per game, still holding UNM records for career assists per game and four other assists categories.

After the 1971–72 season, assistant coach Norm Ellenberger was elevated to head coach, and King served as Assistant Athletics Director the next season. King then left to become head coach and Athletics Director at Indiana State University. In 1976, he recruited future Hall of Famer Larry Bird to ISU, where he led the Sycamores to a 48–12 record in his first two seasons. King suffered a heart attack and brain aneurysm shortly before Bird's senior season, however, and his assistant, Bill Hodges, led the team to the 1979 Final Four, where they lost to Michigan State in the championship game. King continued as AD until retiring the next year.

Bob King transformed the New Mexico program, becoming known as the "Architect of Lobo Basketball." Since his arrival at UNM, the Lobos have won over sixty percent of their games and earned over thirty berths to post-season tournaments, while suffering only five losing seasons. In 1992, UNM announced that the basketball court at University Arena would be named in honor of King. "Bob King Court" was dedicated at formal ceremonies on December 1, 1992, the 26th anniversary of the opening of The Pit. Coach King died on December 10, 2004.

=== Norm Ellenberger (1972–1979) ===
Under Norm Ellenberger, the Lobos won WAC championships in 1974 and 1978 and compiled an overall record of 134–62 (.684). Ellenberger was named head coach in March 1972 after serving as an assistant under King since 1967. It was Ellenberger's first Division I head coaching position, but he made up for what he lacked in experience with energy and enthusiasm. The program thrived, and Ellenberger became a local celebrity, restaurateur, and man-about-town, earning the nickname "Stormin' Norman" for his flashy attire and fiery coaching style.

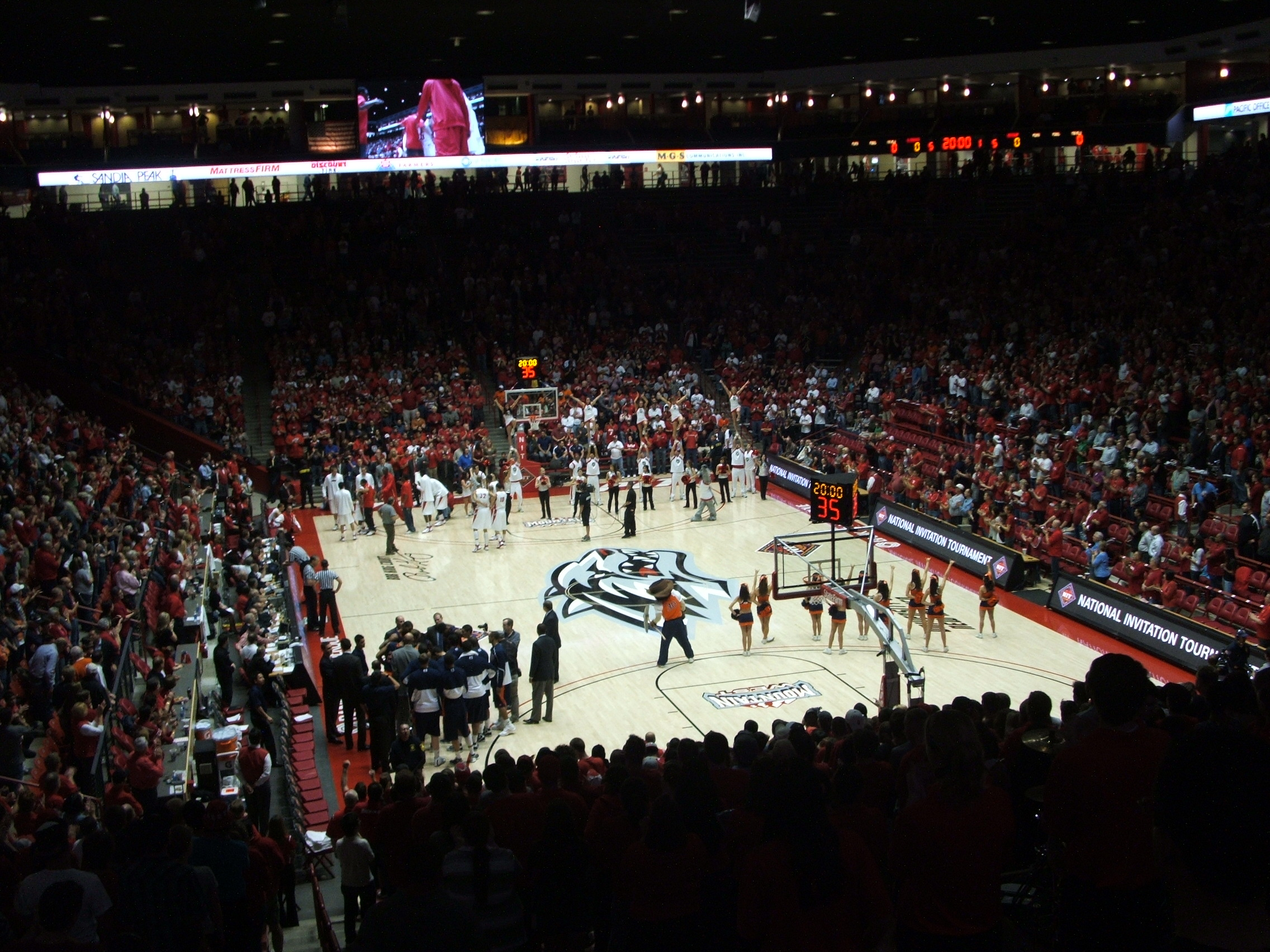
Bob King Court at The Pit

Like King, Ellenberger got off to a fast start in his first two seasons. In 1972–73, the Lobos raced out to a 9–0 record, including road wins at Oregon State and eventual Southwest Conference champion Texas Tech, leading to their first appearance in the national rankings in nearly four years. The team was led by the strong inside scoring and rebounding of Darryl Minniefield, Bernard Hardin, and Mark Saiers. In late February the Lobos were 21–3, ranked #15, and leading the WAC, before losing their last two games and finishing second in conference. The Lobos returned to the NIT, losing to eventual champion Virginia Tech and finishing 21–6.

The 1973–74 Lobos began the season 12–0, launching them to a #8 ranking. Hardin led the way, averaging 17 points a game, and the team became the highest scoring Lobo squad to date at over 84 points a game. Bill Hagins replaced Minniefield, and the team was again dominant inside. After a string of road losses, the Lobos recovered to win six of seven and secure the WAC championship in a strong season for the league when five of eight teams were ranked at some point. The Lobos earned their second trip to the NCAA tournament and tallied their first tournament victory, downing Idaho State before losing to San Francisco in the second round. They beat Dayton in the regional consolation game to finish the season 22–7 and ranked #18 in the UPI. Attendance at The Pit surged to its best ever, a trend that would continue throughout the Ellenberger years, regularly earning placement among the top five in the nation. The top six largest crowds ever at The Pit were during this period.

The 1974–75 Lobo team was depleted by graduation and slipped to a 13–13 record. Ellenberger began relying heavily on recruiting Junior College (JC) transfers, a tactic that would lead to his best season as Lobo coach but later to his downfall. The 1975–76 team improved to 16–11 with a largely mercenary squad of JC transfers who would later quit the team before the end of the season. A memorable highlight of the season was the first game in a brief but intense rivalry with UNLV before the teams were in the same conference. Ellenberger was well-respected as a teacher of defense, and he was a frequent participant in basketball coaching camps and workshops, where he became friends with UNLV coach Jerry Tarkanian. In January 1976, #4 UNLV survived a scare from the underdog Lobos before a Pit-record crowd of 19,452, with fans overflowing onto the concourse and sitting in the stairways, a game still lauded as one of the greatest and loudest ever in The Pit.

The 1976–77 team featured JC arrivals Michael Cooper, Marvin Johnson, and Willie Howard, the nucleus for a successful and exciting two-year run. Cooper is among the best overall players ever produced by the Lobo program and was named an All-American in 1978. He averaged 16 points and five rebounds a game as a Lobo, also leading the team in assists and steals. "Coop" later became a mainstay of the "Showtime" Los Angeles Lakers of the 1980s, winning five NBA championships over a 12-year career. His defensive prowess made him an eight-time recipient of NBA All-Defensive Team honors, as well as the Defensive Player of the Year Award in 1987. By contrast, Marvin "Automatic" Johnson was one of the greatest scorers in Lobo history. He became the fourth leading scorer in school history at the time in just two seasons, set single season records for total points, season points per game (24.0), career points per game (21.9), and he scored a still-school record 50 points in a single game. Willie Howard was a talented inside player averaging 13 points and six rebounds a game, frequently providing explosive scoring off the bench. Further JC transfers Jimmy Allen and Will Smiley completed a strong Lobo front line. The injection of talent made the Lobos exciting and competitive, but they took time to gel as a team, beginning the season 6–4 with a couple of disappointing losses. They beat Iowa and USC on the way to another showdown with #9 UNLV, losing a high-scoring game, then losing to #10 Arizona. The Lobos remained in the WAC race late in the season, but road struggles relegated them to third place and a 19–11 final record.

Before the 1977–78 season, Ellenberger installed what he called the "Equal Opportunity Motion Offense", a run-and-gun attack emphasizing picks and passing as players rotate through each position, taking advantage of his versatile, athletic lineup. The scheme also employed a full-court pressing, trapping defense to generate points off of turnovers. The team played at a frenetic pace and led the nation in scoring at 97.5 points per game. Phil Abney and Russell Saunders were JC additions; Abney initially backed up Howard but later moved into the starting line-up. The Lobos stood at 7–2 after losing to #10 Syracuse, then rattled off 14 straight wins, including a home-and-away sweep of #9 UNLV, pushing them into the national rankings and eventually into the top ten. Attendance at The Pit jumped to over 17,000 a game, second most in the nation, as fan enthusiasm soared. The Lobos won their fourth WAC championship with a 13–1 league record, losing only at ranked Utah, and entered the NCAA tournament ranked #5 and seeded second in the West Regional, with the opportunity to play in The Pit for the regional final with a win. They were upset in the first round by unranked Cal State Fullerton, however, in another disappointing tournament performance. The Lobos finished the season 24–4 and ranked #12, and Ellenberger was voted runner-up for the US Basketball Writers Coach of the Year award.

The 1978–79 Lobo squad returned starters Abney and Saunders while adding another strong JC class including Larry Belin. The team began the season 8–3 but struggled away from The Pit, losing its first seven road games. The team finally broke through, winning another exciting game at UNLV, beginning a string of nine wins in its last ten games. The strong finish earned the Lobos an NIT bid, where they lost to Texas A&M, finishing the season 19–10. The 1979–80 roster appeared once again loaded with talent, and fan expectations were again high, but disaster struck the program in the early weeks of the season as the "Lobogate" scandal unfolded. Leading players like Belin lost eligibility and were dropped from the team. Ellenberger was fired on December 17, 1979, and the season continued with the remaining players not caught up in the scandal, along with several walk-ons.

==== Lobogate ====
The "Lobogate" scandal involved forged academic transcripts, payments made for bogus Junior College credits, and other devices to attain eligibility for players who lacked academic credentials. In an investigation into illegal gambling, the FBI had placed a wiretap on the phone of a major Lobo booster. While Ellenberger was visiting this booster, in November 1979, he took a call on the tapped phone from assistant coach Manny Goldstein. They discussed an arrangement to transfer bogus credits from a California Junior College to the office of the UNM registrar. Based on this conversation, the FBI launched an investigation that led to a federal indictment of Ellenberger on seven counts of fraud and forgery of academic transcripts, though he was acquitted of those charges at trial. In July 1981, however, he was convicted by a state District Court on 21 of 22 counts of fraud and submitting false public vouchers. The judge deferred sentence for a year, noting that it was unfair for Ellenberger alone to bear culpability, and all counts were formally dismissed in 1983.

The NCAA investigation into the scandal found 34 violations of recruiting rules, and the Lobo program was placed on probation and banned from post-season appearances for three years. Six players were dismissed from the team in the opening weeks of the 1979–80 season, and another was suspended. The damage to the program was devastating, as it was forced to rebuild virtually from scratch, beginning in mid-season.

While the criminal charges were cleared from Ellenberger's record, he would never be a college head coach again. Despite the scandal, Ellenberger managed to remain popular in Albuquerque, running a nightclub, appearing in TV commercials, and coaching the city's Continental Basketball Association team – some fans even wanted him to be rehired as Lobo coach. In 1986, former rival and longtime friend Don Haskins hired Ellenberger as his lead assistant at UTEP, where he would coach for four years. He then became the lead assistant for Bobby Knight at Indiana for ten seasons, from 1990 to 2000, and later coached in the NBA and WNBA.

==== Charlie Harrison (1979–1980) ====
When Ellenberger was fired in December 1979, lead assistant Charlie Harrison was elevated to head coach for the remainder of the season. Only four scholarship players remained on the team, so a campus tryout filled out the roster with walk-ons. The team limped to a 6–22 record. One stand-out was Kenny Page, a transfer from Ohio State. Page was the only consistent offensive threat on the team, averaging 28 points a game, still the Lobo record for best season average. Harrison and his players gained fan appreciation for persevering under difficult circumstances, but he served primarily as a caretaker until a new head coach was named.

=== Gary Colson (1980–1988) ===
Gary Colson rebuilt the Lobo program virtually from scratch after Lobogate, restoring its integrity and eventually its success on the court. Colson inherited a program under NCAA sanctions, with only three players remaining on scholarship. While he initially relied on JC transfers to fill the roster, he also began the slow process of rebuilding the program around freshmen recruits, with a greater emphasis on academics. Colson adhered strictly to NCAA rules, as UNM officials watched the program closely, wary of falling back into disfavor with the NCAA. Colson later stated that he felt tremendous pressure to push the rules, and knew other coaches who were doing so and succeeding, but his personal integrity kept him from doing so, an attitude appreciated by his players.

In their first three seasons under Colson, the Lobos struggled to a 39–44 combined record. Four-year starting PG Phil Smith led those early teams, averaging 14 points, six assists, and two steals per game over his career, setting then-records for highest scoring freshman, most steals in a season, and most career assists. A highlight of Colson's first season was his fourth game as head coach, hosting an Arizona State team that would reach #3 in the nation led by future NBA players Byron Scott, Fat Lever, Alton Lister, and Sam Williams. The callow Lobo squad led for much of the game, encouraged by a delirious crowd at The Pit. The Sun Devils battled back to tie the game at the end of regulation before escaping with a win in OT, 86–83. Despite the struggles of the team, attendance at The Pit actually improved in Colson's early years, remaining in the top four nationally.

The 1983–84 Lobos relied almost exclusively on four senior starters, led by Smith and Tim Garrett, to the point that they took over the top four positions in school history for minutes played in a season. The Lobos opened the season with two losses before beating USC and Washington and winning at #7 UCLA. The plucky squad lacked depth, but its veterans found ways to win, building a 16–4 record. The team frequently slowed their games to a crawl, with several league games ending with both teams scoring under 50 points, such as a win at Wyoming, 40–38. The Lobos averaged 63.7 ppg, their lowest output since 1958–59, while holding opponents to 59.2 ppg, the lowest since Bob King's early years. Top ten-ranked UTEP foiled the Lobos, however, sweeping their regular season match-ups and knocking them out of the WAC tournament. Smith was named All-WAC, and Colson was named WAC Coach of the Year. The Lobos returned to the NIT, losing at The Pit to Lamar and finishing the season 24–11. The NIT appearance began a streak of eleven straight years of reaching post-season play.

The Lobos in 1984–85 were led by JC transfer forward Johnny Brown (18.8 points and 6.3 rebounds per game) and senior center George Scott (14 points and 6.6 rebounds), along with a nucleus of sophomores, including guards Hunter Greene and Kelvin Scarborough, who both scored in double figures. The Lobos beat a good Arizona team before losing a close game to #1 Georgetown, led by Patrick Ewing, the first time the Lobos had faced a top-ranked opponent. The team slipped to 6–5 before winning eight out of nine, gaining a share of the WAC lead. They then lost five of six to finish in a tie for third. They beat Texas A&M in the NIT before losing at Fresno State to finish the season 19–13. Brown again led the Lobos in 1985–86 with 20.9 points and 7.5 rebounds a game, earning All-WAC recognition. Scott was lost to graduation, Greene sat out the season injured, and the inexperienced team struggled badly on the road. They nevertheless reached the NIT, losing to Texas and finishing 17–14.

The 1986–87 season was the most successful for Colson as Lobo coach. Greene returned to average 21 points and six rebounds a game, while Scarborough added 19 points and six assists. The Lobos scored over eighty points a game and set the team record for most total points in a season. They also established still-standing records for steals in a season as a team, Greene for steals by a player in a season, and Scarborough for career steals. The Lobos logged wins over Texas and Oklahoma State on the way to a 17–5 record. They then lost three league road games and fell to third in a tight WAC race. The Lobos reached the final of the WAC tournament but lost to Wyoming, which went on to reach the Sweet Sixteen in the NCAA tournament. At 25–9 in a strong WAC, Lobo fans retained hope that New Mexico would gain an at-large berth to the tournament. The selection committee granted the WAC three spots in the field, but the Lobos were left out, a disappointment that would linger through the following season. They were again relegated to the NIT, losing to Oregon State and finishing 25–10, the team record for wins in a season at the time. Scarborough was named All-WAC and finished his career second (now third) in Lobo history in total assists.

In 1987–88 the Lobos were led by Charlie Thomas, a junior transfer from Wake Forest (17 points and 7.5 rebounds a game), and senior Greene (16.8 points, 6.8 rebounds). The team tallied early wins over UCLA, Ohio State, and at Texas before hosting #1 Arizona, led by All-Americans Sean Elliott and Steve Kerr. The Lobos jumped out to a 25–9 lead before the Wildcats chiseled away at the lead, cutting it to two late in the game. Elliott had an opportunity to put Arizona in the lead with a three-pointer with seconds remaining, but Greene blocked the shot to seal the win, the only time the Lobos have beaten a #1-ranked opponent. A week later the Lobos beat #5 Wyoming at The Pit, pushing them to 14–3 and earning a #19 ranking, their first appearance in the polls since Lobogate. They fell into a 6–10 slide, however, including 1–9 on the road, a chronic weakness of the Lobos under Colson, whose teams compiled a 24–65 record in road games. The Lobos again returned to the NIT, beating Pepperdine and Oregon before losing in the quarter-finals to Ohio State, a team they had beaten earlier in the season, finishing with a 22–14 record. Greene completed his career as the only Lobo ever to surpass 1,500 points, 600 rebounds, 300 assists, and 200 steals, averaging 16 points and six rebounds a game as a Lobo.

Colson was forced to resign after the season ended, a move that remains somewhat controversial. Former UNM AD John Bridgers believed Colson had never received the full support of the Lobo community. Colson said the popularity and continued presence of Ellenberger during his early years were unnerving and that he sometimes felt in competition with the former coach. Bridgers had been replaced as AD the year before by John Koenig, who did not believe Colson could take the Lobos to the next level. Colson's teams had gone 107–62 (.633) in his last five seasons, but his failure to win the conference or to make the NCAA tournament were common criticisms. Colson had also clashed with Koenig in a contract dispute and had gone over his head to resolve the issue. Colson's supporters pointed to the strong recruiting class he had coming in, arguing that his best teams were ahead of him, as well as to the integrity and academic success forged by Colson. Complicating matters, Koenig himself was fired three months later and eventually faced indictment on criminal charges for his activities as AD. In the end, fans wanted more than Colson had managed to achieve, and despite the respect he had earned for rebuilding the program, the disappointment of failing to reach the NCAA tournament fueled support for a change.

=== Dave Bliss (1988–1999) ===
Dave Bliss recorded the most wins as head coach in Lobo history, compiling a 246–108 (.695) record, with seven NCAA tournament appearances and three trips to the NIT. The hiring search after Colson's departure included a brief flirtation with Indiana coach Bobby Knight, who visited Albuquerque and was reportedly offered the job. Knight acknowledged that he had seriously considered the offer but eventually declined, stating that he did not have the energy that would be required. Knight recommended Bliss, who had been his assistant at Army and Indiana before serving as head coach at Oklahoma and SMU.

Bliss inherited a strong nucleus of senior Charlie Thomas, junior Darrell McGee, and sophomores Luc Longley and Rob Robbins. All had been Colson recruits, and Bliss reportedly flew to Australia to secure Longley's return to New Mexico. The Lobos got off to a slow start in 1988–89, including losses to #11 Arizona and #6 Oklahoma. They then won 11 of 12, taking the WAC lead into the last month of the season. After a couple of upset losses at home, however, they fell into a tie for second and again settled for the NIT. The Lobos notched wins over Santa Clara and Pepperdine before losing to eventual tournament runner-up St. Louis, finishing the season at 22–11. The Lobos shot their best field goal percentage in a season, .542, placing them second in the nation, and McGee established the still-standing record for assists in a season. Thomas finished his career with over 1,000 points and 500 rebounds, one of two Lobos to accomplish that in just two seasons.

The Lobos had a roller-coaster season in 1989–90, buoyed by record-setting performances by Longley, Robbins, and McGee. They lost four straight early in the year, then won their next five; they lost seven of nine, but won their last seven regular season games; they carried that momentum into the NIT and reached its Final Four. Longley was named All-WAC, averaging 18.4 points and 9.7 rebounds while setting Lobo records for blocks in a season and per game. Robbins led the nation in free throw shooting, making 93.5% of his attempts, including 52 in a row at one point, both school records. McGee capped his career with Lobo records for most games played and most career assists. In the NIT, the Lobos knocked off Oregon, Oklahoma State, and Hawaii to make the Final Four in New York. They lost to St. Louis in the semi-finals, then in overtime to Penn State in the consolation game to finish the season 20–14.

The 1990–91 Lobos were again led by Longley averaging 19.1 points and 9.2 rebounds a game, with Robbins adding 14 points a game. The team began the season 11–2 but lost four straight, struggling on the road. They again finished strong, winning nine of their last eleven, including four of five on the road. They finished third in the WAC but received an at-large bid to the NCAA tournament, their first berth since 1978. They lost in the first round to #14 Oklahoma State to finish 20–10. Longley was again named All-WAC and finished his career as Lobo leader in scoring and rebounding, falling since to sixth in points and second in rebounds. He remains the Lobo career leader in blocks and blocks per game; second in career field goals made; and the only Lobo to record a triple-double, doing so twice. Longley was the seventh player selected in the 1991 NBA draft, by Minnesota, and he went on to win three NBA championships as a starter for the Chicago Bulls (1996–98). Robbins finished his career with the Lobo record for best career free throw percentage, third best three-point shooting percentage, and second most minutes played, having started all 133 games of his career.

The 1991–92 Lobos featured a balanced offense, with all five starters averaging in double figures, but they lacked a go-to scorer. Senior Willie Banks, an Albuquerque High product, led the team along with junior guards Ike Williams and Steve Logan and center Khari Jaxon. The team started slowly, including a home loss to #2 Arizona, but later won seven of eight to gain an early share of the WAC lead. Road struggles slowed them, however, and despite another strong finish they ended up a game out of the lead. Banks was named All-WAC and finished as Lobo career leader (now second) in three-point percentage. The Lobos returned to the NIT, where they beat Louisiana Tech and Washington State before losing at Virginia, finishing the season 20–13.

The 1992–93 Lobos had an experienced core with Williams, Logan, and Jaxon returning as seniors. They began the season 7–1, losing only at #14 Arizona while sweeping ranked New Mexico State. They began their WAC schedule with losses at Utah and BYU but rebounded to win eight of their next nine. The Lobos led the conference in scoring defense and were 15th in the nation, allowing 63.2 points per game. A pair of upset losses prevented them from catching the #9 Utes and #21 Cougars, who were tied atop the league at 14–1 late in the season. The Lobos beat both in The Pit in the final week, however, then upset BYU on the way to winning their first WAC tournament championship, and securing a trip to the NCAA tournament. Williams was named conference tournament MVP; he and Jaxon were both named All-WAC. The Lobos broke into the AP rankings at #21 and received a five-seed in the tournament, facing George Washington in the first round. The team had relied heavily on three-point shooting, hoisting over 100 more attempts than in any previous season, making 39%. Their shooting touch eluded them in the tournament, as several players were suffering from food poisoning before the game. They got into foul trouble and could not stop George Washington's strong inside game, falling in an upset and finishing the season 24–7.

The 1993–94 Lobos were picked in preseason polls to finish fifth in the WAC after losing their three leading players to graduation. Senior Greg Brown, a 5 ft 7in point guard from Albuquerque High, produced a monumental season, though, leading the Lobos to their first regular season WAC title in 16 years. Brown averaged 19.3 points a game, scoring over 30 four times, often in pivotal games, with a season-best 42; junior Marlow White averaged 17, senior Notch Neves 13, and promising freshman Charles Smith added over ten a game. The Lobos again relied on three-point shooting, attempting the most threes in school history while making nearly ten a game, leading the WAC. The Lobos started 11–2, with both losses to New Mexico State in close, exciting games. The team was undefeated at home in conference and won a key road game at BYU to seal the league championship, led by a torrent of points from Brown. They lost in the conference tournament but received a berth in the NCAA tournament as a ten-seed facing Virginia. The Lobos built a 15-point lead early in the second half, but their shooting touch again disappeared, missing their last ten three-pointers. Smith led with 20 points, but the rest of the team shot a combined 29%, including 18% from three-point range. Virginia scored the last eight points of the game to take the lead, and the Lobos missed three shots at tying the game in the last 12 seconds, finishing the season at 23–8. White was named All-WAC and Bliss was WAC Coach of the Year; Brown was named All-WAC and WAC Player of the Year. Brown also won the Frances Pomeroy Naismith Award, given to the nation's top senior under six feet tall and gained an All-American Honorable Mention. Bliss stated, "[a]s a coach, I have never compromised more of my offensive principles than while coaching Greg Brown. Because his best play is to dribble down the court and shoot it. Everybody knows that's not a great basketball play, but for us it was terrific."

The 1994–95 season was a rebuilding year for the Lobos, who finished 15–15 but won six of their last eight games. Sophomore Smith led the team, scoring 16 points a game, while three freshmen – Clayton Shields, David Gibson, and Royce Olney – played extensively. The 1995–96 team added to that nucleus Albuquerque High star Kenny Thomas, a USA Today and Parade magazine High School All-American. The young Lobo squad jumped out to a 10–0 start and a #25 ranking before losing a pair of league road games. Smith averaged 19.5 points a game and Shields added 14.5, while Thomas tallied 14.7 points and 7.8 rebounds a game, setting Lobo standards for freshmen. The Lobos were swept by #7 Utah, dropping to 17–4, but they won their last seven games to finish second in conference. They rode the momentum into the WAC tournament championship game and beat the Utes behind a dominant 30-point, 17-rebound performance by Thomas, earning their tenth straight win and a berth in the NCAA tournament. The Lobos were ranked #23 and received a seven-seed to play Kansas State. The Lobos broke open a close game in the second half with a 26–7 run. Shields led the way with 25 points and 10 rebounds, with Smith adding 15, overcoming a foul-plagued game for Thomas. The Lobos next faced two-seed Georgetown and took a slim lead into the second half. Shields again led with 19 points. With Thomas again slowed by foul trouble, the Lobos were outmatched inside and could not stop All-American Allen Iverson, who scored 20 in the second half. The Lobos finished the season 28–5, their highest season win total and winning percentage to date. Smith and Thomas were named All-WAC, and Bliss was again named WAC Coach of the Year.

The 1996–97 Lobos returned all their principal players, while adding freshman Lamont Long, who would become a starter by mid-season. The team entered the year #18 and would remain ranked throughout the next three seasons. The Lobos started 11–1, losing at Texas Tech but beating #11 Arizona and rising to #11 themselves. The WAC had expanded to 16 teams in the off-season, and eight WAC teams won at least 20 games. The Lobos lost three tough road games but beat #4 Utah in The Pit, pushing them to a #9 ranking – they went 18–0 at home for the season. Smith led in scoring for the third straight season, averaging 17.5 a game, while Shields scored 15.5, and Thomas added 14 points and seven rebounds a game. New Mexico later lost at Utah in a blowout, then lost a close game to the #3 Utes in the WAC tournament. The Lobos were ranked #11 and received a three-seed in the NCAA tournament, their best seed ever. Against Old Dominion in the first round, the Lobos struggled with three-point shooting and turned to their inside game. Thomas had 15 points and eight rebounds, sealing the win with a pair of late free throws, while Long added 14 points and nine boards. They then faced six-seed Louisville in a closely contested game that went down to the final play. The Lobos forced a turnover, down 64–63, but their set play broke down and Gibson missed an unbalanced, driving shot, ending the Lobo season at 25–8. Bliss would identify the loss as a particular disappointment, believing that the Lobos were the better team. Smith led with 16 points and seven rebounds in his final game as a Lobo. He was again named All-WAC and finished as the leading scorer in Lobo history, with 1,993 points, and the leader in field goals made, having started every game of his career. Smith was chosen by the Miami Heat with the 26th pick in the first round of the 1997 NBA draft, playing five seasons in the NBA and several more in Europe.

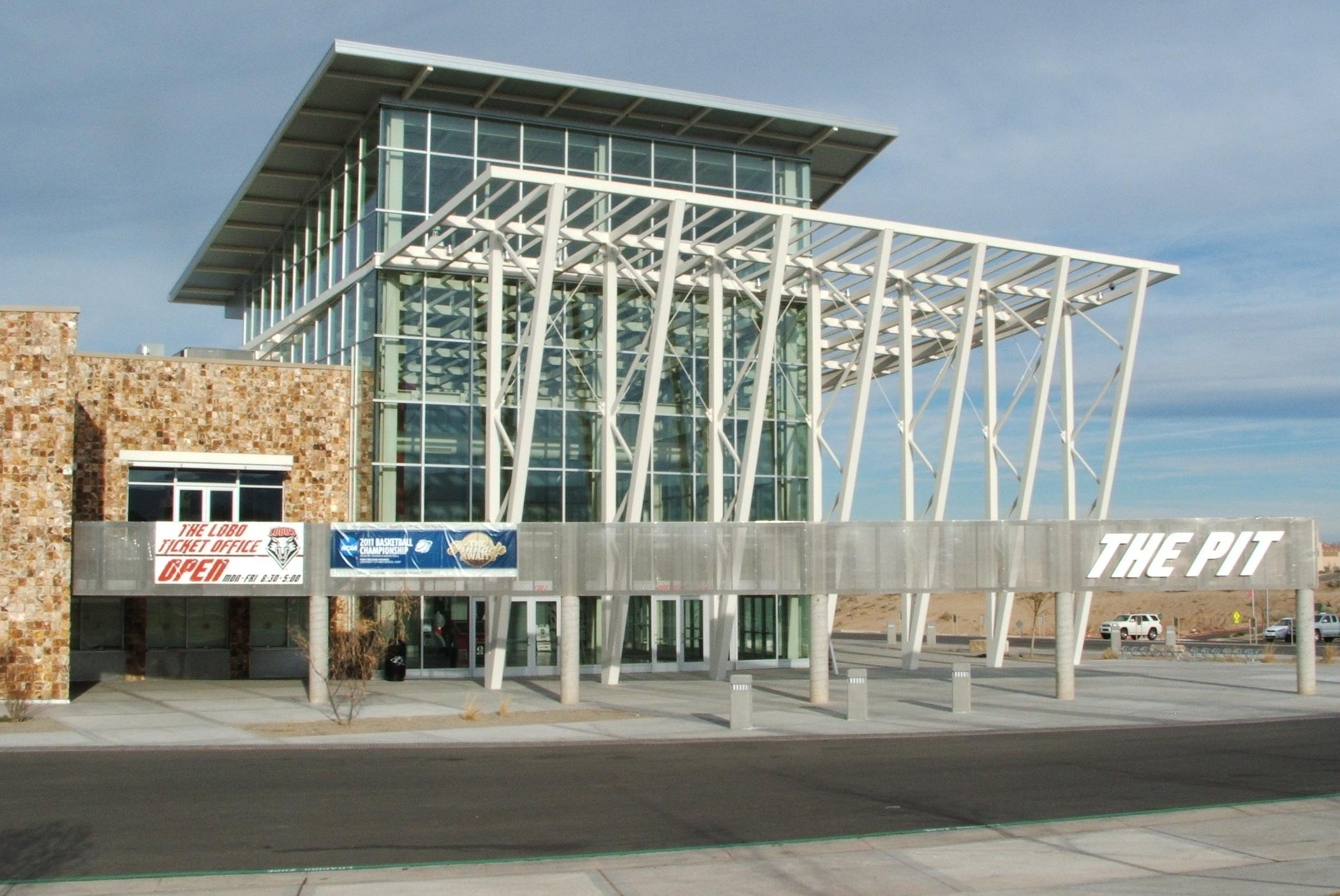
The Pit in 2011, post-renovations

The 1997–98 Lobos had four starters returning and entered the season ranked #11. They began the year 11–1, rising to #8 before losing at #15 UCLA. They later lost at #5 Arizona but beat undefeated, #3 Utah as Olney hit two three-pointers in the final moments, including the game winner at the buzzer. Thomas averaged 17 points and nine rebounds, Shields 17 points and seven rebounds, and Long 14. Olney added 15 a game while shooting a Lobo record .513 from three-point range, as the team set the Lobo record for threes in a season. The Lobos were 21–3 and back at #11 when they lost at #19 TCU, at #5 Utah, and had a team record 41-game home-winning streak ended by BYU. They rebounded to reach the final of the WAC tournament before losing at UNLV but still received a four-seed in the NCAA tournament. Facing Butler in the first round, the Lobos were already without an injured Olney when Gibson suffered a concussion and broken finger; Thomas again spent the game in foul trouble. Unfazed, Long scored 22, Shields had 17, and bench reserves added 33 points as the Lobos won handily. Against five-seed Syracuse, however, the depleted Lobos shot under 26% and lost to finish the season 24–8. Thomas was named second-team All-American, and he and Shields were both All-WAC. Shields finished his career as the third (now fourth) leading scorer in Lobo history and as career leader in three-pointers. Gibson finished as Lobo career leader in minutes played. Attendance at The Pit remained in the top ten nationally during the Bliss years, finishing sixth in the nation twice and reaching its highest season average ever in 1997–98 at 17,625 per game.

The 1998–99 Lobos again started strong with a 12–1 record, reaching #11; they stood at 16–2 after beating #7 Arizona but then lost four of five, struggling on the road. Thomas averaged 18 points and 10 rebounds, Long 17 points and 6.5 boards. The team won seven of their last nine, both losses coming to #8 Utah, in Salt Lake and in the WAC tournament final. The Lobos advanced to the NCAA tournament for the fourth straight season, garnering a nine-seed against Missouri. Thomas had his best NCAA performance with 20 points, 10 rebounds, and four blocks, while Long added 17 points and 12 rebounds and made the game-winning basket in the closing seconds. The Lobos then fell to eventual national champion Connecticut, shooting just 26%, to finish 25–9. Thomas was named All-WAC for the third time and finished his career as the second leading scorer and top rebounder in Lobo history. He was selected as the 22nd pick in the first round of the 1999 NBA draft by Houston and played for 11 seasons in the NBA.

The four seasons with Kenny Thomas in the line-up was the best stretch by the Lobos to date. They compiled a 102–30 (.772) record while making the NCAA tournament and winning in the first round all four years. Bliss had won 246 games as Lobo head coach and reached the NCAA tournament seven times, both school records. His teams won twenty or more games and reached post-season tournaments in ten of his 11 seasons, and he coached the four leading scorers in Lobo history. Yet, despite his success, Bliss faced mounting criticism from fans and the media for poor academic performance by his players, lax discipline, lightweight schedules, and the failure to advance to the Sweet 16 of the NCAA tournament. Deciding it was time to move on, Bliss resigned and accepted the head coach position at Baylor, reportedly more than doubling his UNM salary. In 2003, he was forced to resign from Baylor embroiled in an ugly scandal that would end his college coaching career.

=== Fran Fraschilla (1999–2002) ===
Fran Fraschilla coached at New Mexico for three seasons, compiling a 55–41 (.572) record with three NIT appearances. Fraschilla was hired days after Bliss resigned, touted as a great recruiter and up-and-coming coach after leading Manhattan and St. John's to the NCAA tournament. He had left St. John's under murky circumstances, however, and worked as a broadcaster and scout during the preceding season.

Before the 1999–2000 season, the Lobos and seven other teams left the WAC to form the Mountain West Conference (MWC). Fraschilla inherited three returning starters, but the team was clearly heading into a rebuilding period after losing Thomas. The inconsistent squad started 5–5 but then stunned 21-point favorite, #2 Arizona in Tucson, the highest ranked opponent the Lobos had beaten on the road since 1966. The team meandered to a 13–11 record but then won four straight, including over #21 Utah. They went to the NIT and beat South Florida before losing at eventual champion Wake Forest, finishing 18–14. Lamont Long averaged 18.7 points a game to lead the league and earn All-MWC honors, finishing his career as the third leading scorer in Lobo history, three points ahead of former teammate Shields.

The Lobos added transfer Ruben Douglas from Arizona before the 2000–01 season, but other key recruits were sidelined by injury and disciplinary problems. Several players left the team, some claiming abuse by Fraschilla. The Lobos started the season 12–2, with an overtime win at Sweet 16-bound Gonzaga, but a blowout loss at #1 Stanford began a 1–6 slump, including several poor road performances. Douglas was an explosive scorer and led the team with 16 points a game. The Lobos heated up in the MWC tournament, reaching the final but losing on a missed shot at the end of the game. They went to the NIT and beat Bliss-led Baylor and Pepperdine in The Pit before losing at Memphis to finish 21–13.

Fraschilla felt he had his system and recruits in place going into the 2001–02 season, and Lobo fans were eager for the team to return to the NCAA tournament. The Lobos lost to #13 Stanford in their opener but moved to 10–3 as Douglas led the way with 18 points a game. Hosting #18 Gonzaga, Douglas missed a pair of free throws to send the game into overtime, and the Lobos lost; point guard Marlon Parmer ripped teammates in the locker room, beginning a string of problems on court and off. The team went on a 4–10 slide starting with a blowout loss at home to Utah, after which Parmer was dismissed, and culminating with forward Patrick Dennehy shoving teammates and walking off the court during a loss at Air Force. Fraschilla had lost the team: nine players had left the program or been dismissed during his tenure. The team finished 16–14 after another blowout loss at Minnesota in the NIT. Fraschilla resigned shortly after the season, concluding that "it was best for everyone that I leave."

=== Ritchie McKay (2002–2007) ===
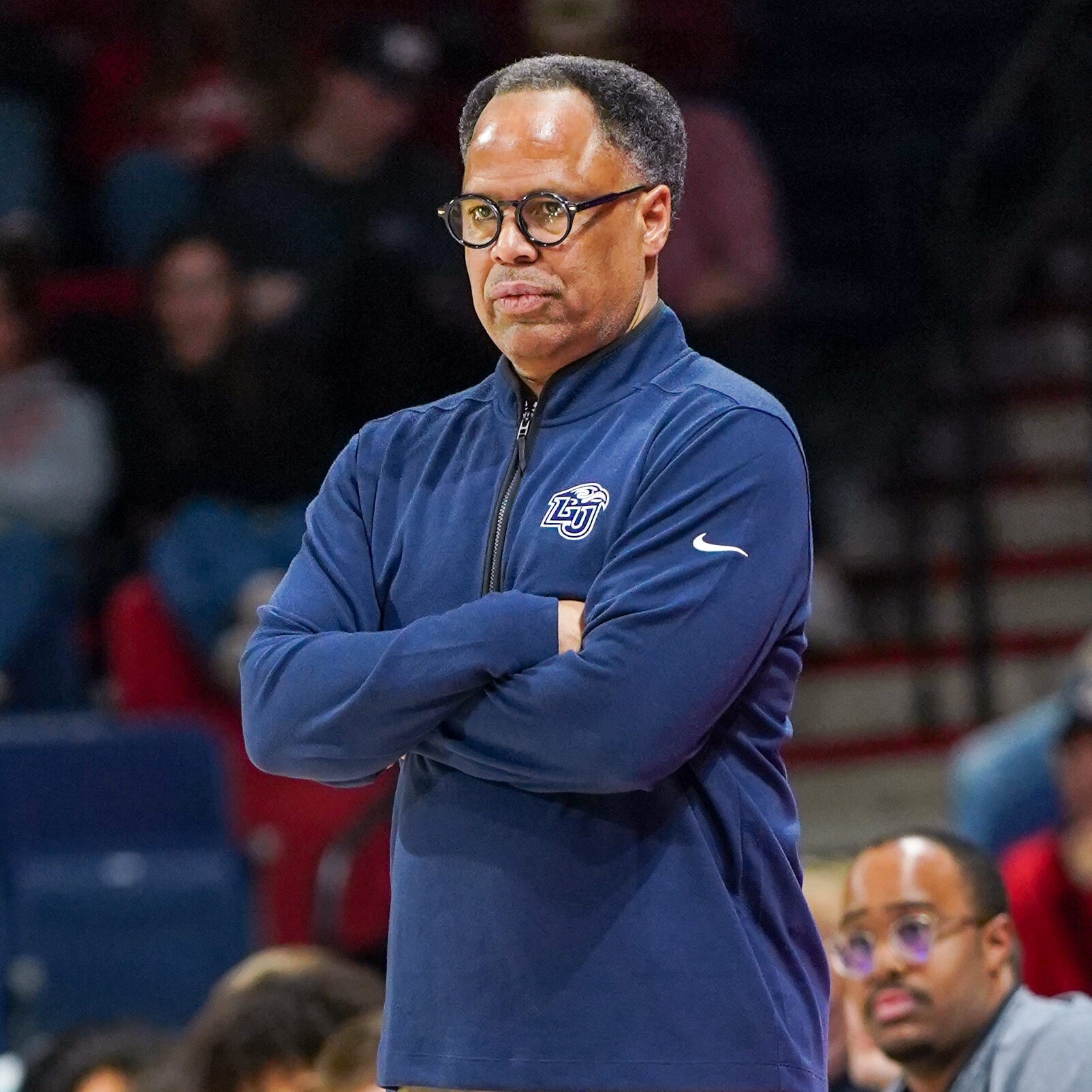
Ritchie McKay

Ritchie McKay was head coach at New Mexico for five seasons with a record of 82–69 (.543) and one NCAA tournament appearance. After several coaches were discussed as candidates, some turning down offers, McKay was hired in a late night surprise and was not a popular choice among Lobo fans. His father played at UNM for Bob King, but McKay had only coached for brief stints at Portland State, Colorado State, and Oregon State, with an 83–89 career record.

McKay faced a major rebuilding project in 2002–03 compounded by further dismissals and injuries that cut the team to seven scholarship players. They languished to a 10–18 finish, the first losing season for the Lobos in twenty years. Senior Ruben Douglas was the lone offensive threat and became the only Lobo ever to lead the nation in scoring, averaging 28 points a game. He was named MWC Player of the Year and finished his career as the fifth leading scorer in Lobo history. A grim year for the program began with a severe spinal cord injury to guard Senque Carey, who would recover fully but never play again. Discipline trouble and player defections continued into the off-season. Misfortune turned to tragedy with the murder of former Lobo Patrick Dennehy – leading to a scandal at Baylor implicating Dave Bliss – and the suicide of Lobo transfer Billy Feeney. Both had close friends and long-time teammates still on the Lobo roster.

Bradley transfer Danny Granger became eligible during the 2003–04 season and led the team with 19.5 points a game. The young squad showed promising signs early but struggled in conference to finish 14–14. All returned for 2004–05, and Granger turned in a spectacular season, averaging 19 points and nine rebounds a game to gain All-American recognition. All five starters averaged in double figures, but the team had little depth and relied heavily on Granger. The Lobos were 10–1 when they lost to #5 Wake Forest, and 14–2 when Granger suffered an injury and missed three games, all losses. They won 12 of 13 after Granger returned, however, winning the MWC tournament final over #15 Utah and receiving a 12-seed in the NCAA tournament. Facing #22 Villanova, the Lobos shot 18% in the first half, scoring just eleven points and trailing by as much as 24. They battled to within five points in the second half but could not overcome their poor start. Granger was selected by the Indiana Pacers with the 17th pick in the first round of the 2005 NBA draft and has placed among league leaders in scoring and been named an All-Star during his career.

McKay continued to attract strong transfer players, but discipline issues persisted in 2005–06. Versatile senior guard Mark Walters led the team with 16 points a game, but after winning four straight to build a 16–9 record, they lost four of five to finish 17–13 and did not receive a post-season bid. Road struggles kept the team from gaining momentum, a chronic problem as the Lobos went 8–43 in away games under McKay. The 2006–07 team featured talented Kansas transfer J. R. Giddens, who led the team with 16 points a game, but discipline problems limited his playing time. The team began 9–2 with an upset over #8 Wichita State but wilted in league play, going 4–12 and finishing 15–17. Fan criticism had reached a crescendo and attendance at The Pit had been dropping significantly. First-year Athletic Director Paul Krebs announced before the end of the season that McKay would not return for the following season.

=== Steve Alford (2007–2013) ===
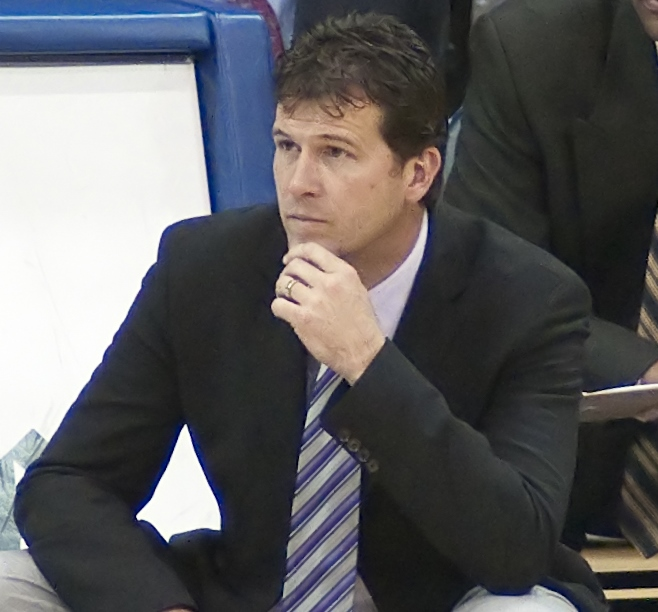
Steve Alford

Steve Alford coached the Lobos for six seasons, compiling a 155–52 (.749) record with three NCAA tournament appearances, at least a share of four league titles, and two conference tournament championships. As a player Alford had been a prolific scorer and two-time All-American at Indiana, winning a national championship, and earning an Olympic gold medal with the U.S. national team. He had been a collegiate coach for 16 seasons, the previous eight at Iowa, amassing over 300 career wins.

An early objective for Alford was to change the culture of the program regarding discipline and academic focus. Under McKay, J.R. Giddens had frequently missed games due to disciplinary problems. Alford applied a strict regimen and Giddens responded with a standout senior season, leading the team with 16 points and nine rebounds a game. Six other players averaged between seven and ten points as balanced scoring became a hallmark of Lobo squads under Alford. The Lobos began the 2007–08 season 14–2 before losing four of six in league; they then won eight of nine to close out the regular season. They lost in the conference tournament but received a bid to the NIT, losing at Cal to finish 24–9, the most wins for a first-year Lobo coach to date. Giddens was named MWC Co-Player of the Year and received an AP All-American Honorable Mention. He was selected as the 30th pick in the first round of the 2008 NBA draft by Boston.

The 2008–09 Lobos mixed four veterans with young Alford recruits and were picked in the preseason to finish fifth in the MWC. Senior Tony Danridge led the unit with 15 points a game, though they again relied on balance and teamwork. The Lobos struggled to a 9–7 start before pulling together in league play, going 12–4 after winning their final five games to gain a share of the MWC title. They lost in the first round of the conference tournament, however, and were again relegated to the NIT, where they beat Nebraska but lost at Notre Dame, finishing the season 22–12. Danridge was named All-MWC, and Alford was tabbed MWC Coach of the Year.

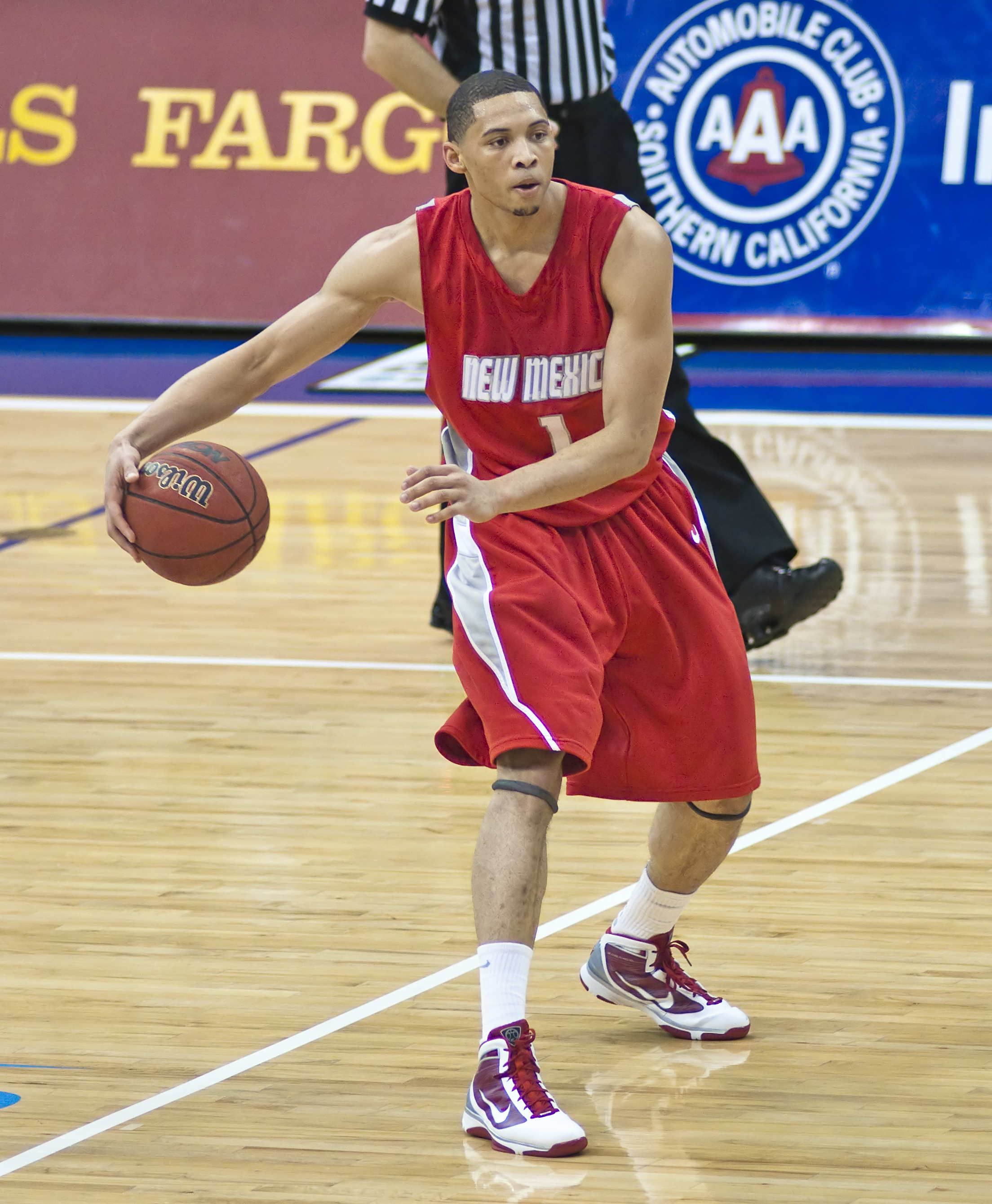
Darington Hobson

The 2009–10 Lobos were again a young squad picked to finish fifth in the MWC in preseason polls. Versatile JC transfer Darington Hobson joined lone senior Roman Martinez, junior Dairese Gary, and eight sophomores and freshmen. The Lobos jumped out to a 12–0 start with wins over #25 Cal and #16 Texas A&M, vaulting to #12 in the national rankings. After losing at Oral Roberts, they beat #20 Texas Tech and a Dayton squad that would go on to win the NIT. Hobson led the team with 16 points, nine rebounds, and 4.6 assists a game, the only Lobo to ever lead in all three. Martinez added 14 points and six rebounds a game, and Gary 13 points and four assists. The Lobos dropped their first two MWC games but then reeled off 15 straight wins – their second longest winning streak ever – sweeping #10 BYU. The Lobos rose to #8 in the polls and won the MWC title. They lost in the conference tournament but received a three-seed in the NCAA tournament. The team had relied heavily on its starters and was worn down with fatigue and injuries. They struggled to win against first round opponent Montana, and Hobson injured his wrist and back. In the second round the hobbled Lobos could not keep up with athletic, fast-breaking Washington. They finished 30–5, the most wins in a Lobo season, while going 10–2 in road games and 6–0 against ranked teams, also team highs. Alford was again named MWC Coach of the Year, and Gary was All-MWC. Hobson was named as MWC Player of the Year and a third-team All-American. He declared for the 2010 NBA draft and was selected in the second round by Milwaukee. Martinez was honored as an Academic All-American and received the NCAA Chip Hilton Player of the Year Award for outstanding character, leadership, integrity, and talent.

The early departure of Hobson left the Lobos with just one senior again in 2010–11: Gary led with 14 points and 5.5 assists a game, carrying the young team at times. He was joined by UCLA transfer Drew Gordon, who averaged 13 points and 10.5 rebounds, and the program's most successful freshman class to date, including starter Kendall Williams who scored 12 points a game. The Lobos began the season 10–1, but youth caught up to them in league play and they went .500 the rest of the way. They beat #3 BYU in Provo to sweep the regular season series but lost to the Cougars in the conference tournament. Gary injured his knee in the game, a sad career end for a four-year starter and steady leader. The Lobos went to the NIT and beat UTEP before losing at Alabama, finishing 22–13.

Gordon became a dominating inside presence in 2011–12, averaging 14 points and 11 rebounds, registering 19 double-doubles, and setting the Lobo season record for rebounds. Williams and fellow sophomore Tony Snell scored in double figures. The team played exceptional defense, allowing under 60 points per game, its fewest in the shot clock era, placing among national leaders in several categories. After two early losses, the Lobos won 13 straight en route to a 15–2 mark. They dropped a pair of league games but then won seven straight, winning at #13 San Diego State and trouncing #11 UNLV to take the league lead and climb into the national rankings at #18. Two road losses made them settle for a share of the regular season MWC title, but they again beat ranked SDSU and UNLV to secure the conference tournament championship, the first time they won both titles in a season. Gordon was named All-MWC and conference tourney MVP. The #21 Lobos received a five-seed in the NCAA tournament facing Long Beach State. Gordon had 18 points and 13 rebounds, while Williams added 16 with two late baskets to seal the win. Against four-seed Louisville, the Lobos took an early lead, fell behind by 15, then battled back to within two late in the game. Gordon had 21 points and 14 rebounds, but the team shot poorly from three-point range and could not overcome the deficit, finishing the season 28–7.

The 2012–13 Lobo squad was dominated by juniors and sophomores, though all were veteran contributors, including three returning starters. The team was again defense-oriented, surrendering just 60 points a game and grinding out close wins, frequently coming from behind. Williams, Snell, and center Alex Kirk led a balanced attack with seven players leading the team in scoring in individual games. The Lobos climbed to #16 with a 12–0 start, with a win over #19 Connecticut, before losing to NCAA tournament-bound South Dakota State; they won at #8 Cincinnati then lost at St Louis, which later reached #13. The Lobos' strength of schedule powered them to a #2 RPI ranking, and they won a program-record 15 games away from The Pit. The MWC enjoyed its best season to date with four teams achieving national rankings and five making the NCAA tournament. The Lobos lost on the road to ranked San Diego State and UNLV but beat both at home and won nine out of ten to clinch the league title. Williams hit a school-record 10 threes and scored 46 points at Colorado State, both MWC records. Snell paced the offense down the stretch, averaging 18 points a game and leading the Lobos to the MWC tournament championship. The Lobos were ranked #10 and received a three-seed in the NCAA tournament, facing Harvard, but they again turned in a disappointing performance. Kirk led with 22 points and 12 rebounds, but the team shot poorly and trailed most of the game as the Crimson answered Lobo runs with timely three-pointers to seal the upset. The Lobos finished the season 29–6, their second-best record ever. Williams was named MWC Player of the Year, and Alford was named Coach of the Year.

The day before the NCAA tournament began, UNM announced a 10-year contract extension with Alford; 10 days later, he resigned to take the head coaching position at UCLA. In the interim, Snell announced he was declaring for the NBA draft. The tournament upset and departures were disheartening blows for Lobo fans. Alford had led the program back to national prominence, attaining its best six-year stretch ever while improving academic achievement. The Lobo players and fan base rallied around long-time associate head coach Craig Neal, hoping to maintain continuity, and he was hired to replace Alford. Snell was selected by Chicago with the 20th pick in the first round of the NBA draft.

=== Craig Neal (2013–2017) ===
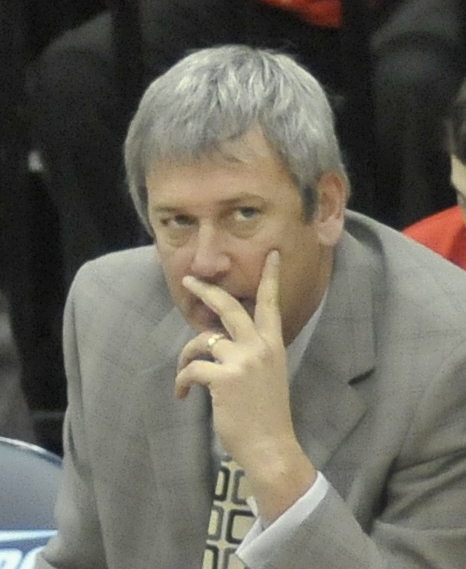
Craig Neal

Craig Neal was associate head coach under Alford for three seasons at Iowa and six seasons at UNM before taking the Lobo helm. Neal played for Bobby Cremins at Georgia Tech, earning All-ACC honors as he set the conference record for assists in a season. He played professionally for eight seasons then coached in the NBA for eight more before joining Alford at Iowa.

Neal inherited four returning starters for the 2013–14 season, joining seven newcomers. Senior Cameron Bairstow had a breakout season, averaging 20 points and seven rebounds a game, achieving one of the best single-season improvements in school history. Williams averaged 16 points and five assists, and Kirk added 13 points and nine rebounds. The Lobos began the season 7–1, beating Cincinnati, which later reached #7, but losing to Massachusetts, later #13; they lost to Kansas, which peaked at #2, but beat Marquette. The team struggled at times as the bench developed, suffering a pair of home upsets to leave them 12–4. They then won 12 of 13, including a win over #6 San Diego State to knot the MWC race, but they lost the title showdown at SDSU after squandering a large lead. The teams met again in the conference tournament final, and the Lobos prevailed for their third straight MWC tournament championship. They received a seven-seed in the NCAA tournament, facing Stanford. Following a familiar pattern, the Lobos fell behind early then battled back. Bairstow led with 24 points and eight rebounds, but the team shot poorly and their comeback fell short. The Lobos finished the season 27–7, Neal tallying the most wins ever for a first-year Lobo coach. Bairstow and Williams were named first team All-MWC; Kirk was third team. Bairstow was named second-team All-American by Sports Illustrated. Williams finished his career as the fifth leading scorer in Lobo history, third in assists, and the MWC career assists leader.

On April 1, 2017, Neal was dismissed as head coach after compiling a record of 76–52 (.594).

=== Paul Weir (2017–2021) ===
On April 11, 2017, Paul Weir was named head coach of the Lobos. Before the 2017–2018 season started, 10 of the 15 players from the previous season either transferred, left the team, or graduated. In his first season, Weir posted a 19–15 record and finished in 3rd place in the Mountain West. They lost in the 2018 Mountain West Championship to San Diego State 82–75.

In the 2018–2019 season, Weir was reliant on four transfers from both Division 1 programs or junior college transfers, as well as returning senior Anthony Mathis. UNM finished the season 14-18 and in 7th place in the Mountain West. The highlight of the season was a 85–58 win over No. 6 Nevada in The Pit. UNM lost in the Mountain West Championship quarterfinals to Utah State.

The 2019-2020 season started well for the Lobos, as transfers JaQuan Lyle, J.J. Caldwell, Carlton Bragg Jr., and Vance Jackson led UNM to a 15–3 start. The Lobos then slumped to 3–11 to finish out the season. Bragg Jr. was accused of sexual assault and later arrested for DWI in January 2020 and was dismissed from the team. Caldwell was also kicked off the team in January because of a domestic violence accusation. Also in January, Lyle hosted a party at an Airbnb location where two people were shot, one of which was a UNM female athlete. It was later revealed that UNM basketball players were also at the party after a 22-point loss to Nevada, after they had taken a charter flight that night. Lyle had not traveled to Nevada because of a knee injury. UNM would go on to lose in the quarterfinals to Utah State in the Mountain West Championship.

The Lobos played the 2020–21 season entirely outside of New Mexico due to health protocols in response to the COVID-19 pandemic which prevented the team from practicing or playing games in state. They finished the season with an 6–16 record, and Weir was fired. The Lobos went 58-63 in his four seasons and failed to reach the postseason.

=== Richard Pitino (2021–2025) ===
On March 16, 2021, Richard Pitino was named the 22nd head coach of the Lobos. Pitino inherited 6 transfers, including three former Power-5 league players in Jaelen House, Jamal Mashburn Jr., and Gethro Muscadin. The Lobos started out 8–6 in the non-conference, including a win against in-state rival New Mexico State where the game was delayed due to a power outage at Pan American Center. In Mountain West play, however, the Lobos went 5–12. The highlight of the season was a 75–66 win over No. 22 Wyoming. They went on to lose in the first round in the Mountain West Championship against Nevada.

The Lobos started the 2022–23 season with a 14–0 record, with significant wins over Saint Mary's and Iona. After a mid-season slump, they finished with a 22–12 overall record and 8–10 in conference, earning a berth in the National Invitation Tournament (NIT). The Lobos were led by first-team All-Mountain West guards Jamal Mashburn Jr., the leading scorer in the conference, and Jaelen House, who was third in the nation in steals, along with conference newcomer of the year Morris Udeze, the conference leader in double-doubles. Pitino's contract was extended through the 2027–28 season, reflecting the program's progress under Pitino's leadership.

In 2023–24, the Lobos tallied a 26–10 record, won the Mountain West conference tournament, and returned to the NCAA tournament after a ten-year absence. They finished 22nd in the NET rankings and returned to the Top 25 in average home attendance with a Mountain West-best 13,042 per game. Jaelen House led the Lobos with 15.9 points per game and was named Mountain West Defensive Player of the Year. Jamal Mashburn Jr. and Donovan Dent each averaged 14 points per game, and JT Toppin with 12 points and 9 rebounds a game was named Mountain West Freshman of the Year. The Lobos were the first team in Mountain West history to win the conference tournament with four wins in four days. They gained an 11-seed to the NCAA tournament, where they lost to Clemson in the first round.

In 2024–25, Pitino led the Lobos to a 27–8 record and their first regular-season conference title since 2012–13. Donovan Dent was named Mountain West Player of the Year, the only player in the country, and first in league history, to average over 20 points and 6 assists a game. Nelly Junior Joseph joined Dent on the All-Mountain West first team and was also named to the league All-Defense team, and Pitino was voted Mountain West Coach of the Year. The Lobos gained a 10-seed in the NCAA tournament and beat 7-seed Marquette in the first round, making Pitino and his father, Rick Pitino, the first father-son duo to win NCAA tournament games in the same year. The Lobos then lost in the second round to 2-seed Michigan State.

On March 25, 2025, Pitino accepted the head coaching position at Xavier University. In four seasons at New Mexico, Pitino compiled an 88–49 record, with two conference titles and back-to-back NCAA tournament appearances.

=== Eric Olen (2025–present) ===
On March 30, 2025, Eric Olen was named head coach of the Lobos. Olen was head coach at UC San Diego for 12 seasons, the school’s all-time winningest coach, and led the program through the transition from Division II to Division I. The team reached the NCAA Tournament in 2025, the first season the school was eligible, compiling a 30-5 record.

In his first season at New Mexico, Olen built a team of transfers and freshmen, as every player from the previous season either transferred or ran out of eligibility. Yet the team started strong, with a 9-2 pre-conference record, including wins over Santa Clara and at VCU. They finished third in the Mountain West at 13-7, ranking in the top 50 in the NET and KenPom ratings. The Lobos featured three freshman averaging double-digit scoring, a program first. Shooting guard Jake Hall led the team with 16.4 points per game and set the Lobo single-season record with 117 three-pointers. Hall was named to the All-Mountain West team and voted conference Freshman of the Year. Tomilslav Buljan earned Second Team All-Mountain West honors after he led the conference in rebounding (10.3 per game) and double-doubles (17). The Lobos received a top seed and home regional in the 2026 NIT, where they reeled off victories over Sam Houston, George Washington, and Saint Joseph's to reach the NIT Final Four in Indianapolis. They lost in the semi-finals to Tulsa, finishing the season at 26-11. Following the season, Olen was rewarded with a new five-year contract.

== The Pit ==
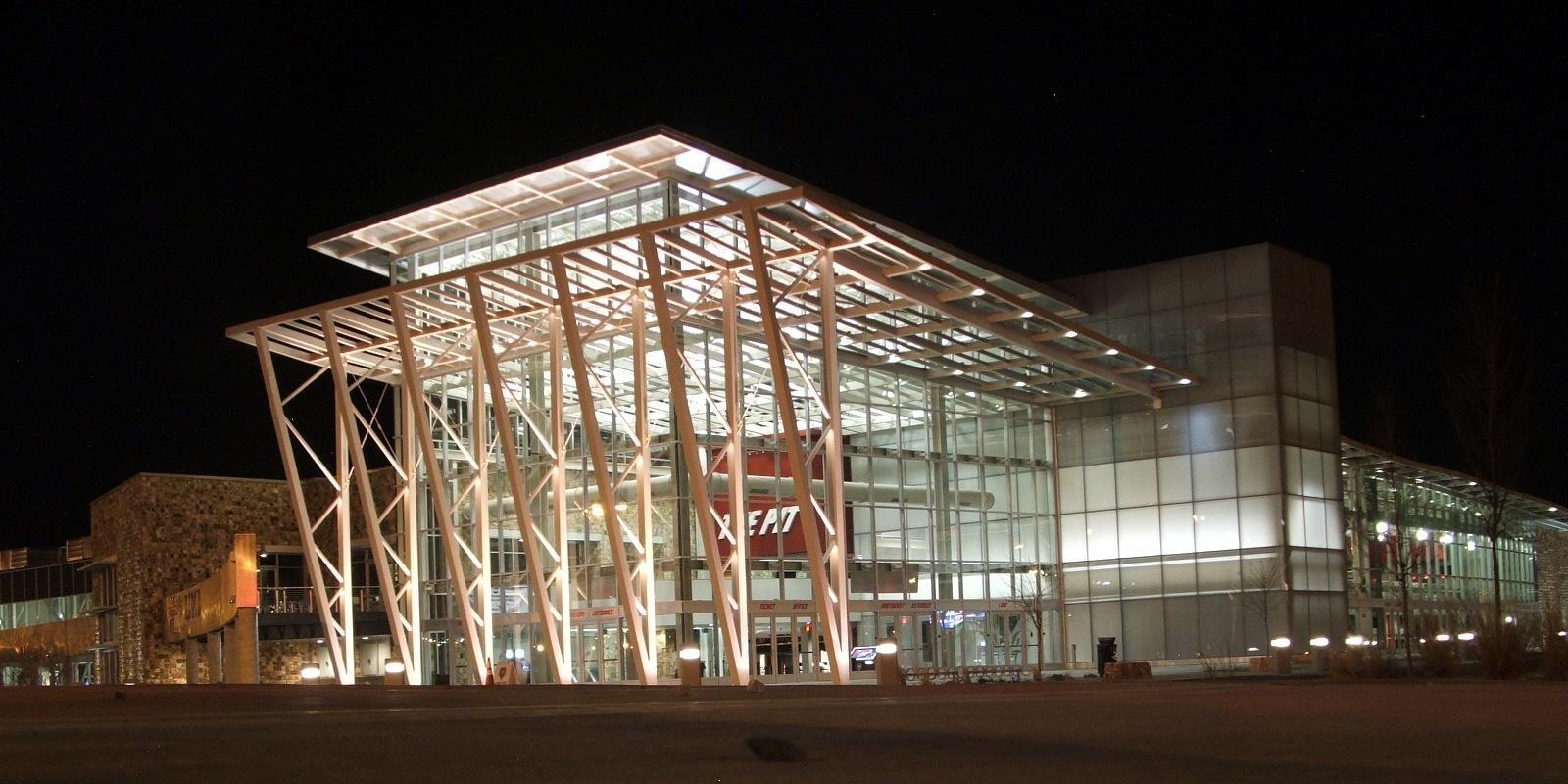
The Pit

Early New Mexico basketball teams played in what became known as the Old Wooden Gym, where the walls were the out-of-bounds markers. In 1928 Coach Roy Johnson organized construction of Carlisle Gymnasium, seating about 1,500 spectators with later additions doubling that figure, and in 1957 Johnson Gymnasium opened, with a capacity of 7,800. The success of the Lobos under Bob King led to rapidly growing fan interest. Attendance doubled, Johnson Gym was soon selling out, and plans for a larger arena began to be developed.

University Arena opened in 1966 but was soon nicknamed "The Pit" due to its innovative subterranean design, with the playing floor 37 feet below street level. The Lobos have enjoyed exceptional success at The Pit, winning over 80 percent of their games and mounting home-winning streaks of over 20 games four times, with the longest of 41 straight in 1996–98. The Lobos have made 14 NCAA tournament appearances and 17 NIT appearances since the opening of the arena. In 1992 the basketball court at The Pit was named "Bob King Court" in honor of the coach who made its construction possible.

Attendance at Lobo games in The Pit has consistently been among the national leaders in college basketball, averaging over 15,400 fans per game since it opened. The Lobos finished in the top five nationally in attendance 16 times in their first 20 years at The Pit, reaching second five times, and they were in the top ten all but one season through 2002. The design of the arena makes it one of the loudest venues in college basketball, creating a hostile playing environment for visitors. A study of decibel levels at collegiate basketball arenas found that a game at The Pit registered as the loudest at 118 decibels, comparable to a turbo-fan aircraft at takeoff power. Noise levels up to 125 decibels have been measured, close to the pain threshold for the human ear. Contributing to the intimidating environment for visitors is the mile high elevation of The Pit, emphasized to visiting teams with a message along the wall of the tunnel from the locker rooms down to the playing floor saying, "Welcome to the legendary Pit, a mile high and louder than..."

The Pit has garnered praise as one of the top venues in college basketball from sports reporters, announcers, and opposing coaches. Sports Illustrated listed The Pit among its Top 20 Sporting Venues of the 20th Century. Jim Boeheim, Lute Olson, and Steve Fisher have praised Lobo fans and the exciting atmosphere coaching at The Pit. Rick Majerus, who compiled a 5–11 record against the Lobos at The Pit, tying him with Don Haskins for most wins by a visiting coach, noted the intensity and dedication of Lobo fans and their knowledge of the game, The Pit hosted the 1983 NCAA Final Four, the last time the event was held on a college campus. North Carolina State upset heavily favored Houston in the memorable championship, sealing the victory with a last second basket. The video clip of NC State coach Jim Valvano celebrating at the end of the game documents one of the most famous moments in NCAA basketball history and is a staple of NCAA tournament television coverage.

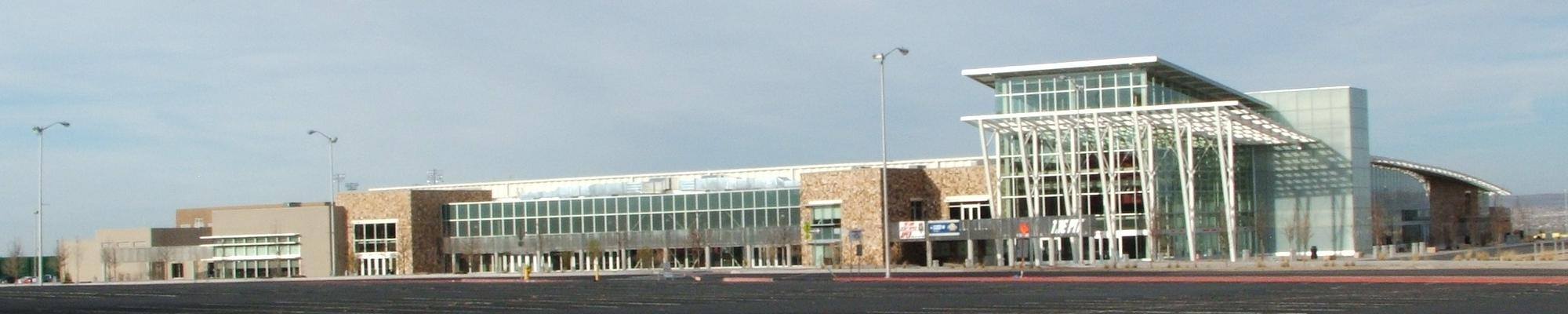
The Pit after 2009–10 renovation

Renovations completed in 2010 added space and state-of-the-art amenities for fans and players. Luxury suites and club seats were added, along with digital video boards, expanded concourses, additional restrooms and concession stands, and upgraded training facilities, while preserving the historic character of the building. The upgrade reduced seating capacity to 15,411, trading some seating for greater comfort and amenities. The building facade was also transformed, adding extensive glasswork and a steel superstructure.

=== Naming rights ===
In December 2014, Albuquerque-based restaurant chain WisePies Pizza & Salad purchased the naming rights for the arena, whose official name became "WisePies Arena (aka The Pit)". On April 27, 2017, UNM asked WisePies to relinquish the naming rights, per the terms of the agreement, and WisePies agreed to do so.

On May 3, 2017, UNM announced a $10 million naming rights agreement with Dreamstyle Remodeling, an Albuquerque-based construction business, covering both The Pit and the UNM football stadium. The official name of the facilities became Dreamstyle Arena and Dreamstyle Stadium.

On September 18, 2020, it was announced that the naming rights deal with Dreamstyle Remodeling was ending after only three years.

=== Traditions ===
The official mascot of the University of New Mexico is the "Lobo", the Spanish word for "wolf", adopted by the school in 1920. Human mascots, dubbed "Lobo Louie and Lobo Lucy", members of the cheerleading squad, roam The Pit during games rousing and entertaining fans. During the 1980s, a popular chant among Lobo fans was "Everyone's a Lobo, Woof Woof Woof!", coupled with a hand gesture emulating a wolf. It was phased out during the '90s but has since become the signature cheer for Lobo fans.

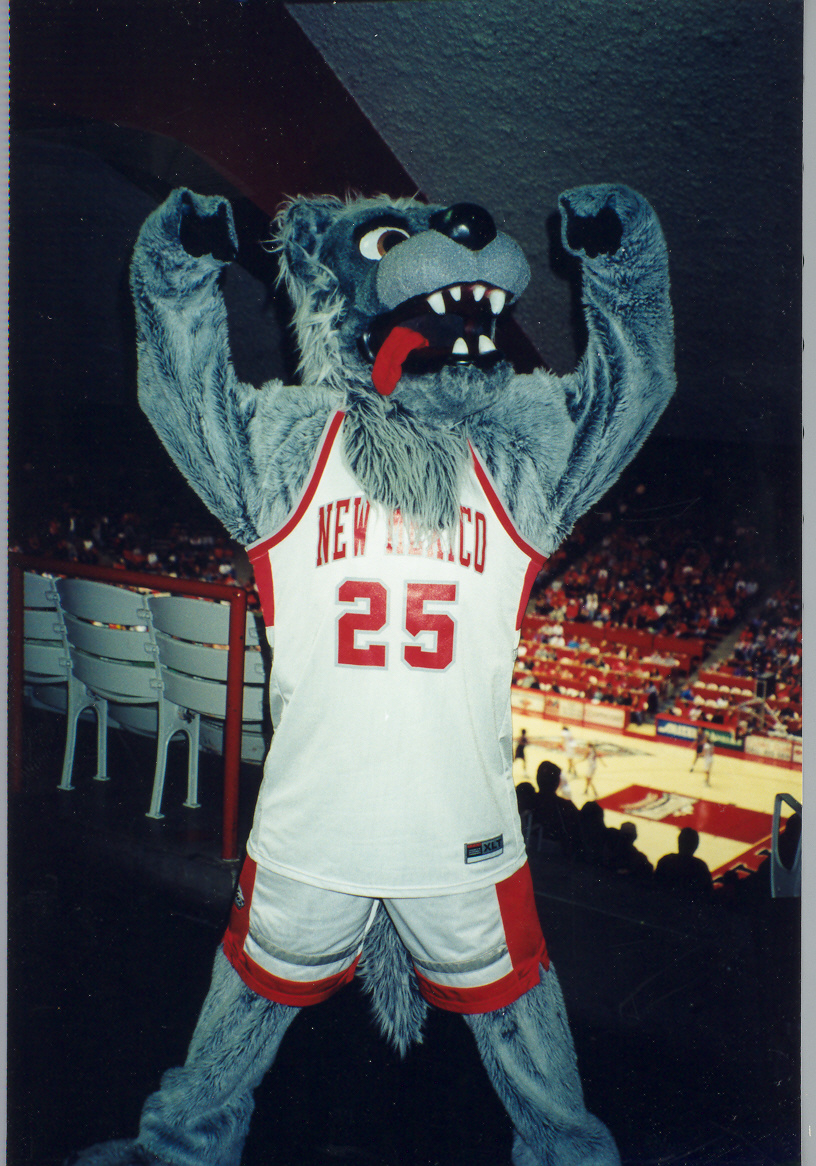
Lobo Louie at the Pit

At the start of each half during Lobo games at The Pit, fans continue to stand and clap their hands until both teams score a basket, adding pressure on teams that struggle to score for long stretches. The student section in The Pit, Section 26, is particularly noteworthy for the antics of its raucous fans, taunting and intimidating opposing players, often with personal remarks, and offering enticing visuals for television broadcasters: They chant, jump up and down in unison, shake newspapers and signs to make noise and create distractions, and some dress in costumes and body paint. The noise level of the boisterous fans, the intimacy created by seating extending to the edge of the court, and the elevation contribute to what Coach Dave Bliss termed "a Pit game."

The Lobo Howl is an event held initially on midnight of the first day the NCAA allows teams to practice. Over the years it has evolved into a family-like atmosphere held during the evening, including player introductions, practice drills and scrimmages, three-point shooting and slam dunk contests, and other festivities. Student-athletes from both men's and women's squads participate and sign autographs for fans, and the event is used to attract recruits invited to attend. The 2013 Howl drew over 10,000 fans and featured the introduction of new coach Craig Neal, who entered the arena on his motorcycle.

Sportscaster Mike Roberts was the "Voice of the Lobos" on KKOB radio in Albuquerque from 1966 to 2008, becoming an icon among Lobo fans. He was an integral part of the Lobo fan experience, especially before most games were televised. Roberts noted the noise level in The Pit as a challenge for a broadcaster: "There were a lot of times when I knew I was calling the game because my lips were moving, but I couldn't hear a thing I said." Many fans were disappointed and outraged when Roberts was dismissed by KKOB in 2008. New Mexico Governor Bill Richardson declared May 8, 2008 as "Mike Roberts Appreciation Day" in honor of the sportscaster. In 1999, Roberts was inducted into the University of New Mexico Athletic Hall of Honor by the Alumni Lettermen's Association and received the Distinguished Service Award. Roberts was also inducted into the Albuquerque Sports Hall of Fame.

== Athletic conferences ==
Mountain West

The Lobos compete in the Mountain West Conference (MWC) in NCAA Division I, joining as a founding member in 1999. The Lobos won the MWC regular season championship in 2009, 2010, 2012, and 2013, and they won the conference tournament in 2005, 2012, 2013, 2014, and 2024.

In 1931, Lobo athletic teams began competing in the Border Intercollegiate Athletic Association, joining as a founding member along with other regional schools. The Lobos won the conference basketball championship in 1944 and 1945, seasons with shortened schedules due to World War II. UNM left the Border Conference in 1951 to join the Mountain States Conference, then known as the Skyline Eight.

In 1962, the Lobos became a founding member of the Western Athletic Conference (WAC). They led the WAC in overall winning percentage over the 17-season span from 1962 to 1979, posting a won-loss record of 328–161 (.671). The Lobos won the WAC regular season championship in 1964, 1968, 1974, 1978, and 1994, and they won the conference tournament in 1993 and 1996. The Lobos and seven other conference members left the WAC to form the MWC in 1999.

== Coaching records ==
=== Leaders ===
- Career wins, winning percentage (minimum 75 games coached):

Coach	Years	Win	Loss	Pct.
Steve Alford	2007–13	155	52	.749
Dave Bliss	1988–99	246	108	.695
Norm Ellenberger	1972–79	134	62	.684
Bob King	1962–72	175	89	.663
Richard Pitino	2021–2025	88	49	.642
Craig Neal	2013–17	76	52	.594
Gary Colson	1980–88	146	106	.579
Fran Fraschilla	1999–02	55	41	.573
Ritchie McKay	2002–07	82	69	.543
Roy Johnson	1920–30, 33–40	165	146	.531
Paul Weir	2017–2021	52	47	.525
Woody Clements	1944–51, 53–55	113	119	.487

=== Pre-Bob King era ===
The following table summarizes the records and accomplishments of the coaches before Bob King.

Years	Coach	Record	Pct.	Comment
1899–1910	none	15–10	.600	Sporadic games, six in 1908 most for one year
1910–1917	Ralph Hutchinson	32–8	.800	More frequent games, still irregular
1917–1919	John F. McGough	2–4	.333	
1920–1931	Roy Johnson	95–49	.660	Carlisle Gym opens, regular schedule established
1931–1933	Tom Churchill	23–12	.657	Join Border Conference
1933–1940	Roy Johnson	70–97	.425	Johnson overall, 165–146 (.531)
1940–1941	Dr. Benjamin Sacks	5–17	.227	
1941–1943	Willis Barnes	13–29	.310	
1943–1944	George White	11–2	.846	Border Conference champions '44
1944–1951	Woody Clements	84–76	.525	Border Conference champions '45
1951–1952	Berl Huffman	6–19	.240	Join Skyline Eight
1952–1955	Woody Clements	29–43	.403	Clements overall, 113–119 (.487)
1955–1958	Bill Stockton	14–58	.194	
1958–1962	Bob Sweeney	21–75	.219	

Notes:

- Johnson, 104–38 (.732) from 1924 to 1934; 137–73 (.652) after 1936; 28–73 (.277) in last four seasons
- Clements, 41–19 (.683) from 1944 to 1947, 72–100 (.419) thereafter
- Pre-Border Conference: 145–70 (.674) from 1899 to 1931
- Border Conference: 205–235 (.466) from 1931 to 1951
- Skyline Eight: 70–195 (.264) from 1951 to 1962
- Pre-Bob King total: 425–509 (.455)
- Total Win/Loss (1889–2017): 1500–1110 (.575)

Conference Season Championships (12: 5 WAC, 5 MWC, 2 Border)

- 4 – Steve Alford (MWC: 2009, 2010, 2012, 2013)
- 2 – Bob King (WAC: 1964, 1968)
- 2 – Norm Ellenberger (WAC: 1974, 1978)
- 1 – George Ellis (Border: 1944)
- 1 – Woody Clements (Border: 1945)
- 1 – Dave Bliss (WAC: 1994)
- 1 - Richard Pitino (MWC: 2025)

Conference Tournament Championships (7: 5 MWC, 2 WAC)

- 2 – Dave Bliss (WAC: 1993, 1996)
- 2 – Steve Alford (MWC: 2012, 2013)
- 1 – Ritchie McKay (MWC: 2005)
- 1 – Craig Neal (MWC: 2014)
- 1 – Richard Pitino (MWC: 2024)

NCAA Tournament Appearances (17: 9–18 record)

- 7 – Dave Bliss (1991, 1993–94, 1996–99), 4–7 record in NCAA tournament
- 3 – Steve Alford (2010, 2012, 2013), 2–3
- 2 – Norm Ellenberger (1974, 1978), 2–2
- 2 – Richard Pitino (2024, 2025), 1–2
- 1 – Bob King (1968), 0–2
- 1 – Ritchie McKay (2005), 0–1
- 1 – Craig Neal (2014), 0–1

20-win seasons (31)

- 10 – Dave Bliss (high: 28)
- 6 – Steve Alford (30 – school record)
- 3 – Norm Ellenberger (24)
- 3 – Gary Colson (25)
- 3 - Richard Pitino (27)
- 2 – Bob King (23)
- 1 – Fran Fraschilla (21)
- 1 – Ritchie McKay (26)
- 1 – Craig Neal (27)
- 1 – Eric Olen (26)

30-win seasons (1)

- 1 – Steve Alford (30 – school record)

=== Individual and team records ===
Individual and team records are published in detail in the 2013–14 Lobo Media Guide.

=== National rankings ===
The Lobos attained their first national ranking in the 1964–65 season, reaching #10 in the AP poll. They spent about half of the 1966–67 season in the top six nationally, reaching #3, their highest ranking ever. They were ranked in the top ten for much of the 1967–68 season, peaking at #4, and they were in the top 20 most of the following season. They were ranked for much of the 1973–74 season, reaching #8, and again in 1977–78 when they peaked at #5. They were ranked briefly in 1988 and 1993, then throughout 1996 to 1999. They have been regularly ranked from the 2009–10 through the 2013–14 seasons.

== Post-season results ==
=== Western Athletic Conference tournament ===
The Lobos compiled a 22–14 record in WAC conference tournaments, reaching the final six times and winning the championship twice.

Year	Champion	Score	Runner-up	Arena	City	Tournament MVP
1984	UTEP	44–38	New Mexico	Special Events Center	El Paso, Texas	Juden Smith, UTEP
1987	Wyoming	64–62	New Mexico	The Pit	Albuquerque, New Mexico	Eric Leckner, Wyoming
1993	New Mexico	76–65	UTEP	Delta Center	Salt Lake City	Ike Williams, New Mexico
1996	New Mexico	64–60	Utah	The Pit	Albuquerque, New Mexico	Kenny Thomas, New Mexico
1998	UNLV	56–51	New Mexico	Thomas & Mack Center	Las Vegas	Kenny Thomas, New Mexico
1999	Utah	60–45	New Mexico	Thomas & Mack Center	Las Vegas	Alex Jensen, Utah

=== Mountain West Conference tournament ===
The Lobos have compiled a 20–11 record in MWC tournaments, reaching the final seven times and winning the championship five times.

Year	Champion	Score	Runner-up	Arena	City	Tournament MVP
2001	BYU	69–65	New Mexico	Thomas & Mack Center	Paradise, Nevada	Mekeli Wesley, BYU
2005	New Mexico	60–56	Utah	Pepsi Center	Denver	Danny Granger, New Mexico
2012	New Mexico	68–59	San Diego State	Thomas & Mack Center	Paradise, Nevada	Drew Gordon, New Mexico
2013	New Mexico	63–56	UNLV	Thomas & Mack Center	Paradise, Nevada	Tony Snell, New Mexico
2014	New Mexico	64–58	San Diego State	Thomas & Mack Center	Paradise, Nevada	Cameron Bairstow, New Mexico
2018	San Diego State	82–75	New Mexico	Thomas & Mack Center	Paradise, Nevada	Trey Kell, San Diego State
2024	New Mexico	68–61	San Diego State	Thomas & Mack Center	Paradise, Nevada	Jaelen House, New Mexico

=== NCAA tournament ===
New Mexico has a history of disappointing performances in the NCAA tournament, suffering noteworthy upsets in 1968, 1978, 1993, 2010, 2013, and 2014. The Lobos have made 17 appearances in the NCAA tournament, compiling an overall record of 9–18.

Year	Seed	Round	Opponent	Result
1968		Round of 23; Sweet Sixteen; Regional 3rd place	Bye; Santa Clara; New Mexico State	— L 73–86; L 58–62
1974		Round of 25; Sweet Sixteen; Regional 3rd place	Idaho State; San Francisco; Dayton	W 73–65; L 61–64; W 66–61
1978		Round of 32	Cal State Fullerton	L 85–90
1991	14 E	Round of 64	(3) Oklahoma State	L 54–67
1993	5 W	Round of 64	(12) George Washington	L 68–82
1994	10 W	Round of 64	(7) Virginia	L 54–57
1996	7 E	Round of 64; Round of 32	(10) Kansas State (2) Georgetown	W 69–48; L 62–73
1997	3 E	Round of 64; Round of 32	(14) Old Dominion (6) #25 Louisville	W 59–55; L 63–64
1998	4 S	Round of 64; Round of 32	(13) Butler (5) Syracuse	W 79–62; L 46–56
1999	9 W	Round of 64; Round of 32	(8) Missouri (1) #3 Connecticut	W 61–59; L 56–78
2005	12 E	Round of 64	(5) Villanova	L 47–55
2010	3 E	Round of 64; Round of 32	(14) Montana (11) Washington	W 62–57; L 64–82
2012	5 W	Round of 64; Round of 32	(12) Long Beach State (4) #17 Louisville	W 75–68; L 56–59
2013	3 W	Round of 64	(14) Harvard	L 62–68
2014	7 S	Round of 64	(10) Stanford	L 53–58
2024	11 W	Round of 64	(6) Clemson	L 56–77
2025	10 S	Round of 64; Round of 32	(7) Marquette (2) Michigan State	W 75–66; L 63–71

=== NIT ===
The Lobos have appeared in 21 National Invitation Tournaments with a combined record of 21–22.

Year	Round	Opponent	Result/Score
1964	Quarterfinals; Semifinals; Final	Drake; NYU; Bradley	W 65–60; W 72–65; L 54–86
1965	Quarterfinals	St. John's	L 54–61
1967	First round Quarterfinals	Syracuse; Rutgers	W 66–64; L 60–65
1973	First round	Virginia Tech	L 63–65
1979	First round	Texas A&M	L 68–79
1984	First round	Lamar	L 61–64
1985	First round Second round	Texas A&M; Fresno State	W 80–67; L 55–66
1986	First round	Texas	L 66–69
1987	First round	Oregon State	L 82–85
1988	First round Second round Quarterfinals	Pepperdine; Oregon; Ohio State	W 86–75; W 78–59; L 65–68
1989	First round Second round Quarterfinals	Santa Clara; Pepperdine; Saint Louis	W 91–76; W 86–69; L 65–66
1990	First round Second round Quarterfinals; Semifinals; 3rd place game	Oregon; Oklahoma State; Hawaii; Saint Louis; Penn State	W 89–78; W 90–88; W 80–58; L 73–80; L 81–83
1992	First round Second round Quarterfinals	Louisiana Tech; Washington State; Virginia	W 90–84; W 79–71; L 71–76
2000	First round Second round	South Florida; Wake Forest	W 64–58; L 65–72
2001	First round Second round Quarterfinals	Baylor; Pepperdine; Memphis	W 83–73; W 81–75; L 63–81
2002	First round	Minnesota	L 62–96
2008	First round	California	L 66–68
2009	First round Second round	Nebraska; Notre Dame	W 83–71; L 68–70
2011	First round Second round	UTEP; Alabama	W 69–57; L 67–74
2023	First round	Utah Valley	L 69–83
2026	First round Second round Quarterfinals; Semifinals	Sam Houston; George Washington; Saint Joseph's; Tulsa	W 107–83; W 86–61; W 84–69; L 69–74

=== NAIA ===
The Lobos appeared in the NAIA Basketball tournament one time with a record of 0–1.

Year	Round	Opponent	Result
1947	First round	Hamline	L 49–71
