= John Koenig =

John Koenig may refer to:

- John Koenig (athletic director), American educator and administrator
- John Koenig (diplomat), American diplomat
- John Franklin Koenig (1924–2008), American artist
- John Koenig, creator of The Dictionary of Obscure Sorrows
- John Koenig (Space: 1999), a fictional character in the TV series Space: 1999

== See also ==
- Johann König (disambiguation)
