= John Koenig (athletic director) =

American college athletics administrator

Biographical details
- Born: December 21, 1943 (age 82); Effingham, Illinois, U.S.

Coaching career (HC unless noted)

Football
- 1969: Alton HS (IL) (assistant)
- 1970–1971: Marshall HS (IL)
- 1972: Marion HS (IL)

Track
- 1970–1972: Marshall HS (IL)
- 1972–1973: Marion HS (IL)

Administrative career (AD unless noted)
- 1975–1978: Dieterich Unit 30
- 1983–1987: Illinois (asst. AD)
- 1987–1988: New Mexico

John Edward Koenig (born December 21, 1943) is an American educator and administrator who was athletic director of the University of New Mexico from 1987 to 1988. In 1990, he pleaded guilty to defrauding the university.

== Early life and education ==
Koenig was born in Effingham, Illinois on December 21, 1943. He graduated from Southeast Missouri State University in 1966, earned his master's degree from Southern Illinois University Edwardsville, and attained a doctorate from Southern Illinois University Carbondale.

== Career ==
Koenig taught and coached in Flora, Granite City, Alton, Marshall, and Marion, Illinois. He was also an instructor at Lake Land College and Southern Illinois University Carbondale and was a visiting lecturer at Southeast Missouri State University's college of education. He joined SEMO's faculty full-time in 1978 as director of the University Schools. In 1981, he became the university's assistant to the vice president for academic services. In this role, he was a liaison between academic services and the intercollegiate athletics office. He left SEMO in 1983 to become the assistant athletic director in charge of finances at the University of Illinois Urbana-Champaign.

On March 20, 1987, Koenig was named director of athletics at the University of New Mexico. He succeeded the retiring John Bridgers on July 1, 1987. UNM was unaware that at the time of Koenig's hiring, Illinois was auditing his travel vouchers and expense reports for alleged discrepancies. Koenig repaid the University of Illinois a reported $11,000 in the summer of 1987.

In 1988, Koenig forced the resignation of Gary Colson, who had rebuilt the New Mexico Lobos men's basketball program after the Lobogate scandal. He attempted to hire three-time NCAA Division I men's basketball champion Bob Knight, but Knight chose to remain at Indiana. SMU's Dave Bliss, a former assistant under Knight, was hired instead. Bliss coached the Lobos from 1989 to 1999 and amassed a 246–108 record. He is New Mexico's all time winningest coach.

Koenig's unauthorized use of school funds at Illinois became public in July 1988. Later that month, The Albuquerque Tribune reported that it found five instances of double payments to Koenig during his time at UNM. On July 22, 1988, he admitted to receiving inappropriate travel and entertainment imbursements and resigned. His departure led to an audit of UNM's financial records. On March 16, 1989, a Bernalillo County grand jury indicted Koenig on 47 counts of fraud for misappropriating around $25,000 in university funds through unauthorized reimbursement and double-billing. His two associate athletic directors, Mike Dill and Terry Hearne, were also indicted. On February 9, 1990, Koenig pleaded guilty to three counts of tampering with evidence, two counts of fraud, and one count of criminal solicitation. He was sentenced to nine years of probation and ordered to pay $35,000 in restitution.

In 1991, Koenig became president of the Child Guidance Center in Jacksonville, Florida. He was fired in October 1994 for allegedly spending $244,000 on unauthorized expenses, including football tickets, club memberships, and a car lease. On February 2, 1996, he pleaded guilty to organized fraud and was sentenced to 14 1/4 months in prison and 10 years probation. He was also ordered to pay back $120,000.
