= List of Marshall Thundering Herd men's basketball seasons =

The Marshall Thundering Herd college basketball team compete as part of the National Collegiate Athletic Association (NCAA) Division I, representing Marshall University in the Sun Belt Conference (SBC). Marshall has played their home games at the Cam Henderson Center in Huntington, West Virginia since 1981. The team's current head coach is Cornelius Jackson, who was hired in March 2024.

The Thundering Herd fielded their first team in 1906–07. They have played 112 seasons of basketball, (Note: Marshall did not field teams for the 1910-11, 1914-18, or 1919-20 seasons.) compiling a record of 1599–1188–2 and winning seven regular season conference championships and four conference tournaments. The Thundering Herd appeared in the NCAA tournament six times, (Note: The NCAA vacated Marshall's loss in the 1987 NCAA tournament. As such, the 1987 appearance in the tournament is not included in the official NCAA listing for Marshall.) compiling a 1–6 record, and they appeared in the National Invitation Tournament (NIT) five times. Additionally, Marshall has won two postseason championships, the NAIA tournament in 1947 and the CollegeInsider.com Postseason Tournament (CIT) in 2019.

== Season results ==
Record table
Season	Coach	Overall	Conference	Standing	Postseason
Independent (1906–1932)
1906–07	L.B. Crotty	0–1			
1907–08	L.B. Crotty	5–0–1			
1908–09	Boyd Chambers	6–2			
1909–10	Boyd Chambers	3–3			
1911–12	Boyd Chambers	2–2			
1912–13	Boyd Chambers	1–4			
1913–14	Boyd Chambers	2–5			
1918–19	Arch Reilly	2–5			
1920–21	Skeeter Shelton	6–9			
1921–22	Herbert Cramer	5–4–1			
1922–23	J. E .R. Barnes	1–3			
1923–24	Bill Strickling	8–7			
1924–25	Russ Meredith	12–6			
1925–26	Charles Tallman	10–7			
1926–27	Bill Strickling	7–10			
1927–28	Johnny Stuart	11–10			
1928–29	Johnny Stuart	14–8			
1929–30	Johnny Stuart	12–3			
1930–31	Johnny Stuart	9–8			
1931–32	Tom Dandelet	7–12			
Buckeye Athletic Association (1932–1939)
1932–33	Tom Dandelet	10–9	3–6	4th	
1933–34	Tom Dandelet	13–8	6–4	2nd	
1934–35	Tom Dandelet	12–9	3–6	4th	
1935–36	Cam Henderson	6–10	1–8	6th	
1936–37	Cam Henderson	21–8	9–1	1st	
1937–38	Cam Henderson	28–4	10–0	1st	NAIA second round
1938–39	Cam Henderson	22–5	8–1	1st	
Independent (1939–1948)
1939–40	Cam Henderson	25–4			
1940–41	Cam Henderson	14–9			
1941–42	Cam Henderson	15–9			
1942–43	Cam Henderson	10–7			
1943-44	Cam Henderson	15–7			
1944-45	Cam Henderson	17–9			
1945–46	Cam Henderson	25–10			
1946–47	Cam Henderson	32–4			NAIA champions
1947–48	Cam Henderson	22–11			NAIA second round
Ohio Valley Conference (1948–1952)
1948–49	Cam Henderson	16–12	2–2	4th	
1949–50	Cam Henderson	15–9	5–4	3rd	
1950–51	Cam Henderson	13–13	2–6	6th	
1951–52	Cam Henderson	15–11	5–7	4th	
Independent (1952–1953)
1952–53	Cam Henderson	20–4			
Mid-American Conference (1953–1969)
1953–54	Cam Henderson	13–8	6–7	4th	
1954–55	Cam Henderson	17–4	10–4	2nd	
1955–56	Jule Rivlin	18–5	10–2	1st	NCAA first round
1956–57	Jule Rivlin	15–9	8–4	2nd	
1957–58	Jule Rivlin	17–7	9–3	2nd	
1958–59	Jule Rivlin	12–12	6–6	T–3rd	
1959–60	Jule Rivlin	10–13	4–8	6th	
1960–61	Jule Rivlin	11–13	5–7	4th	
1961–62	Jule Rivlin	10–13	6–6	T–4th	
1962–63	Jule Rivlin	7–16	1–11	T–6th	
1963–64	Ellis Johnson	6–17	1–11	7th	
1964–65	Ellis Johnson	4–20	1-11	7th	
1965–66	Ellis Johnson	12–12	4–8	T–5th	
1966–67	Ellis Johnson	20–8	10–2	2nd	NIT Fourth Place
1967–68	Ellis Johnson	17–8	9–3	2nd	NIT first round
1968–69	Ellis Johnson	9–15	3–9	T–6th	
Independent (1969–1977)
1969–70	Stewart Way	9–14			
1970–71	Stewart Way	16–10			
1971–72	Carl Tacy	23–4			NCAA University Division first round
1972–73	Bob Daniels	20–7			NIT first round
1973–74	Bob Daniels	17–9			
1974–75	Bob Daniels	13–13			
1975–76	Bob Daniels	13–14			
1976–77	Bob Daniels	8–19			
Southern Conference (1977–1997)
1977–78	Stu Aberdeen	14–15	8–5	3rd	
1978–79	Stu Aberdeen	11–16	5–8	5th	
1979–80	Bob Zuffelato	17–12	10–6	2nd	
1980–81	Bob Zuffelato	18–10	8–8	T–6th	
1981–82	Bob Zuffelato	16–11	8–8	T–4th	
1982–83	Bob Zuffelato	20–8	13–3	2nd	
1983–84	Rick Huckabay	25–6	13–3	1st	NCAA Division I first round
1984–85	Rick Huckabay	21–13	12–4	2nd	NCAA Division I first round
1985–86	Rick Huckabay	19–11	10–6	T–2nd	
1986–87	Rick Huckabay	25–6	15-1	1st	NCAA Division I first round
1987–88	Rick Huckabay	24–8	14–2	1st	NIT first round
1988–89	Rick Huckabay	15–15	6–8	6th	
1989–90	Dana Altman	15–13	9–5	5th	
1990–91	Dwight Freeman	14–14	7–7	5th	
1991–92	Dwight Freeman	7–22	3–11	6th	
1992–93	Dwight Freeman	16–11	11–7	4th	
1993–94	Dwight Freeman	9–18	7–11	7th	
1994–95	Billy Donovan	18–9	10–4	1st (North)	
1995–96	Billy Donovan	17–11	8–6	3rd (North)	
1996–97	Greg White	20–9	10–4	T–1st (North)	
Mid-American Conference (1997–2005)
1997–98	Greg White	11–16	7–11	T–3rd (East)	
1998–99	Greg White	16–11	11–7	6th (East)	
1999–00	Greg White	21–9	11–7	T–3rd (East)	
2000–01	Greg White	18–9	12–6	T–2nd (East)	
2001–02	Greg White	15–15	8–10	5th (East)	
2002–03	Greg White	14–15	9–9	T–3rd (East)	
2003–04	Ron Jirsa	12–17	8–10	4th (East)	
2004–05	Ron Jirsa	6–22	3–15	6th (East)	
Conference USA (2005–2022)
2005–06	Ron Jirsa	12–16	5–9	9th	
2006–07	Ron Jirsa	13–19	7–9	T–8th	
2007–08	Donnie Jones	16–14	8–8	6th	
2008–09	Donnie Jones	15–17	7–9	6th	
2009–10	Donnie Jones	24–10	11–5	T–3rd	CIT Quarterfinalists
2010–11	Tom Herrion	22–12	9–7	T–5th	CIT first round
2011–12	Tom Herrion	21–14	9–7	T–5th	NIT first round
2012–13	Tom Herrion	13–19	6–10	T–9th	
2013–14	Tom Herrion	11–22	4–12	T–14th	
2014–15	Dan D'Antoni	11–21	7–11	T–11th	
2015–16	Dan D'Antoni	17–16	12–6	T–3rd	
2016–17	Dan D'Antoni	20–15	10–8	6th	
2017–18	Dan D'Antoni	25–11	12–6	4th	NCAA Division I Round of 32
2018–19	Dan D'Antoni	23–14	11–7	6th	CIT champions
2019–20	Dan D'Antoni	17–15	10-8	6th	
2020–21	Dan D'Antoni	15–7	9–5	3rd (East)	
2021–22	Dan D'Antoni	12–21	4–14	7th (East)	
Sun Belt Conference (2022–present)
2022–23	Dan D’Antoni	24–8	13–5	T–2nd	
2023–24	Dan D’Antoni	13–20	7–11	T–10th	
2024–25	Cornelius Jackson	20–13	12–6	5th	
2025–26	Cornelius Jackson	19–13	11–7	T–2nd	
Total:		1638–1214–2			
National champion Postseason invitational champion Conference regular season champion Conference regular season and conference tournament champion Division regular season champion Division regular season and conference tournament champion Conference tournament champion
