= List of Marshall Thundering Herd men's basketball head coaches =

The Marshall Thundering Herd men's basketball program competes in the National Collegiate Athletic Association's (NCAA) Division I, representing Marshall University in Conference USA. The program has had 29 head coaches since it began play during the 1906–07 men's basketball season. Since March 2024, Cornelius Jackson has served as Marshall's head coach.

== Key ==
General
| # | Number of coaches (Note: A running total of the number of head coaches, thus, any coach who have two or more separate terms as head coach is only counted once.) |
| GC | Games coached |
| ^{†} | Elected to the Basketball Hall of Fame |
| SoCon | Southern Conference Coach of the Year |

Overall
| OW | Wins |
| OL | Losses |
| O% | Winning percentage |

Conference
| CW | Wins |
| CL | Losses |
| C% | Winning percentage |
| RCs | Regular Season Championships |
| TCs | Tournament Championships |

Postseason (Note: Postseason wins and losses include tournament games played in the National Association of Intercollegiate Basketball (now National Association of Intercollegiate Athletics), National Collegiate Athletic Association (NCAA), National Invitation Tournament (NIT), and CollegeInsider.com Postseason Tournament (CIT).)
| PW | Wins |
| PL | Losses |

== Coaches ==
Statistics correct as of the end of the 2025–26 NCAA Division I men's basketball season

| # | Name | Term | GC | OW | OL | O% | CW | CL | C% | PW | PL | RCs | TCs | Awards |
|---|---|---|---|---|---|---|---|---|---|---|---|---|---|---|
| 1 | L. B. Crotty | 1906–1908 | 7 | 5 | 1 | .786 | — | — | — | — | — | — | — | — |
| 2 | Boyd Chambers | 1908–1910; 1911–1914 | 30 | 14 | 16 | .467 | — | — | — | — | — | — | — | — |
| 3 | Arch Reilly | 1918–1919 | 7 | 2 | 5 | .286 | — | — | — | — | — | — | — | — |
| 4 | Skeeter Shelton | 1920–1921 | 15 | 6 | 9 | .400 | — | — | — | — | — | — | — | — |
| 5 | Herbert Cramer | 1921–1922 | 10 | 5 | 4 | .550 | — | — | — | — | — | — | — | — |
| 6 | J. E. R. Barnes | 1922–1923 | 4 | 1 | 3 | .250 | — | — | — | — | — | — | — | — |
| 7 | Bill Strickling | 1923–1924; 1926–1927 | 32 | 15 | 17 | .469 | — | — | — | — | — | — | — | — |
| 8 | Russ Meredith | 1924–1925 | 18 | 12 | 6 | .667 | — | — | — | — | — | — | — | — |
| 9 | Charles Tallman | 1925–1926 | 17 | 10 | 7 | .588 | — | — | — | — | — | — | — | — |
| 10 | Johnny Stuart | 1927–1931 | 75 | 46 | 29 | .613 | — | — | — | — | — | — | — | — |
| 11 | Tom Dandelet | 1931–1935 | 80 | 42 | 38 | .525 | 12 | 16 | .429 | — | — | 0 | — | — |
| 12 | Cam Henderson | 1935–1955 | 521 | 362 | 159 | .695 | 58 | 40 | .592 | 7 | 2 | 3 | — | — |
| 13 | Jule Rivlin | 1955–1963 | 188 | 100 | 88 | .532 | 49 | 47 | .510 | 0 | 1 | 1 | — | — |
| 14 | Ellis T. Johnson | 1963–1969 | 148 | 68 | 80 | .459 | 28 | 44 | .389 | 2 | 3 | 0 | 0 | — |
| 15 | Stewart Way | 1969–1971 | 49 | 25 | 24 | .510 | — | — | — | 0 | 0 | — | — | — |
| 16 | Carl Tacy | 1971–1972 | 27 | 23 | 4 | .852 | — | — | — | 0 | 1 | — | — | — |
| 17 | Bob Daniels | 1972–1977 | 133 | 71 | 62 | .534 | — | — | — | 0 | 1 | — | — | — |
| 18 | Stu Aberdeen | 1977–1979 | 56 | 25 | 31 | .446 | 13 | 13 | .500 | 0 | 0 | 0 | 0 | — |
| 19 | Bob Zuffelato | 1979–1983 | 112 | 71 | 41 | .634 | 26 | 22 | .560 | 0 | 0 | 0 | 0 | — |
| 20 | Rick Huckabay | 1983–1989 | 188 | 129 | 59 | .686 | 70 | 24 | .745 | 0 | 4 | 3 | 3 | SoCon (1984) |
| 21 | Dana Altman | 1989–1990 | 28 | 15 | 13 | .536 | 9 | 5 | .643 | 0 | 0 | 0 | 0 | — |
| 22 | Dwight Freeman | 1990–1994 | 111 | 46 | 65 | .414 | 28 | 36 | .438 | 0 | 0 | 0 | 0 | — |
| 23 | Billy Donovan^{†} | 1994–1996 | 55 | 35 | 20 | .636 | 18 | 10 | .643 | 0 | 0 | 0 | 0 | SoCon (1995) |
| 24 | Greg White | 1996–2003 | 199 | 115 | 84 | .578 | 68 | 54 | .557 | 0 | 0 | 1 | 0 | SoCon (1997) |
| 25 | Ron Jirsa | 2003–2007 | 117 | 43 | 74 | .368 | 23 | 43 | .348 | 0 | 0 | 0 | 0 | — |
| 26 | Donnie Jones | 2007–2010 | 96 | 55 | 41 | .573 | 26 | 22 | .542 | 1 | 1 | 0 | 0 | — |
| 27 | Tom Herrion | 2010–2014 | 134 | 67 | 67 | .500 | 28 | 36 | .438 | 0 | 2 | 0 | 0 | — |
| 28 | Dan D'Antoni | 2014–2024 | 325 | 177 | 148 | .545 | 95 | 81 | .540 | 5 | 1 | 0 | 1 | — |
| 29 | Cornelius Jackson | 2024–present | 64 | 39 | 25 | .609 | 23 | 13 | .639 | 0 | 0 | 0 | 0 | — |
