= List of Marshall Thundering Herd head football coaches =

The Marshall Thundering Herd college football team represents Marshall University in the East Division of the Sun Belt Conference. The Thundering Herd competes as part of the National Collegiate Athletic Association (NCAA) Division I Football Bowl Subdivision. The program has had 31 head coaches since it began play during the 1895 season. Since December 2024, Tony Gibson has served as Marshall's head coach.

== Key ==
Key to symbols in coaches list
General		Overall		Conference		Postseason (Note: Although the first Rose Bowl Game was played in 1902, it has been continuously played since the 1916 game, and is recognized as the oldest bowl game by the NCAA. "—" indicates any season prior to 1916 when postseason games were not played.)	
No.	Order of coaches (Note: A running total of the number of head coaches, with coaches who served separate tenures being counted only once. Interim head coaches are represented with "Int" and are not counted in the running total. "—" indicates the team played but either without a coach or no coach is on record. "X" indicates an interim year without play.)	GC	Games coached	CW	Conference wins	PW	Postseason wins
DC	Division championships	OW	Overall wins	CL	Conference losses	PL	Postseason losses
CC	Conference championships	OL	Overall losses	CT	Conference ties	PT	Postseason ties
NC	National championships	OT	Overall ties (Note: Overtime rules in college football were introduced in 1996, making ties impossible in the period since.)	C%	Conference winning percentage		
†	Elected to the College Football Hall of Fame	O%	Overall winning percentage (Note: When computing the win–loss percentage, a tie counts as half a win and half a loss.)				

== Coaches ==
List of head football coaches showing season(s) coached, overall records, conference records, postseason records, championships and selected awards (Note: Statistics correct as of the end of the 2024 college football season.)
#	Name	Term	GC	OW	OL	OT	O%	CW	CL	CT	C%	PW	PL	PT	CCs	NCs	National awards
1	George Ford	1903–1904	12	4	4	4	.500	—	—	—	—	—	—	—	—	—	
2	Alfred McCray	1905	8	6	2	0	.750	—	—	—	—	—	—	—	—	—	
3	Pearl Rardin	1906–1907	11	7	2	2	.727	—	—	—	—	—	—	—	—	—	
4	William G. Vinal	1908	6	0	6	0	.000	—	—	—	—	—	—	—	—	—	
5	Boyd Chambers	1909–1916	63	32	27	4	.540	—	—	—	—	—	—	—	—	—	
6	Burton Shipley	1917	9	1	7	1	.167	—	—	—	—	—	—	—	—	—	
7	Arch Reilly	1919	8	8	0	0	1.000	—	—	—	—	—	—	—	—	—	
8	Herbert Cramer	1920	8	0	8	0	.000	—	—	—	—	—	—	—	—	—	
9	Skeeter Shelton	1921–1922	17	11	6	1	.639	—	—	—	—	—	—	—	—	—	
10	Harrison Briggs	1923	8	1	7	0	.125	—	—	—	—	—	—	—	—	—	
11	Russ Meredith	1924	8	4	4	0	.500	—	—	—	—	—	—	—	—	—	
12	Charles Tallman	1925–1928	38	22	9	7	.671	15	2	2	.842	—	—	—	2	—	
13	John Maulbetsch	1929–1930	18	8	8	2	.500	7	1	1	.833	—	—	—	0	—	
14	Tom Dandelet	1931–1934	36	18	16	2	.528	9	10	1	.475	—	—	—	1	—	
15	Cam Henderson	1935–1949	119	68	46	5	.592	25	12	2	.667	0	1	0	1	—	
16	Pete Pederson	1950–1952	31	9	19	3	.339	6	6	0	.500	—	—	—	0	—	
17	Herb Royer	1953–1958	54	21	31	2	.407	10	21	0	.323	—	—	—	0	—	
18	Charlie Snyder	1959–1967	89	28	58	3	.331	13	36	1	.270	—	—	—	0	—	
19	Perry Moss	1968	10	0	9	1	.050	0	6	0	.000	—	—	—	0	—	
20	Rick Tolley	1969–1970	19	6	13	0	.316	—	—	—	—	—	—	—	—	—	
21	Jack Lengyel	1971–1974	42	9	33	0	.214	—	—	—	—	—	—	—	—	—	
22	Frank Ellwood	1975–1978	44	10	34	0	.227	0	10	0	.000	–	–	–	0	—	
23	Sonny Randle	1979–1983	55	12	42	1	.227	5	26	1	.172	—	—	—	0	—	
24	Stan Parrish	1984–1985	22	13	8	1	.614	5	7	1	.423	—	—	—	0	—	
25	George Chaump	1986–1989	55	33	16	1	.670	17	8	0	.680	4	2	0	1	—	
26	Jim Donnan^{†}	1990–1995	85	64	21	0	.753	34	11	0	.756	15	4	0	1	1	
27	Bob Pruett	1996–2004	117	94	23	—	.803	62	10	—	.861	9	2	—	6	1	
28	Mark Snyder	2005–2009	59	22	37	—	.373	17	23	—	.425	0	0	—	0	—	
Int	Rick Minter (Note: Mark Snyder resigned as head coach on November 29, 2009. Minter served as interim head coach for the 2009 Little Caesars Pizza Bowl win against Ohio.)	2009	1	1	0	—	1.000	—	—	—	—	1	0	—	0	—	
29	Doc Holliday	2010–2020	139	85	54	—	.612	55	30	—	.647	6	2	—	1	—	
30	Charles Huff	2021–2024	52	32	20	—	.615	20	12	—	.625	1	2	—	1	—	
31	Tony Gibson	2025–	12	5	7	—	.417	3	5	—	.375	0	0	—	0	—	
