= South Carolina Gamecocks men's basketball statistical leaders =

The South Carolina Gamecocks men's basketball statistical leaders are individual statistical leaders of the South Carolina Gamecocks men's basketball program in various categories, including points, three-pointers, assists, blocks, rebounds, and steals. Within those areas, the lists identify single-game, single-season, and career leaders. The Gamecocks represent the University of South Carolina in the NCAA's Southeastern Conference.

South Carolina began competing in intercollegiate basketball in 1908. However, the school's record book does not generally list records from before the 1950s, as records from before this period are often incomplete and inconsistent. Since scoring was much lower in this era, and teams played much fewer games during a typical season, it is likely that few or no players from this era would appear on these lists anyway.

The NCAA did not officially record assists as a stat until the 1983–84 season, and blocks and steals until the 1985–86 season, but South Carolina's record books includes players in these stats before these seasons. These lists are updated through the end of the 2020–21 season.

== Scoring ==
Career
Rk	Player	Points	Seasons
1	BJ McKie	2119	1995–96 1996–97 1997–98 1998–99
2	Alex English	1972	1972–73 1973–74 1974–75 1975–76
3	Sindarius Thornwell	1941	2013–14 2014–15 2015–16 2016–17
4	John Roche	1910	1968–69 1969–70 1970–71
5	Devan Downey	1901	2007–08 2008–09 2009–10
6	Jimmy Foster	1745	1980–81 1981–82 1982–83 1983–84
7	Mike Dunleavy	1586	1972–73 1973–74 1974–75 1975–76
8	Carlos Powell	1541	2001–02 2002–03 2003–04 2004–05
9	Jim Slaughter	1521	1947–48 1948–49 1949–50 1950–51
10	Chris Silva	1509	2015–16 2016–17 2017–18 2018–19

Season
Rk	Player	Points	Season
1	Grady Wallace	906	1956–57
2	Zam Fredrick	781	1980–81
3	Devan Downey	699	2009–10
4	Sindarius Thornwell	663	2016–17
5	John Roche	662	1968–69
6	John Roche	625	1970–71
7	John Roche	623	1969–70
8	Devan Downey	614	2008–09
9	Alex English	610	1975–76
10	Tarence Kinsey	602	2005–06

Single game
Rk	Player	Points	Season	Opponent
1	John Roche	56	1970–71	Furman
2	Grady Wallace	54	1956–57	Georgia
3	Grady Wallace	45	1956–57	N.C. State
4	Sindarius Thornwell	44	2016–17	Alabama
	Grady Wallace	44	1956–57	Virginia
	Grady Wallace	44	1956–57	Clemson
	Cedrick Hordges	44	1979–80	Biscayne

== Rebounds ==
Career
Rk	Player	Rebounds	Seasons
1	Lee Collins	1159	1952–53 1953–54 1954–55 1955–56
2	Tom Owens	1116	1968–69 1969–70 1970–71
3	Alex English	1064	1972–73 1973–74 1974–75 1975–76
4	Joe Smith	1001	1951–52 1952–53 1953–54 1954–55
5	Jimmy Foster	1000	1980–81 1981–82 1982–83 1983–84
6	Chris Silva	876	2015–16 2016–17 2017–18 2018–19
7	Michael Carrera	800	2012–13 2013–14 2014–15 2015–16
8	Brandon Wallace	775	2003–04 2004–05 2005–06 2006–07
9	Darryl Martin	758	1985–86 1986–87 1987–88
10	Mike Callahan	744	1957–58 1958–59 1959–60

Season
Rk	Player	Rebounds	Season
1	Lee Collins	434	1954–55
2	Grady Wallace	319	1956–57
3	Jim Slaughter	413	1950–51
4	Lee Collins	404	1955–56
5	Tom Owens	393	1969–70
6	Tom Owens	363	1968–69
7	Tom Owens	360	1970–71
	Fred Lentz	360	1956–57
9	Jim Fox	313	1964–65
10	Joe Smith	310	1952–53
	Danny Traylor	310	1971–72

Single game
Rk	Player	Rebounds	Season	Opponent
1	Gary Gregor	35	1966–67	Elon
2	Lee Collins	33	1955–56	The Citadel
3	Tom Owens	28	1969–70	Erskine
	Fred Lentz	28	1956–57	Clemson
5	Lee Collins	27	1955–56	Furman

== Assists ==
Career
Rk	Player	Assists	Seasons
1	Melvin Watson	543	1994–95 1995–96 1996–97 1997–98
2	Jack Gilloon	533	1974–75 1975–76 1976–77 1977–78
3	Tre' Kelley	510	2003–04 2004–05 2005–06 2006–07
4	Aaron Lucas	451	1998–99 1999–00 2000–01 2001–02
5	Michael Foster	440	1983–84 1984–85 1985–86 1986–87
6	Barry Manning	437	1987–88 1988–89 1989–90 1990–91 1991–92
7	Chuck Eidson	428	1999–00 2000–01 2001–02 2002–03
8	Devan Downey	420	2007–08 2008–09 2009–10
9	Sindarius Thornwell	390	2013–14 2014–15 2015–16 2016–17
10	BJ McKie	382	1995–96 1996–97 1997–98 1998–99

Season
Rk	Player	Assists	Season
1	Gerald Peacock	182	1982–83
2	Tre' Kelley	174	2005–06
3	Devan Downey	172	2007–08
4	Melvin Watson	157	1996–97
5	Jack Gilloon	156	1975–76
6	Kevin Joyce	152	1972–73
7	Tre' Kelley	149	2006–07
8	Aaron Lucas	145	2001–02
	Michael Foster	145	1984–85
10	Ta'Lon Cooper	144	2023–24

Single game
Rk	Player	Assists	Season	Opponent
1	Jack Gilloon	17	1975–76	Ga. Southern
2	Jack Gilloon	16	1975–76	Villanova
3	Terry Gould	14	1986–87	The Citadel
4	Jack Thompson	13	1966–67	Virginia
	John Roche	13	1969–70	Maryland
	Gerald Peacock	13	1982–83	DePaul
	Gerald Peacock	13	1982–83	Old Dominion

== Steals ==
Career
Rk	Player	Steals	Seasons
1	Devan Downey	277	2007–08 2008–09 2009–10
2	Chuck Eidson	272	1999–00 2000–01 2001–02 2002–03
3	Barry Manning	223	1987–88 1988–89 1989–90 1990–91 1991–92
4	Sindarius Thornwell	199	2013–14 2014–15 2015–16 2016–17
5	Melvin Watson	194	1994–95 1995–96 1996–97 1997–98
6	BJ McKie	165	1995–96 1996–97 1997–98 1998–99
	Michael Foster	165	1983–84 1984–85 1985–86 1986–87
8	Jamie Watson	152	1990–91 1991–92 1992–93 1993–94
9	Tarence Kinsey	142	2002–03 2003–04 2004–05 2005–06
10	Carlos Powell	141	2001–02 2002–03 2003–04 2004–05

Season
Rk	Player	Steals	Season
1	Devan Downey	103	2007–08
2	Chuck Eidson	93	1999–00
3	Chuck Eidson	91	2001–02
4	Devan Downey	89	2008–09
5	Devan Downey	85	2009–10
6	Barry Manning	73	1990–91
7	Sindarius Thornwell	66	2016–17
	Barry Manning	66	1991–92
9	Renaldo Balkman	65	2005–06
10	Tarence Kinsey	60	2005–06
	Chuck Eidson	60	2002–03

Single game
Rk	Player	Steals	Season	Opponent
1	Bojan Popovic	9	1989–90	So. Mississippi
2	Devan Downey	7	2009–10	Furman
	Devan Downey	7	2008–09	NC Central
	Devan Downey	7	2008–09	Princeton
	Devan Downey	7	2007–08	Alabama
	Devan Downey	7	2007–08	Radford
	Chuck Eidson	7	2001–02	Florida
	Aaron Lucas	7	2001–02	Vanderbilt
	Chuck Eidson	7	1999–00	Clemson
	Barry Manning	7	1990–91	Furman

== Blocks ==
Career
Rk	Player	Blocks	Seasons
1	Sam Muldrow	275	2007–08 2008–09 2009–10 2010–11
2	Brandon Wallace	249	2003–04 2004–05 2005–06 2006–07
3	Danny Traylor	235	1970–71 1971–72 1972–73
4	Alex English	230	1972–73 1973–74 1974–75 1975–76
5	Jeff Roulston	226	1988–89 1989–90 1990–91 1991–92
6	Chris Silva	186	2015–16 2016–17 2017–18 2018–19
7	Mike Brittain	160	1981–82 1982–83 1983–84 1984–85
8	Ryan Stack	124	1994–95 1995–96 1996–97 1997–98
9	Tony Kitchings	123	1998–99 1999–00 2000–01 2001–02 2002–03

Season
Rk	Player	Blocks	Season
1	Danny Traylor	122	1971–72
2	Danny Traylor	113	1972–73
3	Sam Muldrow	103	2010–11
4	Sam Muldrow	97	2009–10
5	Brandon Wallace	86	2006–07
6	Jeff Roulston	77	1990–91
7	Brandon Wallace	73	2005–06
8	Damontre Harris	71	2011–12
9	Alex English	69	1974–75
10	Jeff Roulston	68	1989–90

Single game
Rk	Player	Blocks	Season	Opponent
1	Sam Muldrow	10	2010–11	Vanderbilt
2	Jeff Roulston	9	1989–90	Tennessee
	Danny Traylor	9	1971–72	Niagara
	Danny Traylor	9	1971–72	Fordham
5	Sam Muldrow	8	2009–10	Boston College
	Brandon Wallace	8	2006–07	C of C
	Danny Traylor	8	1972–73	Marshall
	Danny Traylor	8	1972–73	Niagara
	Danny Traylor	8	1972–73	Lafayette
