= 1973 NCAA University Division basketball tournament =

Edition of USA college basketball tournament

- NCAA logo from 1971 to 1979
- Teams: 25
- Finals site: St. Louis Arena, St. Louis, Missouri
- Champions: UCLA Bruins (9th title, 9th title game, 10th Final Four)
- Runner-up: Memphis State Tigers (1st title game, 1st Final Four)
- Semifinalists: Indiana Hoosiers (3rd Final Four); Providence Friars (1st Final Four)
- Winning coach: John Wooden (9th title)
- MOP: Bill Walton (UCLA)
- Attendance: 163,160
- Top scorer: Ernie DiGregorio (Providence) (128 points)

The 1973 NCAA University Division basketball tournament involved 25 schools playing in single-elimination play to determine the national champion of men's NCAA University Division (now Division I, created later in 1973) college basketball. The 35th annual edition of the tournament began on Saturday, March 10, and ended with the championship game on Monday, March 26, at St. Louis Arena in St. Louis, Missouri. A total of 29 games were played, including a third-place game in each region and a national third-place game.

Led by longtime head coach John Wooden, the UCLA Bruins won their seventh consecutive national title with an 87–66 victory in the final game over Memphis State, coached by Gene Bartow, a future head coach at UCLA. Junior center Bill Walton of UCLA was named the tournament's Most Outstanding Player.

This was the first year that the championship game was held on a Monday night, with Saturday semifinals. Previously, the championship game was on Saturday, with the semifinals on either Thursday or Friday. Also, this was the first year matchups in the semifinals rotated; previously, it was East vs. Mideast and West vs. Midwest every year.

== Tournament notes ==
The UCLA–Memphis State championship game made USA Today′s 2002 list of the greatest NCAA tournament games of all time at #18. Bill Walton set a championship game record, hitting 21 of 22 shots and scoring 44 points.

This tournament marked the first appearance of Bob Knight as coach of Indiana University.

The participation for this tournament, as well as the previous tournament, for Southwestern Louisiana (now the University of Louisiana at Lafayette) was vacated on August 5, 1973, when the NCAA Committee on Infractions ruled the university guilty of over 100 violations, including impermissible benefits and doctoring high school transcripts of players. USL's program was shut down for the 1973–74 and 1974–75 seasons, all other Ragin Cajun' athletic programs were placed on three years' probation and banned from postseason participation, and the university was stripped of voting rights at the NCAA convention until 1977 (the NCAA originally planned to expel USL from the organization, but that sanction was downgraded in January 1974).

== Schedule and venues ==
The following are the sites that were selected to host each round of the 1973 tournament:

First round

- March 10
  - East Region
    - Alumni Hall, Jamaica, New York (Host: St. John's University)
    - The Palestra, Philadelphia, Pennsylvania (Hosts: University of Pennsylvania, Ivy League)
    - William & Mary Hall, Williamsburg, Virginia (Host: The College of William & Mary)
  - Mideast Region
    - University of Dayton Arena, Dayton, Ohio (Host: University of Dayton)
  - Midwest Region
    - Levitt Arena, Wichita, Kansas (Host: Wichita State University)
  - West Region
    - Dee Glen Smith Spectrum, Logan, Utah (Host: Utah State University)

Regional semifinals, 3rd-place games, and finals (Sweet Sixteen and Elite Eight)

- March 15 and 17
  - East Regional, Charlotte Coliseum, Charlotte, North Carolina (Host: Davidson College)
  - Mideast Regional, Memorial Gymnasium, Nashville, Tennessee (Host: Vanderbilt University)
  - Midwest Regional, Hofheinz Pavilion, Houston, Texas (Hosts: University of Houston, Southwest Conference)
  - West Regional, Pauley Pavilion, Los Angeles, California (Host: UCLA)

National semifinals, 3rd-place game, and championship (Final Four and championship)

- March 24 and 26
  - St. Louis Arena, St. Louis, Missouri (Host: Missouri Valley Conference)

== Teams ==
Region	Team	Coach	Conference	Finished	Final Opponent	Score
East
East	Furman	Joe Williams	Southern	First round	Syracuse	L 83–82
East	Maryland	Lefty Driesell	Atlantic Coast	Regional Runner-up	Providence	L 103–89
East	Penn	Chuck Daly	Ivy League	Regional Fourth Place	Syracuse	L 69–68
East	Providence	Dave Gavitt	Independent	Fourth Place	Indiana	L 97–79
East	St. John's	Frank Mulzoff	Independent	First round	Penn	L 62–61
East	Saint Joseph's	Jack McKinney	Middle Atlantic	First round	Providence	L 89–76
East	Syracuse	Roy Danforth	Independent	Regional third place	Penn	W 69–68
Mideast
Mideast	Austin Peay	Lake Kelly	Ohio Valley	Regional Fourth Place	Marquette	L 88–73
Mideast	Indiana	Bob Knight	Big Ten	Third Place	Providence	W 97–79
Mideast	Jacksonville	Tom Wasdin	Independent	First round	Austin Peay	L 77–75
Mideast	Kentucky	Joe B. Hall	Southeastern	Regional Runner-up	Indiana	L 72–65
Mideast	Marquette	Al McGuire	Independent	Regional third place	Austin Peay	W 88–73
Mideast	Miami (OH)	Darrell Hedric	Mid-American	First round	Marquette	L 77–62
Midwest
Midwest	Houston	Guy Lewis	Independent	First round	Southwestern Louisiana	L 102–89
Midwest	Kansas State	Jack Hartman	Big Eight	Regional Runner-up	Memphis State	L 92–72
Midwest	Southwestern Louisiana (Vacated)	Beryl Shipley	Southland	Regional Fourth Place	South Carolina	L 90–85
Midwest	Memphis State	Gene Bartow	Missouri Valley	Runner Up	UCLA	L 87–66
Midwest	South Carolina	Frank McGuire	Independent	Regional third place	Southwestern Louisiana	W 90–85
Midwest	Texas Tech	Gerald Myers	Southwest	First round	South Carolina	L 78–70
West
West	Arizona State	Ned Wulk	Western Athletic	Regional Fourth Place	Long Beach State	L 84–80
West	Long Beach State	Jerry Tarkanian	Pacific Coast	Regional third place	Arizona State	W 84–80
West	Oklahoma City	Abe Lemons	Independent	First round	Arizona State	L 103–78
West	San Francisco	Bob Gaillard	West Coast	Regional Runner-up	UCLA	L 54–39
West	UCLA	John Wooden	Pacific-8	Champion	Memphis State	W 87–66
West	Weber State	Gene Visscher	Big Sky	First round	Long Beach State	L 88–75

== Bracket ==
* – Denotes overtime period

=== East region ===
Quarterfinals
Syracuse	83
Furman	82
Penn	62
St. John's	61
Providence	89
Saint Joseph's	76

Semifinals
Maryland	91
Syracuse	75
Penn	65
Providence	87

Finals
Maryland	89
Providence	103
East Regional third place
Syracuse	69
Penn	68

=== Mideast region ===
Quarterfinals
Marquette	77
Miami (OH)	62
Austin Peay	77
Jacksonville	75

Semifinals
Indiana	75
Marquette	69
Kentucky	106
Austin Peay	100*

Finals
Indiana	72
Kentucky	65
Mideast Regional third place
Marquette	88
Austin Peay	73

=== Midwest region ===
Quarterfinals
South Carolina	78
Texas Tech	70
Southwestern Louisiana	102
Houston	89

Semifinals
Memphis State	90
South Carolina	76
Kansas State	66
Southwestern Louisiana	63

Finals
Memphis State	92
Kansas State	72
Midwest Regional third place
South Carolina	90
Southwestern Louisiana	85

=== West region ===
Quarterfinals
Arizona State	103
Oklahoma City	78
Long Beach State	88
Weber State	75

Semifinals
UCLA	98
Arizona State	81
San Francisco	77
Long Beach State	67

Finals
UCLA	54
San Francisco	39
West Regional third place
Arizona State	80
Long Beach State	84

=== Final Four ===
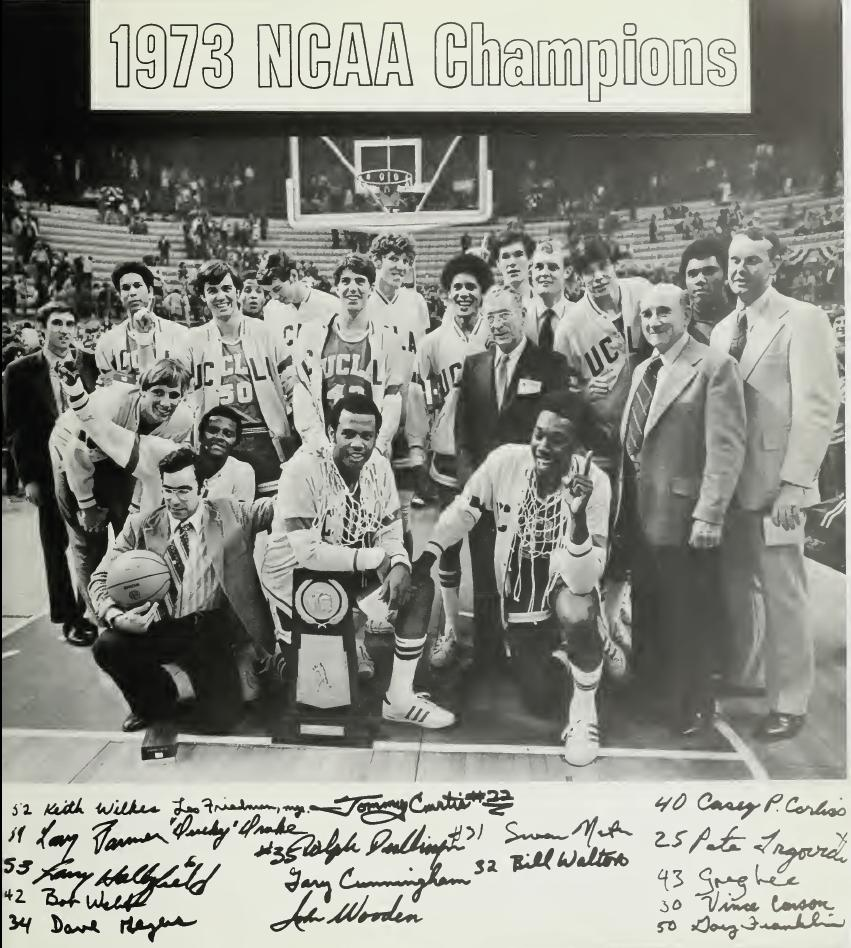
UCLA won its seventh consecutive championship and ninth in ten seasons

National Semifinals; Saturday, March 24
E	Providence	85
MW	Memphis State	98
ME	Indiana	59
W	UCLA	70

National Championship Game; Monday, March 26
MW	Memphis State	66
W	UCLA	87
National third-place game
ME	Indiana	97
E	Providence	79

== Aftermath ==
The 1973 NC State Wolfpack team averaged 93 points per game (ppg), led the nation in win margin (21.8 ppg), and posted a 27–0 record, but was ineligible for postseason play because of NCAA probation.

Gene Bartow, the Memphis State coach, would be John Wooden's successor at UCLA after the 1974–1975 season.

The tournament marked the last appearance of the Oklahoma City Chiefs, whose 11 tournament appearances are the most among teams no longer in Division I. The school would transition to the NAIA in 1985.

== Announcers ==
Curt Gowdy, Tom Hawkins, and Jim Simpson (Final Four only) - East Regional Final at Charlotte, North Carolina; Final Four at St. Louis, Missouri

- Jim Simpson and Tom Hawkins - First Round at Logan, Utah (Long Beach State-Weber State)
- Curt Gowdy and Bill Enis - First Round at Wichita, Kansas - (Louisiana-Houston)
- Jim Simpson and Bill Enis - Mideast Regional Final from Dayton, Ohio

== See also ==
- 1973 NCAA College Division basketball tournament
- 1973 National Invitation Tournament
- 1973 NAIA Division I men's basketball tournament
- 1973 National Women's Invitation Tournament
