= 1972–73 Georgetown Hoyas men's basketball team =

American college basketball season

1972–73 Georgetown Hoyas men's basketball
- Conference: Independent
- Record: 12–14
- Head coach: John Thompson (1st season)
- Assistant coaches: Bill Stein (1st season); George Leftwich (1st season)
- Captain: Game captains
- Home arena: McDonough Gymnasium

1972–73 NCAA University Division men's basketball independents standings
	Conf.				Overall
Team	W		L	PCT	W		L	PCT
No. 4 Providence		–		–	27	–	4	.871
No. 5 Marquette		–		–	27	–	4	.871
No. 13 Houston		–		–	23	–	4	.852
No. 14 Syracuse		–		–	24	–	5	.828
Virginia Tech		–		–	22	–	5	.815
Jacksonville		–		–	21	–	6	.778
Oklahoma City		–		–	21	–	6	.778
Oral Roberts		–		–	21	–	6	.778
South Carolina		–		–	22	–	7	.759
Marshall		–		–	20	–	7	.741
Northeastern		–		–	19	–	7	.731
St. John's		–		–	19	–	7	.731
Centenary		–		–	19	–	8	.704
Florida State		–		–	18	–	8	.692
Northern Illinois		–		–	17	–	8	.680
Duquesne		–		–	16	–	8	.667
Fairfield		–		–	18	–	9	.667
Cincinnati		–		–	17	–	9	.654
Denver		–		–	17	–	9	.654
George Washington		–		–	17	–	9	.654
Penn State		–		–	15	–	8	.652
Detroit		–		–	16	–	9	.640
Hardin–Simmons		–		–	16	–	9	.640
Indiana State		–		–	16	–	10	.615
Manhattan		–		–	16	–	10	.615
Utah State		–		–	16	–	10	.615
Notre Dame		–		–	18	–	12	.600
Air Force		–		–	14	–	10	.583
Creighton		–		–	15	–	11	.577
Hawaii		–		–	15	–	11	.577
Rutgers		–		–	15	–	11	.577
Stetson		–		–	15	–	11	.577
DePaul		–		–	14	–	11	.560
South Alabama		–		–	14	–	11	.560
Trinity (TX)		–		–	14	–	11	.560
Canisius		–		–	13	–	11	.542
Butler		–		–	14	–	12	.538
Charlotte		–		–	14	–	12	.538
Illinois State		–		–	13	–	12	.520
Long Island		–		–	13	–	12	.520
Navy		–		–	13	–	12	.520
Dayton		–		–	13	–	13	.500
Fairleigh Dickinson		–		–	13	–	13	.500
St. Bonaventure		–		–	13	–	13	.500
Portland State		–		–	12	–	12	.500
Georgetown		–		–	12	–	14	.462
Pittsburgh		–		–	12	–	14	.462
Tulane		–		–	12	–	14	.462
Army		–		–	11	–	13	.458
Boston College		–		–	11	–	14	.440
Colgate		–		–	11	–	14	.440
Villanova		–		–	11	–	14	.440
Fordham		–		–	12	–	16	.429
Southern Illinois		–		–	11	–	15	.423
West Virginia		–		–	10	–	15	.400
Cleveland State		–		–	9	–	14	.391
Ball State		–		–	9	–	15	.375
Niagara		–		–	9	–	16	.360
Loyola (IL)		–		–	8	–	15	.348
Holy Cross		–		–	9	–	17	.346
Southern Miss		–		–	8	–	16	.333
St. Francis (NY)		–		–	8	–	16	.333
Portland		–		–	9	–	19	.321
Seton Hall		–		–	8	–	17	.320
Georgia Southern		–		–	8	–	18	.308
Saint Peter's		–		–	8	–	18	.308
Georgia Tech		–		–	7	–	18	.280
Iona		–		–	6	–	16	.273
Samford		–		–	5	–	20	.200
Saint Francis (PA)		–		–	5	–	21	.192
Pan American		–		–	4	–	22	.154
Xavier		–		–	3	–	23	.115
Rankings from AP Poll

The 1972–73 Georgetown Hoyas men's basketball team represented Georgetown University during the 1972–73 NCAA University Division college basketball season. John Thompson, coached them in his first season as head coach. The team was an independent and played its home games at McDonough Gymnasium on the Georgetown campus in Washington, D.C. The Hoyas finished the season with a record of 12–14 – a significant improvement over the previous season's record – was not ranked in the Top 20 in the Associated Press Poll or Coaches' Poll at any time, and had no post-season play.

== John Thompson arrives ==
The 29-year-old Thompson was only the third African-American head coach in the history of NCAA Division basketball and was the first to take charge of a major college basketball program. He had been a star player for Washington, D.C.'s Archbishop Carroll High School and for Providence College, had played for two successful seasons with the Boston Celtics in the National Basketball Association, and then had returned to Washington, D.C., to coach St. Anthony's High School to a record of 122–28 in six seasons.

At Georgetown, Thompson inherited a team that had gone 3–23 the previous season, the culmination of a 25-year stretch of mostly undistinguished basketball at Georgetown. Although the team had appeared in the National Invitation Tournament in 1953 and 1970, between the 1947–48 season and the end of the previous season Georgetown had posted an overall record under .500 and its total of 296 wins during those 25 seasons was the lowest among the 32 Catholic universities playing Division I college basketball in the United States. The team also had had no NCAA tournament appearances since 1943.

Thompson's arrival heralded the school's rise to the status of a national basketball power; the 12–14 record this season was a significant improvement over the 3–23 finish of the previous year, and the 1972–73 squad was the last Georgetown men's basketball team to finish with a losing record until the 1998–99 season. Georgetown had hired Thompson in the hope that he could guide the Hoyas to an "occasional" National Invitation Tournament (NIT) appearance, but during his 26 1/2 seasons as head coach he would lead the Hoyas to 24 straight post-season tournaments – 19 NCAA tournaments and five NITs – from the 1974–75 to the 1997–98 seasons, and to the national championship in the 1983–84 season.

== Season recap ==
Thompson's first recruiting class consisted of five players. One of them was center Merlin Wilson, who had played for him at St. Anthony's and followed him to Georgetown to play college basketball. Wilson scored 24 points in the season opener against Saint Francis. At Loyola, the Hoyas outrebounded the Greyhounds 65–33, and Wilson pulled down 24 of Georgetown's rebounds. By mid-season, Wilson was averaging 12 points and 13 rebounds a game, a level of play unknown at Georgetown for many years, and was among the top ten college players in rebounds; a Tampa Tribune columnist wrote that the Hoyas were "a team destined to be one of the next great powers in college basketball" because of Wilson's talent. He scored 25 points and had 17 rebounds and eight blocks against Navy, had a 17-point, 17-rebound performance against Fordham in a big win, and had 15 points and 16 rebounds against St. Mary's in the last home game of the season. He finished the season as the team's leader in scoring and rebounds and was ranked 14th in the United States with 14.1 rebounds per game.

Another major Thompson recruit for his first season as a collegiate head coach was guard Jonathan Smith. Smith, like Wilson, had played for Thompson at St. Anthony's and followed him to Georgetown. Although some observers expected Smith to be a reserve, he quickly emerged as a major force for the Hoyas, scoring a career-high 25 points twice during the season, against Penn State and George Washington. Smith finished the season second on the team only to Wilson in scoring.

== Roster ==
1972–73 Georgetown Hoyas men's basketball team
Players
Coaches

Pos.	#	Name	Height	Weight	Year	Previous school	Hometown
G	40	Greg Brooks	6 ft 6 in (1.98 m)	—	Fr	St. Anthony's	Washington, D.C.
F	12	Tom Dooley	6 ft 5 in (1.96 m)	—	Jr	Rumson–Fair Haven	Rumson, NJ
F	54	Marc Edwards	6 ft 5 in (1.96 m)	—	Sr	DeMatha Catholic	Hyattsville, MD
G	12	Ed Fitzgerald	6 ft 2 in (1.88 m)	—	So	East Catholic	Manchester, CT
G	24	Vince Fletcher	6 ft 1 in (1.85 m)	—	Sr	Clinton	New York, NY
F	50	Mark Gallagher	6 ft 5 in (1.96 m)	—	So	Archbishop Molloy	Lynbrook, NY
G	22	Rick Kentz	6 ft 1 in (1.85 m)	—	Jr	Delbarton	Summit, NJ
G	10	Tim Lambour	5 ft 8 in (1.73 m)	—	Jr	Bishop Guilfoyle	Altoona, PA
G	42	Aaron Long	6 ft 2 in (1.88 m)	—	Fr	St. Anthony's	Washington, D.C.
F	14	Bill Lynn	6 ft 9 in (2.06 m)	185 lb (84 kg)	Fr	Spingarn	Washington, D.C.
C	32	Ron Lyons	6 ft 8 in (2.03 m)	—	Jr	Northwest College	Philadelphia, PA
G	30	Jonathan Smith	6 ft 1 in (1.85 m)	185 lb (84 kg)	Fr	St. Anthony's	Washington, D.C.
G	20	Mike Stokes	6 ft 2 in (1.88 m)	—	Fr	St. John's College	Washington, D.C.
G	34	Don Willis	6 ft 1 in (1.85 m)	—	Jr	DeMatha Catholic	Hyattsville, MD
C	44	Merlin Wilson	6 ft 9 in (2.06 m)	215 lb (98 kg)	Fr	St. Anthony's	Washington, D.C.

Head coach

- John Thompson

Assistant coach(es)

Legend

- (C) Team captain
- (S) Suspended
- (I) Ineligible
- (W) Walk-on
- Injured
- Current redshirt

Roster
Last update: 2016-Jan-30

== 1972–73 schedule and results ==
Date time, TV	Rank^{#}	Opponent^{#}	Result	Record	Site city, state
Regular Season
Mon., Nov. 27, 1972 no, no		Saint Francis	W 61–60	1-0	McDonough Gymnasium; Washington, DC
Wed., Nov. 29, 1972 no, no		at Rutgers	L 83–98	1-1	College Avenue Gymnasium; New Brunswick, NJ
Sat., Dec. 2, 1972 no, no		Wheeling Jesuit	W 58–46	2-1	McDonough Gymnasium; Washington, DC
Wed., Dec. 6, 1972 no, no		St. Bonaventure	W 73–70 ^{OT}	3-1	McDonough Gymnasium; Washington, DC
Sat., Dec. 9, 1972 no, no		at St. John's	L 68–109	3-2	Alumni Hall; Queens, NY
Tue., Dec. 12, 1972 no, no		No. 2 Maryland	L 73–99	3-3	McDonough Gymnasium; Washington, DC
Wed., Dec. 27, 1972 no, no		vs. Virginia; St. Louis Invitational Tournament	L 58–72	3-4	Kiel Auditorium; St. Louis, MO
Fri., Dec. 29, 1972 no, no		vs. Army; St. Louis Invitational Tournament	W 74–70	4-4	Kiel Auditorium; St. Louis, MO
Sat., Jan. 6, 1973 no, no		at South Florida	L 66–70	4-5	Curtis Hixon Hall; Tampa, FL
Mon., Jan. 8, 1973 no, no		at No. 19 Florida State	L 70–101	4-6	Tully Gymnasium; Tallahassee, FL
Sat., Jan. 13, 1973 no, no		at Connecticut; Rivalry	L 64–78	4-7	University of Connecticut Field House; Storrs, CT
Wed., Jan. 17, 1973 no, no		Randolph–Macon	W 57–56	5-7	McDonough Gymnasium; Washington, DC
Sat., Jan. 20, 1973 no, no		at Holy Cross	L 100–116	5-8	Worcester Memorial Auditorium; Worcester, MA
Wed., Jan. 24, 1973 no, no		St. Joseph's	L 59–70	5-9	McDonough Gymnasium; Washington, DC
Sat., Jan. 27, 1973 no, no		Seton Hall	W 80–62	6-9	McDonough Gymnasium; Washington, DC
Wed., Jan. 31, 1973 no, no		at Loyola Maryland	W 74–59	7-9	Alumni Gymnasium; Baltimore, MD
Sat., Feb. 3, 1973 no, no		at Penn State	L 64–74	7-10	Recreation Hall; State College, PA
Wed., Feb. 7, 1973 no, no		Roanoke	L 57–73	7-11	McDonough Gymnasium; Washington, DC
Sat., Feb. 10, 1973 no, no		at Dickinson	W 66–65	8-11	Alumni Gymnasium; Carlisle, PA
Wed., Feb. 14, 1973 no, no		Navy	W 55–52	9-11	McDonough Gymnasium; Washington, DC
Sat., Feb. 17, 1973 no, no		Boston College	W 56–55	10-11	McDonough Gymnasium; Washington, DC
Wed., Feb. 21, 1973 no, no		Fordham	W 77–71	11-11	McDonough Gymnasium; Washington, DC
Sat., Feb. 24, 1973 no, no		at American	L 68–90	11-12	Fort Myer Gymnasium; Fort Myer, VA
Tue., Feb. 27, 1973 no, no		at George Washington	L 78–91	11-13	Fort Myer Gymnasium; Fort Myer, VA
Thu., Mar. 1, 1973 no, no		St. Mary's of Maryland	W 54–43	12-13	McDonough Gymnasium; Washington, DC
Sat., Mar. 3, 1973 no, no		Manhattan	L 64–71	12-14	McDonough Gymnasium; Washington, DC
*Non-conference game. ^{#}Rankings from AP Poll. (#) Tournament seedings in parentheses.
