= 1972–73 Marshall Thundering Herd men's basketball team =

American college basketball season

1972–73 Marshall Thundering Herd men's basketball

NIT, First Round
- Conference: Independent
- Record: 20–7
- Head coach: Bob Daniels (1st season)
- Associate head coach: Stewart Way
- Assistant coach: Bill Robinette
- Home arena: Veterans Memorial Fieldhouse

1972–73 NCAA University Division men's basketball independents standings
	Conf.				Overall
Team	W		L	PCT	W		L	PCT
No. 4 Providence		–		–	27	–	4	.871
No. 5 Marquette		–		–	27	–	4	.871
No. 13 Houston		–		–	23	–	4	.852
No. 14 Syracuse		–		–	24	–	5	.828
Virginia Tech		–		–	22	–	5	.815
Jacksonville		–		–	21	–	6	.778
Oklahoma City		–		–	21	–	6	.778
Oral Roberts		–		–	21	–	6	.778
South Carolina		–		–	22	–	7	.759
Marshall		–		–	20	–	7	.741
Northeastern		–		–	19	–	7	.731
St. John's		–		–	19	–	7	.731
Centenary		–		–	19	–	8	.704
Florida State		–		–	18	–	8	.692
Northern Illinois		–		–	17	–	8	.680
Duquesne		–		–	16	–	8	.667
Fairfield		–		–	18	–	9	.667
Cincinnati		–		–	17	–	9	.654
Denver		–		–	17	–	9	.654
George Washington		–		–	17	–	9	.654
Penn State		–		–	15	–	8	.652
Detroit		–		–	16	–	9	.640
Hardin–Simmons		–		–	16	–	9	.640
Indiana State		–		–	16	–	10	.615
Manhattan		–		–	16	–	10	.615
Utah State		–		–	16	–	10	.615
Notre Dame		–		–	18	–	12	.600
Air Force		–		–	14	–	10	.583
Creighton		–		–	15	–	11	.577
Hawaii		–		–	15	–	11	.577
Rutgers		–		–	15	–	11	.577
Stetson		–		–	15	–	11	.577
DePaul		–		–	14	–	11	.560
South Alabama		–		–	14	–	11	.560
Trinity (TX)		–		–	14	–	11	.560
Canisius		–		–	13	–	11	.542
Butler		–		–	14	–	12	.538
Charlotte		–		–	14	–	12	.538
Illinois State		–		–	13	–	12	.520
Long Island		–		–	13	–	12	.520
Navy		–		–	13	–	12	.520
Dayton		–		–	13	–	13	.500
Fairleigh Dickinson		–		–	13	–	13	.500
St. Bonaventure		–		–	13	–	13	.500
Portland State		–		–	12	–	12	.500
Georgetown		–		–	12	–	14	.462
Pittsburgh		–		–	12	–	14	.462
Tulane		–		–	12	–	14	.462
Army		–		–	11	–	13	.458
Boston College		–		–	11	–	14	.440
Colgate		–		–	11	–	14	.440
Villanova		–		–	11	–	14	.440
Fordham		–		–	12	–	16	.429
Southern Illinois		–		–	11	–	15	.423
West Virginia		–		–	10	–	15	.400
Cleveland State		–		–	9	–	14	.391
Ball State		–		–	9	–	15	.375
Niagara		–		–	9	–	16	.360
Loyola (IL)		–		–	8	–	15	.348
Holy Cross		–		–	9	–	17	.346
Southern Miss		–		–	8	–	16	.333
St. Francis (NY)		–		–	8	–	16	.333
Portland		–		–	9	–	19	.321
Seton Hall		–		–	8	–	17	.320
Georgia Southern		–		–	8	–	18	.308
Saint Peter's		–		–	8	–	18	.308
Georgia Tech		–		–	7	–	18	.280
Iona		–		–	6	–	16	.273
Samford		–		–	5	–	20	.200
Saint Francis (PA)		–		–	5	–	21	.192
Pan American		–		–	4	–	22	.154
Xavier		–		–	3	–	23	.115
Rankings from AP Poll

The 1972–73 Marshall Thundering Herd men's basketball team represented Marshall University during the 1972–73 NCAA University Division men's basketball season. The Thundering Herd, led by first-year head coach Bob Daniels, played their home games at the Veterans Memorial Fieldhouse as an independent. They finished the season 20–7 and received a bid to the NIT where they lost to Fairfield in the First Round.

== Roster ==
1972–73 Marshall Thundering Herd men's basketball team
Players
Coaches

Pos.	#	Name	Height	Weight	Year	Hometown
G	10	Mike D'Antoni	6 ft 3 in (1.91 m)	190 lb (86 kg)	Sr	Mullens, West Virginia
G	14	Greg Imperi	6 ft 2 in (1.88 m)	175 lb (79 kg)	Jr	Huntington, West Virginia
G	23	Billy James	6 ft 4 in (1.93 m)	195 lb (88 kg)	Sr	Scottsburg, Indiana
G	24	Tyrone Collins	6 ft 3 in (1.91 m)	200 lb (91 kg)	Sr	Patterson, New York
F	34	Lyle Monroe	6 ft 8 in (2.03 m)	205 lb (93 kg)	Jr	Fort Recovery, Ohio
F	35	Joe Wilmer	6 ft 5 in (1.96 m)	195 lb (88 kg)	Jr	Ronceverte, West Virginia
G	41	Joe Hickman	6 ft 0 in (1.83 m)	160 lb (73 kg)	Fr	Woodstown, New Jersey
G	42	Eric Bachelor	6 ft 3 in (1.91 m)	190 lb (86 kg)	So	Eminence, Kentucky
F	43	Dave Mastropaolo	6 ft 6 in (1.98 m)	195 lb (88 kg)	So	Falls Church, Virginia
F	45	Randy Noll	6 ft 8 in (2.03 m)	215 lb (98 kg)	Sr	Covington, Kentucky
C	51	Chuck Jackson	6 ft 7 in (2.01 m)	200 lb (91 kg)	So	El Paso, Texas
C	52	Andy Frederiksen	6 ft 10 in (2.08 m)	215 lb (98 kg)	Jr	St. Thomas, Virgin Islands
F	53	Bill Mannefeld	6 ft 6 in (1.98 m)	195 lb (88 kg)	Fr	Plano, Texas
C	55	Wayne Smith	6 ft 8 in (2.03 m)	220 lb (100 kg)	Jr	Milwaukee, Wisconsin

Head coach

- Bob Daniels

Assistant coach(es)

- Stewart Way
- Bill Robinette

Legend

- (C) Team captain
- (S) Suspended
- (I) Ineligible
- (W) Walk-on
- Injured
- Current redshirt

== Schedule and results ==
Date time, TV	Rank^{#}	Opponent^{#}	Result	Record	Site city, state
Regular Season
Dec 2, 1972		Morris Harvey	W 85–70	1–0	Veterans Memorial Fieldhouse; Huntington, WV
Dec 5, 1972		UNC Charlotte	W 74–59	2–0	Veterans Memorial Fieldhouse; Huntington, WV
Dec 8, 1972		vs. UTEP; Bayou Classic	W 64–62	3–0	Blackham Coliseum; Lafayette, LA
Dec 9, 1972		at No. 10 Southwestern Louisiana; Bayou Classic	L 84–98	3–1	Blackham Coliseum; Lafayette, LA
Dec 12, 1972		at Cleveland State	W 79–72	4–1	Public Hall; Cleveland, OH
Dec 15, 1972		Baylor; Marshall Memorial Invitational	W 82–72	5–1	Veterans Memorial Fieldhouse; Huntington, WV
Dec 16, 1972		Princeton; Marshall Memorial Invitational	W 78–64	6–1	Veterans Memorial Fieldhouse; Huntington, WV
Dec 22, 1972		Morehead State	W 74–71	7–1	Veterans Memorial Fieldhouse; Huntington, WV
Dec 30, 1972		at Western Michigan	L 70–72 ^{2OT}	7–2	Read Fieldhouse; Kalamazoo, MI
Jan 3, 1973		Oral Roberts	L 76–81	7–3	Veterans Memorial Fieldhouse; Huntington, WV
Jan 6, 1973		Eastern Kentucky	W 83–72	8–3	Veterans Memorial Fieldhouse; Huntington, WV
Jan 10, 1973		at Bowling Green	L 87–92	8–4	Anderson Arena; Bowling Green, OH
Jan 13, 1973		Central Michigan	W 99–91	9–4	Veterans Memorial Fieldhouse; Huntington, WV
Jan 17, 1973		Miami (OH)	W 90–70	10–4	Veterans Memorial Fieldhouse; Huntington, WV
Jan 20, 1973		at Morris Harvey	W 95–72	11–4	Charleston Civic Center; Charleston, WV
Jan 24, 1973		at Morehead State	L 80–81	11–5	Wetherby Gymnasium; Morehead, KY
Jan 29, 1973		North Carolina A&T	W 85–66	12–5	Veterans Memorial Fieldhouse; Huntington, WV
Jan 31, 1973		at South Carolina	L 71–88	12–6	Carolina Coliseum; Columbia, SC
Feb 3, 1973		at Eastern Kentucky	W 100–76	13–6	Alumni Coliseum; Richmond, KY
Feb 7, 1973		at Miami (OH)	W 68–59	14–6	Millett Hall; Oxford, OH
Feb 10, 1973		at No. 19 Oral Roberts	W 106–103 ^{OT}	15–6	Mabee Center; Tulsa, OK
Feb 17, 1973		Saint Francis (PA)	W 116–79	16–6	Veterans Memorial Fieldhouse; Huntington, WV
Feb 22, 1973		at UNC Charlotte	W 69–65	17–6	Belk Gymnasium; Charlotte, NC
Feb 24, 1973		at Stetson	W 86–67	18–6	DeLand National Guard Armory; DeLand, FL
Feb 26, 1973		at Florida State	W 71–59	19–6	Tully Gymnasium; Tallahassee, FL
Mar 1, 1973		Samford	W 77–65	20–6	Veterans Memorial Fieldhouse; Huntington, WV
NIT
Mar 18, 1973		vs. Fairfield; First Round	L 76–80	20–7	Madison Square Garden; New York, NY
*Non-conference game. ^{#}Rankings from AP Poll. (#) Tournament seedings in parentheses.
