= Brandon Wallace =

American basketball player (born 1985)

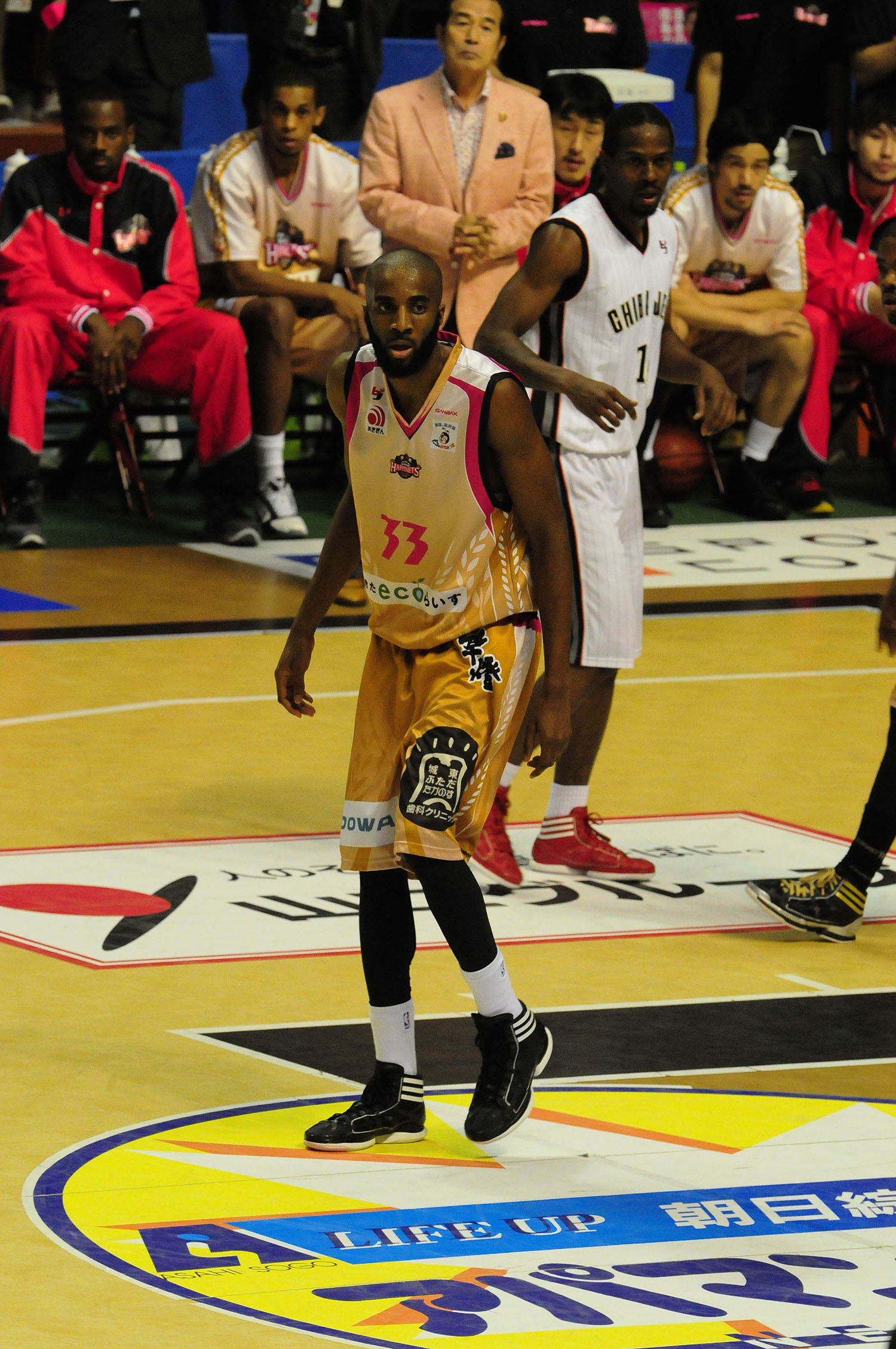
- Wallace at Akita Municipal Gymnasium

Personal information
- Born: March 14, 1985 (age 41) Statesboro, Georgia, U.S.
- Listed height: 6 ft 8 in (2.03 m)
- Listed weight: 225 lb (102 kg)

Career information
- High school: Silver Bluff (Aiken, South Carolina)
- College: South Carolina (2003–2007)
- NBA draft: 2007: undrafted
- Playing career: 2007–2013
- Position: Small forward / power forward

Career history
- 2007: Utah Flash
- 2008: Iowa Energy
- 2008: Los Angeles D-Fenders
- 2008: Mersin Büyükşehir Belediyesi
- 2008–2009: Basket Kwidzyn
- 2009: Hapoel Holon
- 2009–2010: Turów Zgorzelec
- 2010–2011: Bakersfield Jam
- 2011: Akita Northern Happinets
- 2011–2012: Bakersfield Jam
- 2012: Toros de Aragua
- 2012–2013: Fort Wayne Mad Ants

Career highlights
- South Carolina Mr. Basketball (2003)
- Stats at Basketball Reference

Brandon Travares Wallace (born March 14, 1985) is an American professional basketball player.

== High school ==
Born in Statesboro, Georgia, Wallace spent his high school years at Silver Bluff, where he averaged 21.9 points, 15.7 rebounds, 4.5 assists, and 4.3 blocks per game during his senior season. He led his team to a 24–7 record that year, culminating in an exciting state championship game, where he hit the game-winning shot at the final second. It was the first state title in Silver Bluff history. Wallace was rewarded with Player of the Year Honors by the Augusta Chronicle and also made the McDonald's All-American team. Other high school honors bestowed upon Wallace include the Region Five Class AA Player of the Year (2001 and 2002) and Best Defensive Player. Wallace was recruited by Maryland, Auburn, and the University of South Carolina. He chose the latter.

=== Prep/High School Awards & Honors ===
- South Carolina Gatorade Player of the Year – 2003
- South Carolina Mr. Basketball – 2003

== College career ==
At the University of South Carolina, Wallace steadily improved his game. Freshman year, he merely averaged 3.7 ppg, 3.3 rpg, 1.0 bpg and 0.6 spg. Sophomore year, he averaged 5.7 ppg, 4.5 rpg, 0.9 apg, 1.0 spg, and 1.7 bpg. He led the team in blocks (55) and slam dunks (30.) Junior year, he averaged 7.6 ppg, 6.1 rpg, 2.3 apg, 1.9 bpg and 0.8 spg. As a senior year, he posted a stat line of 9.9 ppg, 9.4 rpg, 1.9 apg, 1.3 spg and 2.9 bpg. Wallace set the school record for blocked shots (249), good for ninth all-time in the SEC. He also ranks fifth in SEC history in blocks per game and sixth in rebounds.

=== College statistics ===
Year	Team	GP	GS	MPG	FG%	3P%	FT%	RPG	APG	SPG	BPG	PPG
2003–04	South Carolina	34	4	13.4	.397	.263	.583	3.32	0.79	0.56	1.03	3.68
2004–05	South Carolina	33	21	23.3	.433	.176	.600	4.52	0.94	1.00	1.67	5.67
2005–06	South Carolina	38	35	30.2	.500	.239	.556	5.89	2.29	0.79	1.79	7.63
2006–07	South Carolina	30	30	36.5	.470	.220	.527	9.40	1.93	1.27	2.73	9.90
Career		135	90	25.7	.460	.223	.558	5.69	1.50	0.89	1.78	6.66

== Professional career ==
Despite a successful four year collegiate career, Wallace was not selected in the 2007 NBA draft. Nevertheless, he was invited to play for the Boston Celtics Las Vegas Summer League team. After just one Summer League game, the Boston Celtics signed the former high school standout to a 2-year partially guaranteed contract. Wallace played small forward for the Celtics, and earned a roster spot on the 2007–08 Celtics roster after competing with Dahntay Jones and Jackie Manuel who were both waived. On December 18, 2007, however, he was waived by the Celtics before appearing in a game. He was selected in the second round of the NBA D League draft by the Bakersfield Jam.

== European career ==
On August 4, 2008, it was reported that Wallace had signed with a Turkish team.

After being released, Brandon continued the season in Poland (Kwidzyn) averaging 7.8 ppg and 5.6 rpg. Brandon was also selected to the All-Star team.

On October 23, 2009, Brandon Wallace signed with Israeli state cup holder (and 2008 champion) Hapoel Holon.

== Personal life ==
Wallace has two sons, one born in November 2007 and the other born July 2011

== Career statistics ==
Legend
GP	Games played	GS	Games started	MPG	Minutes per game
FG%	Field goal percentage	3P%	3-point field goal percentage	FT%	Free throw percentage
RPG	Rebounds per game	APG	Assists per game	SPG	Steals per game
BPG	Blocks per game	PPG	Points per game	**Bold**	Career high

== NBA Summer League Stats ==
Year	Team	GP	GS	MPG	FG%	3P%	FT%	RPG	APG	SPG	BPG	PPG
2008–09	CHA	5	2	13.2	.350	1.000	1.000	1.80	0.80	0.20	0.20	3.60
2009–10	WAS	4	1	12.7	.500	.000	.400	1.75	0.25	0.50	0.00	3.50
Career		9	3	13.0	.406	.500	.625	1.78	0.56	0.33	0.11	3.56

=== Regular season ===
Year	Team	GP	GS	MPG	FG%	3P%	FT%	RPG	APG	SPG	BPG	PPG
2007–08	SBL/UTA/IWA	31	18	30.2	.447	.167	.627	6.61	2.68	1.13	2.13	8.35
2008–09	Kwidzyn	13		19.0	.567	.333	.679	5.8	1.3	1.0	1.2	7.7
2009–10	Holon	6		22.5	.438	.250	.500	7.5	1.0	1.7	1.7	5.8
2009–10	Zgorzelec	3	0	19.3	.600	.600	.500	4.33	0.67	1.00	1.00	6.00
2010–11	BAK	39	22	26.1	.460	.360	.586	6.79	2.18	0.92	1.49	9.87
2011–12	Akita	6	6	14.7	.441	.000	.583	4.3	0.3	0.3	1.2	6.2
2011–12	BAK	6	3	19.9	.312	.222	.333	3.83	1.33	0.67	0.67	4.00
2011–12	Apollon/Toros	6	2	21.9	.500	.143	.900	6.50	0.67	1.33	1.33	9.67
2012–13	FWN	44	19	24.0	.440	.362	.595	6.36	1.23	0.66	1.41	7.95

=== Playoffs ===
Year	Team	GP	GS	MPG	FG%	3P%	FT%	RPG	APG	SPG	BPG	PPG
2007–08	SBL	2	2	36.9	.440	.333	.500	13.50	1.50	0.50	3.00	12.00
2009–10	Turow	6		25.7	.326	.200	.700	7.2	1.2	1.2	0.2	6.8
2010–11	BAK	3	0	21.1	.263	.000	.167	5.67	0.67	0.67	0.00	3.67
2012–13	BAK	2	2	36.7	.474	.333	.500	8.50	1.50	0.50	1.00	10.50
