= 1973–74 South Carolina Gamecocks men's basketball team =

American college basketball season

1973–74 South Carolina Gamecocks men's basketball

NCAA Tournament, First Round
- Conference: Independent

Ranking
- Coaches: No. 16
- AP: No. 19
- Record: 22–5
- Head coach: Frank McGuire (10th season)
- Home arena: Carolina Coliseum

1973–74 NCAA Division I men's basketball independents standings
| | Conf. | | | | Overall |
| Team | W | | L | PCT | W | | L | PCT |
|---|---|---|---|---|---|---|---|---|
| No. 5 Notre Dame | | – | | – | 26 | – | 3 | .897 |
| No. 8 Providence | | – | | – | 28 | – | 4 | .875 |
| No. 16 Pittsburgh | | – | | – | 25 | – | 4 | .862 |
| UNC Charlotte | | – | | – | 22 | – | 4 | .846 |
| Centenary | | – | | – | 21 | – | 4 | .840 |
| Marquette | | – | | – | 26 | – | 5 | .839 |
| No. 19 South Carolina | | – | | – | 22 | – | 5 | .815 |
| No. 18 Oral Roberts | | – | | – | 23 | – | 6 | .793 |
| South Alabama | | – | | – | 22 | – | 6 | .786 |
| Creighton | | – | | – | 23 | – | 7 | .767 |
| St. John's | | – | | – | 20 | – | 7 | .741 |
| Georgia Southern | | – | | – | 19 | – | 7 | .731 |
| Southern Illinois | | – | | – | 19 | – | 7 | .731 |
| Syracuse | | – | | – | 19 | – | 7 | .731 |
| VCU | | – | | – | 17 | – | 7 | .708 |
| Cincinnati | | – | | – | 19 | – | 8 | .704 |
| Boston College | | – | | – | 21 | – | 9 | .700 |
| Florida State | | – | | – | 18 | – | 8 | .692 |
| Rutgers | | – | | – | 18 | – | 8 | .692 |
| No. 20 Dayton | | – | | – | 20 | – | 9 | .690 |
| Hawaii | | – | | – | 19 | – | 9 | .679 |
| Jacksonville | | – | | – | 20 | – | 10 | .667 |
| Manhattan | | – | | – | 18 | – | 9 | .667 |
| Mercer | | – | | – | 16 | – | 8 | .667 |
| Detroit | | – | | – | 17 | – | 9 | .654 |
| Fairfield | | – | | – | 17 | – | 9 | .654 |
| Houston | | – | | – | 17 | – | 9 | .654 |
| Illinois State | | – | | – | 17 | – | 9 | .654 |
| Marshall | | – | | – | 17 | – | 9 | .654 |
| St. Bonaventure | | – | | – | 17 | – | 9 | .654 |
| Stetson | | – | | – | 17 | – | 9 | .654 |
| DePaul | | – | | – | 16 | – | 9 | .640 |
| Memphis State | | – | | – | 19 | – | 11 | .633 |
| Northeast Louisiana | | – | | – | 16 | – | 10 | .615 |
| Utah State | | – | | – | 16 | – | 10 | .615 |
| Colgate | | – | | – | 15 | – | 10 | .600 |
| Portland State | | – | | – | 16 | – | 11 | .593 |
| Seton Hall | | – | | – | 16 | – | 11 | .593 |
| Pan American | | – | | – | 13 | – | 9 | .591 |
| George Washington | | – | | – | 15 | – | 11 | .577 |
| Portland | | – | | – | 15 | – | 11 | .577 |
| Saint Francis (PA) | | – | | – | 15 | – | 11 | .577 |
| Ball State | | – | | – | 14 | – | 12 | .538 |
| Butler | | – | | – | 14 | – | 12 | .538 |
| Canisius | | – | | – | 14 | – | 12 | .538 |
| Milwaukee | | – | | – | 14 | – | 12 | .538 |
| Penn State | | – | | – | 14 | – | 12 | .538 |
| Northeastern | | – | | – | 12 | – | 11 | .522 |
| Long Island | | – | | – | 13 | – | 12 | .520 |
| Duquesne | | – | | – | 12 | – | 12 | .500 |
| Georgetown | | – | | – | 13 | – | 13 | .500 |
| Oklahoma City | | – | | – | 13 | – | 13 | .500 |
| Virginia Tech | | – | | – | 13 | – | 13 | .500 |
| Indiana State | | – | | – | 12 | – | 14 | .462 |
| Loyola Chicago | | – | | – | 12 | – | 14 | .462 |
| Niagara | | – | | – | 12 | – | 14 | .462 |
| Tulane | | – | | – | 12 | – | 14 | .462 |
| Air Force | | – | | – | 11 | – | 13 | .458 |
| Iona | | – | | – | 11 | – | 13 | .458 |
| St. Francis (NY) | | – | | – | 11 | – | 13 | .458 |
| Fairleigh Dickinson | | – | | – | 11 | – | 14 | .440 |
| Hardin-Simmons | | – | | – | 11 | – | 14 | .440 |
| South Florida | | – | | – | 11 | – | 14 | .440 |
| Denver | | – | | – | 11 | – | 15 | .423 |
| Southern Mississippi | | – | | – | 11 | – | 15 | .423 |
| Navy | | – | | – | 9 | – | 13 | .409 |
| West Virginia | | – | | – | 10 | – | 15 | .400 |
| Fordham | | – | | – | 8 | – | 17 | .320 |
| Northern Illinois | | – | | – | 8 | – | 17 | .320 |
| Eastern Michigan | | – | | – | 8 | – | 18 | .308 |
| Holy Cross | | – | | – | 8 | – | 18 | .308 |
| Saint Peter's | | – | | – | 8 | – | 18 | .308 |
| Xavier | | – | | – | 8 | – | 18 | .308 |
| Villanova | | – | | – | 7 | – | 19 | .269 |
| Army | | – | | – | 6 | – | 18 | .250 |
| Houston Baptist | | – | | – | 6 | – | 19 | .240 |
| Cleveland State | | – | | – | 6 | – | 20 | .231 |
| Samford | | – | | – | 6 | – | 20 | .231 |
| Buffalo | | – | | – | 5 | – | 20 | .200 |
| Georgia Tech | | – | | – | 5 | – | 21 | .192 |
| Georgia State | | – | | – | 1 | – | 25 | .038 |
Rankings from AP Poll

The 1973–74 South Carolina Gamecocks men's basketball team represented the University of South Carolina during the 1973–74 men's college basketball season.

This is Frank McGuire's 10th season as a head coach. They finished the record of 22-5.

== Roster ==
1973–74 South Carolina Gamecocks men's basketball team
Players
Coaches

| Pos. | # | Name | Height | Weight | Year | Hometown |
|---|---|---|---|---|---|---|
| G | 10 | Mike Dunleavy Sr. | 6 ft 2 in (1.88 m) | 175 lb (79 kg) | So | Brooklyn, New York |
| F | 22 | Alex English | 6 ft 8 in (2.03 m) | 185 lb (84 kg) | So | Columbia, South Carolina |
| G | 32 | Brian Winters | 6 ft 4 in (1.93 m) | 185 lb (84 kg) | Sr | Rockaway, New York |

Head coach

- Frank McGuire

Assistant coach(es)

Legend

- (C) Team captain
- (S) Suspended
- (I) Ineligible
- (W) Walk-on
- Injured
- Current redshirt

== Schedule ==
| Date time, TV | Rank^{#} | Opponent^{#} | Result | Record | Site city, state |
|---|---|---|---|---|---|
| December 1 | | Toledo | W 74–54 | 1–0 | Carolina Coliseum; Columbia, SC |
| December 5 | | Georgia Southern | W 91–78 | 2–0 | Carolina Coliseum; Columbia, SC |
| December 8 | | at Michigan State | W 74–63 | 3–0 | Jenison Fieldhouse; East Lansing, Michigan |
| December 12 | | DePauw | W 104–55 | 4–0 | Carolina Coliseum; Columbia, SC |
| December 22 | | at Indiana | L 71–84 | 4–1 | Assembly Hall; Bloomington, Indiana |
| December 27 | | vs. Alabama | L 75–77 | 4–2 | |
| December 28 | | vs. Eastern Kentucky | W 73–58 | 5–2 | |
| January 2 | | Texas Tech | W 81–65 | 6–2 | Carolina Coliseum; Columbia, SC |
| January 5 | | Marquette | W 60–58 | 7–2 | Carolina Coliseum; Columbia, SC |
| January 9 | | Lafayette | W 84–63 | 8–2 | Carolina Coliseum; Columbia, SC |
| January 12 | | Manhattan | W 75–61 | 9–2 | Carolina Coliseum; Columbia, SC |
| January 16 | | vs. Davidson | L 59–70 | 9–3 | Charlotte Coliseum; Charlotte, NC |
| January 19 | | Penn | W 67–57 | 10–3 | Carolina Coliseum; Columbia, SC |
| January 24 | | at Fordham | W 79–63 | 11–3 | Madison Square Garden; New York, NY |
| January 26 | | vs. Seton Hall | W 75–74 | 12–3 | Madison Square Garden; New York, NY |
| January 30 | | Niagara | W 85–60 | 13–3 | Carolina Coliseum; Columbia, SC |
| February 4 | | Canisius | W 76–58 | 14–3 | Carolina Coliseum; Columbia, SC |
| February 6 | | at Villanova | W 63–47 | 15–3 | Villanova Field House; Delaware County, Pennsylvania |
| February 9 | No. 13 | Dayton | W 81–68 | 16–3 | Carolina Coliseum (11,983); Columbia, SC |
| February 13 | | at Georgia Tech | W 82–73 | 17–3 | Alexander Memorial Coliseum; Atlanta, Georgia |
| February 16 | | Notre Dame | L 68–72 | 17–4 | Carolina Coliseum; Columbia, SC |
| February 20 | | Virginia Tech | W 82–71 | 18–4 | Carolina Coliseum; Columbia, SC |
| February 24 | | at Duquesne | W 67–57 | 19–4 | Civic Arena; Pittsburgh, Pennsylvania |
| February 27 | | Pittsburgh | W 67–50 | 20–4 | Carolina Coliseum; Columbia, SC |
| March 2 | | at Houston | W 104–86 | 21–4 | Hofheinz Pavilion; Houston, Texas |
| March 5 | | at Creighton | W 78–69 | 22–4 | Omaha Civic Auditorium; Omaha, Nebraska |
| March 9 | | vs. Furman; NCAA Tournament • First Round | L 69–75 | 22–5 | Palestra; Philadelphia, Pennsylvania |
*Non-conference game. ^{#}Rankings from AP Poll. (#) Tournament seedings in parentheses.

== Team players drafted into the NBA ==
| Round | Pick | Player | NBA club |
|---|---|---|---|
| 1 | 12 | Brian Winters | Los Angeles Lakers |
