= Bob Daniels (basketball) =

American basketball player and coach (1935–2022)

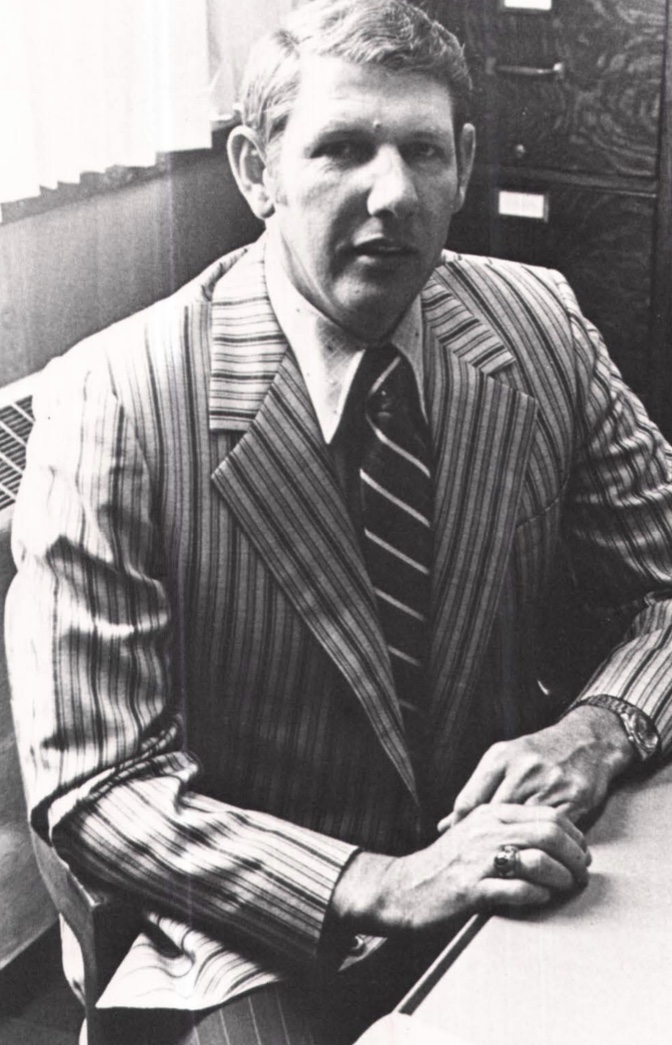

Biographical details
- Born: July 20, 1935; Tutor Key, Kentucky, U.S.
- Died: March 18, 2022 (aged 86); Versailles, Kentucky, U.S.

Playing career

Basketball
- 1953–1957: Western Kentucky

Baseball
- 1954–1957: Western Kentucky
- Positions: Forward, Pitcher

Coaching career (HC unless noted)
- 1957–1960: Sacramento (KY) HS
- 1960–1964: Muhlenberg (KY) HS
- 1964–1967: Kentucky Wesleyan (assistant)
- 1967–1972: Kentucky Wesleyan
- 1972–1977: Marshall

Head coaching record
- Overall: 181–98 (college)

Accomplishments and honors

Championships
- NCAA Division II Tournament (1968, 1969)

Awards
- NABC Division II Coach of the Year (1971)

Robert Eugene Daniels (July 20, 1935 – March 18, 2022) was an American basketball player and coach.

== Career ==
Collegiately he played basketball and baseball for Western Kentucky University under Hall of Fame coach Edgar Diddle. In 1957 he was drafted by the Cincinnati Royals. He started assistant coaching under Coach Guy R. Strong at Kentucky Wesleyan College and was a part of the 1965–66 National Championship team, the first of Kentucky Wesleyan's eight National Championships. During the late 1960s and early-1970s he coached the Kentucky Wesleyan Panthers for five seasons, all five seasons he took the team to the Division II NCAA Tournament and won the second and third National Championship for the college. After Kentucky Wesleyan he was the Thundering Herd coach beginning in the 1972–73 season for the NIT appearance.

Daniels died in Versailles, Kentucky, on March 18, 2022, at the age of 86.

== Head coaching record ==
Record table
Season	Team	Overall	Conference	Standing	Postseason
Kentucky Wesleyan Panthers (Independent) (1967–1972)
1967–68	Kentucky Wesleyan	28–3			NCAA Div II Champion
1968–69	Kentucky Wesleyan	25–5			NCAA Div II Champion
1969–70	Kentucky Wesleyan	18–10			NCAA Div II Sweet 16
1970–71	Kentucky Wesleyan	22–8			NCAA Div II Fourth Place
1971–72	Kentucky Wesleyan	17–10			NCAA Div II Round of 32
Kentucky Wesleyan:		110–36			
Marshall Thundering Herd (Independent) (1972–1976)
1972–73	Marshall	20–7			NIT First Round
1973–74	Marshall	17–9			
1974–75	Marshall	13–13			
1975–76	Marshall	13–14			
Marshall Thundering Herd (Southern) (1976–1977)
1976–77	Marshall	8–19	2–1	8th	
Marshall:		71–62			
Total:		181–98			
National champion Postseason invitational champion Conference regular season champion Conference regular season and conference tournament champion Division regular season champion Division regular season and conference tournament champion Conference tournament champion
