= 1973 NAIA basketball tournament =

College basketball tournament

1973 NAIA men's basketball tournament
- Teams: 32
- Finals site: Municipal Auditorium, Kansas City, Missouri
- Champions: Guilford (1 title, 1 title game)
- Runner-up: Maryland Eastern Shore (2 title game)
- Semifinalists: Augustana (IL) (1 Final Four); Slippery Rock (1 Final Four)
- Charles Stevenson Hustle Award: David Hudson (Slippery Rock)
- MVP: Lloyd Free (Guilford)

The 1973 NAIA men's basketball tournament was held in March at Municipal Auditorium in Kansas City, Missouri. The 36th annual NAIA basketball tournament featured 32 teams playing in a single-elimination format. Valdosta State ended (3) Kentucky State's run to get 4 championship in a row by upsetting (3) Kentucky State in the first round by 9.

== Awards and honors ==
- Leading scorer:
- Leading rebounder:
- Player of the Year: est. 1994

== 1973 NAIA bracket ==
First round	Second round
1	Sam Houston State (Tex.)	88
-	Wartburg (Iowa)	62
1	Sam Houston State	60
-	Xavier	67
-	Xavier (La.)	81
-	Marist (N.Y.)	65
TOP TIER
-	Ferris State (Mich.)	78
-	Pembroke State (N.C.)	56
-	Ferris State	90
8	Maryland-Eastern Shore	95
-	Eastern Montana	107
8	Maryland-Eastern Shore	114
5	Marymount (Kan.)	73
-	Slippery Rock State (Pa.)	74
-	Slippery Rock State	104
-	Quinnipiac	75
-	Quinnipiac (Conn.)	79
-	Ouachita Baptist (Ark.)	66
TOP TIER
-	South Carolina State	82
-	Hastings (Neb.)	71
-	South Carolina State	55
4	Wisconsin-Green Bay	72
-	Dallas Baptist (Tex.)	66
4	Wisconsin-Green Bay	77
3	Kentucky State	81
-	Valdosta State (Ga.)	90
-	Valdosta State	81
-	Guilford	98
-	Guilford (N.C.)	92
-	Keene State (N.H.)	82
BOTTOM TIER
-	Westmont (Calif.)	85
-	South Dakota Tech	66
-	Westmont	86
-	Missouri Southern State	70
-	Missouri Southern State	70
6	Fairmont State (W.Va.)	63
7	Alcorn A&M (Miss.)	76
-	Oklahoma Baptist	79
-	Oklahoma Baptist	82
-	Winona State	72
-	Winona State (Minn.)	70
-	Grand Canyon (Ariz.)	64
BOTTOM TIER
-	Defiance (Ohio)	82
-	George Fox (Ore.)	62
-	Defiance	61
2	Augustana	64
-	Hanover (Ind.)	65
2	Augustana (Ill.)	66

Elite Eight
-	Xavier	80
8	Maryland-Eastern Shore	87
-	Slippery Rock State	60
4	Wisconsin-Green Bay	58
-	Guilford	70
-	Westmont	67
-	Oklahoma Baptist	46
2	Augustana	63

NAIA national semifinals
8	Maryland-Eastern Shore	113
-	Slippery Rock State	82
-	Guilford	77
2	Augustana	69

NAIA national championship
8	Maryland-Eastern Shore	96
-	Guilford	99

=== Third-place game ===
The third-place game featured the losing national semifinalist teams to determine 3rd and 4th places in the tournament. This game was played until 1988.

NAIA third-place game
-	Slippery Rock State	93
2	Augustana	96

== See also ==
- 1973 NCAA University Division basketball tournament
- 1973 NCAA College Division basketball tournament
