= 1972–73 South Carolina Gamecocks men's basketball team =

American college basketball season

1972–73 South Carolina Gamecocks men's basketball

NCAA Third Place
- Conference: Independent

Ranking
- Coaches: No. 16
- Record: 22–7
- Head coach: Frank McGuire (9th season)
- Home arena: Carolina Coliseum

1972–73 NCAA University Division men's basketball independents standings
| | Conf. | | | | Overall |
| Team | W | | L | PCT | W | | L | PCT |
|---|---|---|---|---|---|---|---|---|
| No. 4 Providence | | – | | – | 27 | – | 4 | .871 |
| No. 5 Marquette | | – | | – | 27 | – | 4 | .871 |
| No. 13 Houston | | – | | – | 23 | – | 4 | .852 |
| No. 14 Syracuse | | – | | – | 24 | – | 5 | .828 |
| Virginia Tech | | – | | – | 22 | – | 5 | .815 |
| Jacksonville | | – | | – | 21 | – | 6 | .778 |
| Oklahoma City | | – | | – | 21 | – | 6 | .778 |
| Oral Roberts | | – | | – | 21 | – | 6 | .778 |
| South Carolina | | – | | – | 22 | – | 7 | .759 |
| Marshall | | – | | – | 20 | – | 7 | .741 |
| Northeastern | | – | | – | 19 | – | 7 | .731 |
| St. John's | | – | | – | 19 | – | 7 | .731 |
| Centenary | | – | | – | 19 | – | 8 | .704 |
| Florida State | | – | | – | 18 | – | 8 | .692 |
| Northern Illinois | | – | | – | 17 | – | 8 | .680 |
| Duquesne | | – | | – | 16 | – | 8 | .667 |
| Fairfield | | – | | – | 18 | – | 9 | .667 |
| Cincinnati | | – | | – | 17 | – | 9 | .654 |
| Denver | | – | | – | 17 | – | 9 | .654 |
| George Washington | | – | | – | 17 | – | 9 | .654 |
| Penn State | | – | | – | 15 | – | 8 | .652 |
| Detroit | | – | | – | 16 | – | 9 | .640 |
| Hardin–Simmons | | – | | – | 16 | – | 9 | .640 |
| Indiana State | | – | | – | 16 | – | 10 | .615 |
| Manhattan | | – | | – | 16 | – | 10 | .615 |
| Utah State | | – | | – | 16 | – | 10 | .615 |
| Notre Dame | | – | | – | 18 | – | 12 | .600 |
| Air Force | | – | | – | 14 | – | 10 | .583 |
| Creighton | | – | | – | 15 | – | 11 | .577 |
| Hawaii | | – | | – | 15 | – | 11 | .577 |
| Rutgers | | – | | – | 15 | – | 11 | .577 |
| Stetson | | – | | – | 15 | – | 11 | .577 |
| DePaul | | – | | – | 14 | – | 11 | .560 |
| South Alabama | | – | | – | 14 | – | 11 | .560 |
| Trinity (TX) | | – | | – | 14 | – | 11 | .560 |
| Canisius | | – | | – | 13 | – | 11 | .542 |
| Butler | | – | | – | 14 | – | 12 | .538 |
| Charlotte | | – | | – | 14 | – | 12 | .538 |
| Illinois State | | – | | – | 13 | – | 12 | .520 |
| Long Island | | – | | – | 13 | – | 12 | .520 |
| Navy | | – | | – | 13 | – | 12 | .520 |
| Dayton | | – | | – | 13 | – | 13 | .500 |
| Fairleigh Dickinson | | – | | – | 13 | – | 13 | .500 |
| St. Bonaventure | | – | | – | 13 | – | 13 | .500 |
| Portland State | | – | | – | 12 | – | 12 | .500 |
| Georgetown | | – | | – | 12 | – | 14 | .462 |
| Pittsburgh | | – | | – | 12 | – | 14 | .462 |
| Tulane | | – | | – | 12 | – | 14 | .462 |
| Army | | – | | – | 11 | – | 13 | .458 |
| Boston College | | – | | – | 11 | – | 14 | .440 |
| Colgate | | – | | – | 11 | – | 14 | .440 |
| Villanova | | – | | – | 11 | – | 14 | .440 |
| Fordham | | – | | – | 12 | – | 16 | .429 |
| Southern Illinois | | – | | – | 11 | – | 15 | .423 |
| West Virginia | | – | | – | 10 | – | 15 | .400 |
| Cleveland State | | – | | – | 9 | – | 14 | .391 |
| Ball State | | – | | – | 9 | – | 15 | .375 |
| Niagara | | – | | – | 9 | – | 16 | .360 |
| Loyola (IL) | | – | | – | 8 | – | 15 | .348 |
| Holy Cross | | – | | – | 9 | – | 17 | .346 |
| Southern Miss | | – | | – | 8 | – | 16 | .333 |
| St. Francis (NY) | | – | | – | 8 | – | 16 | .333 |
| Portland | | – | | – | 9 | – | 19 | .321 |
| Seton Hall | | – | | – | 8 | – | 17 | .320 |
| Georgia Southern | | – | | – | 8 | – | 18 | .308 |
| Saint Peter's | | – | | – | 8 | – | 18 | .308 |
| Georgia Tech | | – | | – | 7 | – | 18 | .280 |
| Iona | | – | | – | 6 | – | 16 | .273 |
| Samford | | – | | – | 5 | – | 20 | .200 |
| Saint Francis (PA) | | – | | – | 5 | – | 21 | .192 |
| Pan American | | – | | – | 4 | – | 22 | .154 |
| Xavier | | – | | – | 3 | – | 23 | .115 |
Rankings from AP Poll

The 1972–73 South Carolina Gamecocks men's basketball team represented the University of South Carolina during the 1972–73 men's college basketball season.

== Roster ==
1972–73 South Carolina Gamecocks men's basketball team
Players
Coaches

| Pos. | # | Name | Height | Weight | Year | Hometown |
|---|---|---|---|---|---|---|
| F | 51 | Tommy Cox | 6 ft 6 in (1.98 m) | 205 lb (93 kg) | So | Washington, D. C. |
| G | 10 | Mike Dunleavy Sr. | 6 ft 2 in (1.88 m) | 175 lb (79 kg) | Fr | Brooklyn, New York |
| F | 22 | Alex English | 6 ft 8 in (2.03 m) | 185 lb (84 kg) | Fr | Columbia, South Carolina |
| G | 43 | Kevin Joyce | 6 ft 3 in (1.91 m) | 190 lb (86 kg) | Sr | Merrick, New York |
| C | 33 | Danny Traylor | 7 ft 0 in (2.13 m) | 240 lb (109 kg) | Sr | Winston-Salem, North Carolina |
| G | 32 | Brian Winters | 6 ft 4 in (1.93 m) | 185 lb (84 kg) | Jr | Rockaway, New York |

Head coach

- Frank McGuire

Assistant coach(es)

Legend

- (C) Team captain
- (S) Suspended
- (I) Ineligible
- (W) Walk-on
- Injured
- Current redshirt

== Schedule ==
| Date time, TV | Rank^{#} | Opponent^{#} | Result | Record | Site city, state |
|---|---|---|---|---|---|
| December 2 | | at Tennessee | L 45–55 | 0–1 | Stokely Center; Knoxville, Tennessee |
| December 4 | | UNLV | W 76–49 | 1–1 | Carolina Coliseum; Columbia, SC |
| December 9 | | Michigan State | W 83–64 | 2–1 | Carolina Coliseum; Columbia, SC |
| December 11 | | Georgia Southern | W 92–77 | 3–1 | Carolina Coliseum; Columbia, SC |
| December 15 | | vs. Providence | L 64–79 | 3–2 | Jon M. Huntsman Center; Salt Lake City, Utah |
| December 16 | | at Utah | W 77–73 | 4–2 | Jon M. Huntsman Center; Salt Lake City, Utah |
| December 22 | | Indiana | W 88–85 | 5–2 | Carolina Coliseum; Columbia, SC |
| December 26 | | vs. Villanova | W 80–64 | 6–2 | |
| December 28 | | vs. Manhattan | W 79–69 | 7–2 | Alumni Gym |
| December 30 | | vs. St. John’s | L 79–86 | 7–3 | Madison Square Garden; New York |
| January 3 | | Lafayette | W 81–48 | 8–3 | Carolina Coliseum; Columbia, SC |
| January 6 | | Fairfield | W 69–58 | 9–3 | Carolina Coliseum; Columbia, SC |
| January 8 | | at Virginia Tech | L 68–81 | 9–4 | Cassell Coliseum; Blacksburg, Virginia |
| January 13 | | Davidson | W 90–79 | 10–4 | Carolina Coliseum; Columbia, SC |
| January 20 | | at Marquette | L 54–71 | 10–5 | Milwaukee Arena; Milwaukee, WI |
| January 22 | | DePaul | W 84–66 | 11–5 | Carolina Coliseum; Columbia, SC |
| January 27 | | at Illinois | W 86–76 | 12–5 | Chicago Stadium; Chicago, Illinois |
| January 31 | | Marshall | W 88–71 | 13–5 | Carolina Coliseum; Columbia, SC |
| February 5 | | at Toledo | W 77–74 | 14–5 | The Field House; Toledo, Ohio |
| February 10 | | at St. Bonaventure | W 75–74 | 15–5 | Reilly Center; St. Bonaventure, NY |
| February 12 | | at Niagara | W 84–74 | 16–5 | Gallagher Center; Lewiston, NY |
| February 17 | | Villanova | W 77–53 | 17–5 | Carolina Coliseum; Columbia, SC |
| February 19 | | Stetson | W 81–52 | 18–5 | Carolina Coliseum; Columbia, SC |
| February 28 | | Fordham | W 77–72 | 19–5 | Carolina Coliseum; Columbia, SC |
| March 3 | | at Notre Dame | L 69–73 | 19–6 | Joyce Center; Notre Dame, IN |
| March 7 | | Duquesne | W 90–79 | 20–6 | Carolina Coliseum; Columbia, SC |
| March 10 | | vs. Texas Tech; NCAA tournament • First Round | W 78–70 | 21–6 | Levitt Arena; Wichita, Kansas |
| March 15 | | vs. Memphis State; NCAA tournament • Semifinal | L 76–90 | 21–7 | Hofheinz Pavilion; Houston, Texas |
| March 17 | | vs. Southwest Louisiana; NCAA tournament • Third Place | W 90–85 | 22–7 | Hofheinz Pavilion; Houston, Texas |
*Non-conference game. ^{#}Rankings from AP Poll. (#) Tournament seedings in parentheses.
