= 1973 National Invitation Tournament =

Annual NCAA college basketball competition

- Teams: 16
- Finals site: Madison Square Garden, New York City
- Champions: Virginia Tech Hokies (1st title)
- Runner-up: Notre Dame Fighting Irish (1st title game)
- Semifinalists: North Carolina Tar Heels (2nd semifinal); Alabama Crimson Tide (1st semifinal)
- Winning coach: Don DeVoe (1st title)
- MVP: John Shumate (Notre Dame)

The 1973 National Invitation Tournament was the 1973 edition of the annual NCAA college basketball competition. The tournament started on March 17 and concluded on March 25, with all fifteen games at Madison Square Garden in New York City. It was won by Virginia Tech, which won its four games by a total of five points, including a 92–91 overtime victory over Notre Dame.

== Selected teams ==
Below is a list of the 16 teams selected for the tournament. For the first time, the Pacific-8 Conference allowed a member to participate; USC fell to Notre Dame by four points in the opening round.

- Alabama
- American
- Fairfield
- Louisville
- Manhattan
- Marshall
- Massachusetts
- Minnesota
- Missouri
- New Mexico
- North Carolina
- Notre Dame
- Oral Roberts
- Rutgers
- USC
- Virginia Tech

== Bracket ==
First Round; March 17–19
North Carolina	82
Oral Roberts	65
Massachusetts	78
Missouri	71
Louisville	97
American	84
Notre Dame	69
USC	65
Virginia Tech	65
New Mexico	63
Fairfield	80
Marshall	76
Alabama	87
Manhattan	86
Minnesota	68
Rutgers	59

Quarterfinals; March 20 & 22
North Carolina	73
Massachusetts	63
Louisville	71
Notre Dame	79
Virginia Tech	77
Fairfield	76
Alabama	69
Minnesota	65

Semifinals; Saturday, March 24
North Carolina	71
Notre Dame	78
Virginia Tech	74
Alabama	73

Finals; Sunday, March 25
Notre Dame	91
Virginia Tech	92

Third place game
North Carolina	88
Alabama	69

For years after the third-place game, North Carolina hung a banner in the Dean Smith Center that read "NIT 3RD PLACE 1973." The banner became the subject of ridicule from rival fans, and has since been removed.

== See also ==
- 1973 NCAA University Division basketball tournament
- 1973 NCAA College Division basketball tournament
- 1973 NAIA Division I men's basketball tournament
- 1973 National Women's Invitational Tournament
