= Stu Aberdeen =

American basketball coach (1935–1979)

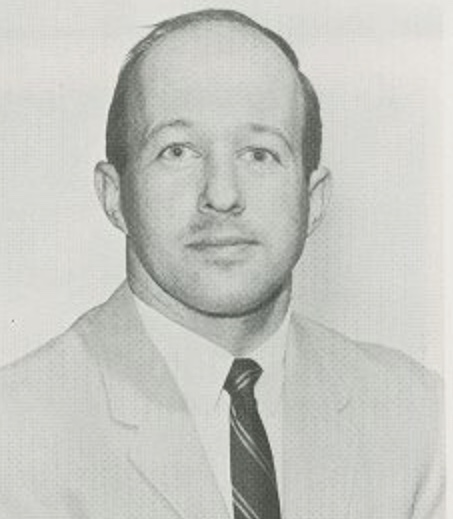
- Aberdeen as an assistant at Tennessee

Biographical details
- Born: July 19, 1935; Niagara Falls, New York, U.S.
- Died: June 11, 1979 (aged 43); New Smyrna Beach, Florida, U.S.
- Education: Tusculum (1957); Springfield (MA)

Coaching career (HC unless noted)
- 1958–1966: Acadia
- 1966–1977: Tennessee (assistant)
- 1977–1979: Marshall

Head coaching record
- Overall: 147–81

Accomplishments and honors

Championships
- W. P. McGee Trophy (1965)

Stuart Worth Aberdeen (July 19, 1935 – June 11, 1979) was an American college basketball coach. He was the head coach at Acadia in Nova Scotia and the head coach at Marshall. At Acadia, Aberdeen had a 122–50 record. He was posthumously inducted into the Acadia Hall of Fame in 1989.

Aberdeen left Acadia to become an assistant to Ray Mears at Tennessee, where he was the lead recruiter for some of UT's top players, including future Hall of Fame forward Bernard King. He left the Volunteers after eleven years, taking the head coaching position at Marshall. Aberdeen had a record of 25–31 in two seasons at Marshall. During the 1979 offseason, while vacationing in Florida, Aberdeen died from a heart attack while jogging.

== Head coaching record ==
Record table
Season	Team	Overall	Conference	Standing	Postseason
Marshall Thundering Herd (Southern Conference) (1977–1979)
1977–78	Marshall	14–15	8–5	3rd	
1978–79	Marshall	11–16	5–8	5th	
Marshall:		25–31 (.446)	13–13 (.500)		
Total:		147–81 (.645)			
