= Dwight Freeman =

American basketball player and coach

Biographical details
- Born: June 29, 1959 (age 67); Washington, D.C., U.S.

Playing career
- 1977–1978: Southeast CC
- 1979–1981: SMU
- 1981–1982: Western State

Coaching career (HC unless noted)
- 1983–1984: Moberly CC (assistant)
- 1984–1985: Hutchinson CC (assistant)
- 1985–1988: Delaware State (assistant)
- 1988–1989: Colgate (assistant)
- 1989–1990: Marshall (assistant)
- 1990–1994: Marshall
- 1994–1995: James Madison (assistant)
- 1995–2002: Miami (FL) (assistant)
- 2002–2007: Norfolk State

Head coaching record
- Overall: 109–148

Dwight Freeman (born June 29, 1959) is an American former basketball player and coach. He was previously the head coach at Marshall and Norfolk State. At Marshall, he was the first black head basketball coach in Southern Conference history.

== Head coaching record ==
Record table
Season	Team	Overall	Conference	Standing	Postseason
Marshall Thundering Herd (Southern Conference) (1990–1994)
1990–91	Marshall	14–14	7–7	4th	
1991–92	Marshall	7–22	3–11	6th	
1992–93	Marshall	16–11	11–7	4th	
1993–94	Marshall	9–18	7–11	7th	
Marshall:		46–65 (.414)	28–36 (.438)		
Norfolk State Spartans (Mid-Eastern Athletic Conference) (2002–2007)
2002–03	Norfolk State	14–15	10–8	6th	
2003–04	Norfolk State	12–17	10–8	5th	
2004–05	Norfolk State	13–14	11–7	4th	
2005–06	Norfolk State	13–18	10–8	5th	
2006–07	Norfolk State	11–19	10–8	3rd	
Norfolk State:		63–83 (.432)	51–39 (.567)		
Total:		109–148 (.424)			
National champion Postseason invitational champion Conference regular season champion Conference regular season and conference tournament champion Division regular season champion Division regular season and conference tournament champion Conference tournament champion
