= Bill Strickling =

American lawyer and basketball player (1894–1952)

- Born: Charles William Strickling; January 3, 1894; Middlebourne, West Virginia, U.S.
- Died: June 14, 1952 (aged 58); Huntington, West Virginia, U.S.
- Education: Marshall College; University of Virginia (JD)
- Occupations: Lawyer; college basketball coach; referee
- Spouse: Bonnie Aarons (m. 1941)
- Children: 2
- Coaching career

Playing career
- 1911–1912: Marshall
- 1914–1916: Virginia
- Position: Center

Coaching career (HC unless noted)
- 1923–1924: Marshall
- 1926–1927: Marshall

Head coaching record
- Overall: 15–17

Charles William Strickling (January 3, 1894 – June 14, 1952) was an American attorney, college basketball player and coach, and sports official.

== Playing career ==
Strickling was the team captain of the Virginia basketball team while attending University of Virginia School of Law. In 1915, Strickling helped lead Virginia to an undefeated 17–0 record. Prior to playing basketball at Virginia, he played basketball at Marshall.

In addition to playing college basketball, Strickling was also a member of Marshall's and Virginia's baseball team.

== Coaching and officiating career ==
Strickling returned to Marshall College as head coach of the men's basketball team. He coached two stints with Marshall in 1923–1924 and 1926–1927.

He served as the head of the West Virginia board of officials.

== Legal career ==
Strickling served as the city attorney of Huntington, West Virginia from 1922 until 1925. He also served as the president of the West Virginia Bar Association until his death in 1952.

== Head coaching record ==
Record table
Season	Team	Overall	Conference	Standing	Postseason
Marshall (Independent) (1923–1924)
1923–24	Marshall	8–7			
Marshall (Independent) (1926–1927)
1926–27	Marshall	7–10			
Marshall:		15–17 (.469)			
Total:		15–17 (.469)			
