= Ron Jirsa =

American college basketball coach (born 1959)

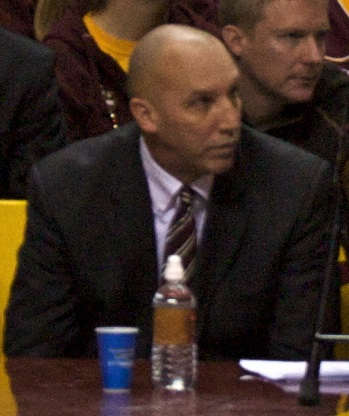
- Jirsa in 2009 as Minnesota assistant coach.

Current position
- Title: Assistant coach
- Team: Eastern Kentucky
- Conference: Atlantic Sun

Biographical details
- Born: December 21, 1959 (age 66); New London, Connecticut, U.S.
- Education: Gettysburg College (B.A., 1981); University of Tulsa (M.A., 1987)

Playing career
- 1977–1981: Gettysburg

Coaching career (HC unless noted)
- 1981–1983: Connecticut College (asst.)
- 1983–1984: Delaware (asst.)
- 1984–1985: VCU (grad. asst.)
- 1985–1988: Tulsa (asst.)
- 1988–1989: Belmont Abbey (asst.)
- 1990–1991: Gardner-Webb (asst.)
- 1991–1994: Tulsa (asst.)
- 1994–1995: Tulsa (assoc. HC)
- 1995–1997: Georgia (assoc. HC)
- 1997–1999: Georgia
- 1999–2003: Dayton (asst.)
- 2003–2007: Marshall
- 2007–2013: Minnesota (asst.)
- 2013–2014: Bethel (MN) (RC)
- 2014–2015: Tennessee Tech (asst.)
- 2015–2021: Radford (asst.)
- 2021–2024: UNC Greensboro (asst.)
- 2024–present: Eastern Kentucky (asst.)

Head coaching record
- Overall: 78–104

Ronald Howard Jirsa (born December 21, 1959) is an American college basketball coach who is currently an assistant coach at Eastern Kentucky. He was previously the head coach at Georgia and Marshall.

== Early life and education ==
Jirsa was born in New London, Connecticut and grew up in nearby Ledyard. After graduating from Ledyard High School in 1977, Jirsa attended Gettysburg College. A member of the basketball team, Jirsa graduated from Gettysburg in 1981 with a Bachelor of Arts degree in biology.

== Coaching career ==
Jirsa bounced around as an assistant coach, but had two significant stints at the University of Tulsa, first under J. D. Barnett from 1985 to 1988 and second under Tubby Smith from 1991 to 1993. Jirsa completed his Master of Arts degree in athletic administration at Tulsa in 1987 while an assistant coach there. Smith promoted Jirsa to associate head coach in 1994, and Jirsa followed Smith to the University of Georgia.

When Smith departed for the University of Kentucky in 1997, Jirsa remained at Georgia and became head coach. Although Jirsa led Georgia to third place in the 1998 National Invitation Tournament title in his first season, he was fired in 1999 after going 35–30.

Jirsa moved to Dayton and was an assistant for four seasons there. In June 2003, he was hired to coach Marshall. Jirsa was fired after four seasons at Marshall, going 43–74. Most recently, he served under Tubby Smith as an assistant at the University of Minnesota. On March 25, 2013, it was announced that Smith, along with his entire staff had been relieved as coaches at Minnesota.

In the 2013–14 season, Jirsa was recruiting coordinator at Division III Bethel University in Minnesota. The following season, Jirsa joined Steve Payne's coaching staff as an assistant at Tennessee Tech. In 2015, Jirsa made yet another move, this time as an assistant at Radford under Mike Jones, following Jones to UNCG when Jones was named head coach there in 2021.

== Head coaching record ==
Record table
Season	Team	Overall	Conference	Standing	Postseason
Georgia Bulldogs (Southeastern Conference) (1997–1999)
1997–98	Georgia	20–15	7–9	T–4th (East)	NIT Third Place
1998–99	Georgia	15–15	6–10	4th (East)	NIT First Round
Georgia:		35–30	13–19		
Marshall Thundering Herd (Mid-American Conference) (2003–2005)
2003–04	Marshall	12–17	8–10	4th (East)	
2004–05	Marshall	6–22	3–15	6th (East)	
Marshall Thundering Herd (Conference USA) (2005–2007)
2005–06	Marshall	12–16	5–9	9th	
2006–07	Marshall	13–19	7–9	T–8th	
Marshall:		43–74	23–43		
Total:		78–104			
