= Herbert Cramer =

American athlete and coach (1894–1963)

Biographical details
- Born: October 16, 1894; Baraboo, Wisconsin, U.S.
- Died: October 30, 1963 (aged 69); South Bend, Indiana, U.S.

Playing career

Football
- 1916–1917: Wisconsin
- 1919: Wisconsin

Coaching career (HC unless noted)

Football
- 1920: Marshall

Basketball
- 1921–1922: Marshall

Baseball
- 1921: Marshall

Administrative career (AD unless noted)
- 1920–1921: Marshall

Head coaching record
- Overall: 0–8 (football); 5–4–1 (basketball); 3–5 (baseball)

Herbert Lyle Cramer (October 16, 1894 – October 30, 1963) was an American football, basketball, and baseball player and coach. He served as the head football coach at Marshall University during the 1920 season, compiling a record of 0–8. Cramer was also the head basketball coach at Marshall in 1921–22, tallying a mark of 5–4–1, and the school's head baseball coach in 1921, amassing a record of 3–5.

== Head coaching record ==
=== Football ===
Year	Team	Overall	Conference	Standing	Bowl/playoffs
Marshall Thundering Herd (Independent) (1920)
1920	Marshall	0–8			
Marshall:		0–8			
Total:		0–8			
