= Russ Meredith =

American football player and politician (1897–1989)

Member of the West Virginia House of Delegates from Marion County
- In office 1939–1942

Personal details
- Born: Russell Delmar Meredith; June 27, 1897 Fairmont, West Virginia, U.S.
- Died: March 22, 1989 (aged 91) Fairmont, West Virginia, U.S.
- Party: Democratic
- Spouse: Helen Devol (m. 1933)
- Education: West Virginia University
- Football career

Profile
- Position: Guard

Personal information
- Listed height: 5 ft 11 in (1.80 m)
- Listed weight: 200 lb (91 kg)

Career information
- High school: Fairmont Senior (Fairmont, West Virginia)
- College: West Virginia

Career history
- Louisville Brecks (1923); Cleveland Bulldogs (1925)

Career statistics
- Games played: 10
- Games started: 0

Russell Delmar Meredith (June 27, 1897 – March 22, 1989) was an American football guard in the National Football League (NFL) and politician. He played a single season with the Louisville Brecks and the Cleveland Bulldogs. He played college football and basketball at West Virginia. As a politician, he served in the West Virginia House of Delegates from 1939 to 1942.

Meredith was also the head coach for Marshall's football, baseball, and men's basketball teams. In addition, he was the line coach at West Virginia and the head football coach at Salem College.

== Head coaching record ==
=== Football ===
Year	Team	Overall	Conference	Standing	Bowl/playoffs
Marshall Thundering Herd (Independent) (1924)
1924	Marshall	4–4			
Marshall:		4–4			
Salem Tigers (West Virginia Athletic Conference) (1929)
1929	Salem	2–6	2–5	8th	
Salem:		2–6	2–5		
Total:		6–10			

=== Basketball ===
Record table
Season	Team	Overall	Conference	Standing	Postseason
Marshall Thundering Herd (Independent) (1924–1925)
1924–25	Marshall	12–6			
Marshall:		12–6 (.667)			
Total:		12–6 (.667)			

=== Baseball ===
Record table
Season	Team	Overall	Conference	Standing	Postseason
Marshall Thundering Herd (Independent) (1925)
1925	Marshall	4–5			
Marshall:		4–5 (.444)			
Total:		4–5 (.444)			
