= Stewart Way =

American basketball coach (1911–1980)

Biographical details
- Born: January 19, 1911; Wayne County, West Virginia, U.S.
- Died: May 5, 1980 (aged 69); Huntington, West Virginia, U.S.
- Education: Georgetown (KY)

Coaching career (HC unless noted)
- 1966–1969: Marshall (assistant)
- 1969–1971: Marshall
- 1971–1975: Marshall (assistant)

Head coaching record
- Overall: 25–24

Warren Stewart Way (January 19, 1911 – May 5, 1980) was an American college basketball coach. He was the head coach and a longtime assistant at Marshall. While at Marshall, Way was named acting head coach in 1969 after head coach Ellis T. Johnson resigned and Marshall was subsequently suspended from the Mid-American Conference due to alleged recruiting violations. A year later he was named the school's full time head coach.

Way became the associate head coach at Marshall under Carl Tacy in 1971 after Way made the request to athletic director Joe McMullen. Way would remain the associate head coach at Marshall until 1975 when he retired from coaching. Prior to his tenure at Marshall, Way was the head coach at Ceredo-Kenova High School, Scott High School, and Huntington High School in West Virginia.

Way died of cancer on May 5, 1980.

== Head coaching record ==
Record table
Season	Team	Overall	Conference	Standing	Postseason
Marshall Thundering Herd (Independent) (1969–1971)
1969–70	Marshall	9–14			
1970–71	Marshall	16–10			
Marshall:		25–24 (.510)			
Total:		25–24 (.510)			
