= Arch Reilly =

American baseball player (1891–1963)

- Third baseman
- Born: August 17, 1891; Alton, Illinois, U.S.
- Died: November 29, 1963 (aged 72); Columbus, Ohio, U.S.
- Batted: Right Threw: Right

MLB debut
- June 1, 1917, for the Pittsburgh Pirates

Last MLB appearance
- June 1, 1917, for the Pittsburgh Pirates

MLB statistics
- Games played: 1
- At bats: 0
- Hits: 0
- Stats at Baseball Reference

Teams
- Pittsburgh Pirates (1917)

Archer Edwin Reilly (August 17, 1891 – November 29, 1963) was an American Major League Baseball player. Reilly played in one game in 1917, for the Pittsburgh Pirates. He did not get an at-bat in the game, only playing third base.

Reilly led the Marshall College (now University) football team to an 8–0 season in his only year as Marshall's football coach, in 1919. As the Marshall baseball coach in spring of 1920, his team was 8–8, and was the Herd basketball coach for 1918–19, leading the team to a 2–5 mark.

Reilly had played for Marshall, leading the Herd to the state collegiate championship with a 14–6 mark for head coach Boyd Chambers. He lettered for the Ohio State Buckeyes in basketball in 1911, 1912 and 1913. In those seasons, Ohio State's record was 7–2, 7–5, 13–7.

Reilly was born in Alton, Illinois and died in Columbus, Ohio. He started in the minor leagues in Springfield (Ohio.) for the Reapers in 1913 in the Central League, batting .267 with 20 doubles, 10 triples and one home run. In 1914, he played for both Springfield and for the Grand Rapids (Mich.) Champs, batting .271 with 18 doubles, six triples and two homers.

In 1915 and 1916, he joined the Wheeling (W.Va.) Stogies, eventually becoming acting manager midway through the 1915 season. He played and coached the legendary Earle "Greasy" Neale, from West Virginia Wesleyan College, who later played in the World Series with the champion Cincinnati Reds in 1919 (the legendary "Black Sox" series with Chicago taking money to throw games).

Reilly hit .292 for Wheeling in 1916 in the Central League, with 103 hits in 353 at-bats. He then played for both Scranton Miners in the New York State League in 1917, and also played for the Richmond (Va.) Quakers team in the Central League. He hit .250 at Scranton, then .245 at Richmond, and also got the one game call-up to Pittsburgh in 1917.

== Head coaching record ==
=== Football ===
Year	Team	Overall	Conference	Standing	Bowl/playoffs
Marshall Thundering Herd (Independent) (1919)
1919	Marshall	8–0			
Marshall:		8–0			
Total:		8–0			
