= 1977–78 NCAA Division I men's basketball season =

Basketball season

- Preseason AP No. 1: North Carolina Tar Heels
- NCAA Tournament: 1978
- Tournament dates: March 11 – 27, 1978
- National Championship: The Checkerdome; St. Louis, Missouri
- NCAA Champions: Kentucky Wildcats
- Helms National Champions: Kentucky Wildcats
- Other champions: Texas Longhorns (NIT)
- Player of the Year (Naismith, Wooden): Butch Lee, Marquette Warriors (Naismith); Phil Ford, North Carolina Tar Heels (Wooden)
- Player of the Year (Helms): Jack Givens, Kentucky Wildcats

The 1977–78 NCAA Division I men's basketball season began in November 1977, progressed through the regular season and conference tournaments, and concluded with the 1978 NCAA Men's Division I Basketball Tournament Championship Game on March 27, 1978, at The Checkerdome in St. Louis, Missouri. The Kentucky Wildcats won their fifth NCAA national championship with a 94–88 victory over the Duke Blue Devils. It was also the first NCAA tournament to use an official seeding process.

== Season headlines ==
- On December 13, 1977, the University of Evansville's first season of NCAA Division I men's basketball came to a tragic and premature end when Air Indiana Flight 216 crashed just after takeoff from Evansville Regional Airport in Evansville, Indiana, killing all 29 people on board, including Evansville Purple Aces head coach Bobby Watson and all but one member of the team, which was on its way to Murfreesboro, Tennessee, for a game against Middle Tennessee. The only surviving member of the team, 18-year-old freshman David Furr, was not on the plane because he was out for the season with an ankle injury, but Furr and his younger brother died in an automobile accident two weeks after the plane crash. With its entire 1977–78 men's basketball team dead after Furr's accident, the university decided to cancel the rest of the season rather than attempt to continue it with a substitute team.
- In the Pacific 8 Conference, UCLA won its 12th of what would ultimately be 13 consecutive conference titles.
- For the first time, the NCAA used a seeding process to align teams in the NCAA tournament brackets.
- Bob Bender of Duke becomes the first player to play in the NCAA championship game for two different teams. He had played for Indiana in the 1976 championship game.

== Season outlook ==
=== Pre-season polls ===
The top 20 from the AP Poll during the pre-season.

'Associated Press'
Ranking	Team
1	North Carolina
2	Kentucky
3	Marquette
4	Notre Dame
5	San Francisco
6	UCLA
7	Arkansas
8	UNLV
9	Cincinnati
10	Louisville
11	Syracuse
12	Purdue
13	Michigan
14	Maryland
15	Alabama
16	Minnesota
17	Wake Forest
18	Holy Cross
19	Detroit
20	St. John's

UPI Coaches
Ranking	Team
1 (tie)	Kentucky
1 (tie)	North Carolina
3	Marquette
4	Notre Dame
5	San Francisco
6	UCLA
7	Purdue
8	Cincinnati
9	Arkansas
10	Louisville
11	Orange
12	Michigan
13	Maryland
14 (tie)	Indiana State
14 (tie)	St. John's
14 (tie)	Utah
14 (tie)	Wake Forest
18	Kansas State
19	Alabama
20	Holy Cross

== Conference membership changes ==
School	Former conference	New conference
Buffalo Bulls	Division I independent	SUNYAC (D-III)
Campbell Fighting Camels	NAIA Independent	Division I independent
Chattanooga Mocs	Division II independent	Southern Conference
Creighton Bluejays	Division I independent	Missouri Valley Conference
East Carolina Pirates	Southern Conference	Division I independent
Evansville Purple Aces	Indiana Collegiate Conference (D–II)	Division I independent
Indiana State Sycamores	Division I independent	Missouri Valley Conference
Marshall Thundering Herd	Division I independent	Southern Conference
Tennessee State Tigers	Division II independent	Division I independent
UC Irvine Anteaters	Division II independent	Pacific Coast Athletic Association
Western Carolina Catamounts	Division I independent	Southern Conference
William and Mary Tribe	Southern Conference	Division I independent

== Regular season ==
=== Conferences ===
==== Conference winners and tournaments ====
The Southwestern Athletic Conference — with members Alcorn State, Grambling State, Jackson State, Mississippi Valley State, Prairie View A&M, Southern, and Texas Southern — became a Division I conference this season.

Conference	Regular season winner	Conference player of the year	Conference tournament	Tournament venue (City)	Tournament winner
Atlantic Coast Conference	North Carolina	Phil Ford, North Carolina	1978 ACC men's basketball tournament	Greensboro Coliseum (Greensboro, North Carolina)	Duke
Big Eight Conference	Kansas	Mike Evans, Kansas State	1978 Big Eight Conference men's basketball tournament	Kemper Arena (Kansas City, Missouri) (Semifinals and Finals)	Missouri
Big Sky Conference	Montana	None selected	1978 Big Sky Conference men's basketball tournament	Adams Field House (Missoula, Montana)	Weber State
Big Ten Conference	Michigan State	None Selected	No Tournament		
East Coast Conference	La Salle (East); Lafayette (West)	Michael Brooks, La Salle	1978 East Coast Conference men's basketball tournament	Kirby Sports Center (Easton, Pennsylvania)	La Salle
Eastern Athletic Association (Eastern 8)	Rutgers & Villanova	James Bailey, Rutgers	1978 Eastern 8 men's basketball tournament	Civic Arena (Pittsburgh, Pennsylvania)	Villanova
Eastern College Athletic; Conference (ECAC)	Division I ECAC members played as independents during the regular season (see note)		1978 ECAC Metro Region tournament	Nassau Coliseum (Uniondale, New York)	St. John's
Eastern College Athletic; Conference (ECAC)	Division I ECAC members played as independents during the regular season (see note)		1978 ECAC New England Region tournament	Providence Civic Center (Providence, Rhode Island)	Rhode Island
Eastern College Athletic; Conference (ECAC)	Division I ECAC members played as independents during the regular season (see note)		1978 ECAC South-Upstate Region tournament	War Memorial Auditorium (Rochester, New York) (Finals)	St. Bonaventure
Ivy League	Penn	Keven McDonald, Penn	No Tournament		
Metro Conference	Florida State	Harry Davis, Florida State, & Rick Wilson, Louisville	1978 Metro Conference men's basketball tournament	Riverfront Coliseum (Cincinnati, Ohio)	Louisville
Mid-American Conference	Miami (OH)	Archie Aldridge, Miami (OH)	No Tournament		
Missouri Valley Conference	Creighton	Larry Bird, Indiana State	1978 Missouri Valley Conference men's basketball tournament	Omaha Civic Auditorium (Omaha, Nebraska)	Creighton
Ohio Valley Conference	East Tennessee State & Middle Tennessee	Otis Howard, Austin Peay	1978 Ohio Valley Conference men's basketball tournament	E.A. Diddle Arena (Bowling Green, Kentucky) (Semifinals and Finals)	Western Kentucky
Pacific-8 Conference	UCLA	David Greenwood, UCLA Bruins men's basketball<	No Tournament		
Pacific Coast Athletic Association	Fresno State & San Diego State	Joel Kramer, San Diego State	1978 Pacific Coast Athletic Association men's basketball tournament	Anaheim Convention Center (Anaheim, California)	Cal State Fullerton
Southeastern Conference	Kentucky	Reggie King, Alabama	No Tournament		
Southern Conference	Appalachian State	Ron Carter, VMI	1978 Southern Conference men's basketball tournament	Roanoke Civic Center (Roanoke, Virginia) (Semifinals and Finals)	Furman
Southland Conference	Lamar & McNeese State	Andrew Toney, Southwest Louisiana	No Tournament		
Southwest Conference	Arkansas & Texas	Ron Brewer, Arkansas	1978 Southwest Conference men's basketball tournament	The Summit (Houston, Texas)	Houston
Southwestern Athletic Conference	Jackson State & Southern	Purvis Short, Jackson State	1978 SWAC men's basketball tournament		Jackson State
Sun Belt Conference	UNC Charlotte	Wayne Cooper, New Orleans	1978 Sun Belt Conference men's basketball tournament	Charlotte Coliseum (Charlotte, North Carolina) (Semifinals and Finals)	New Orleans
West Coast Athletic Conference	San Francisco	Bill Cartwright, San Francisco	No Tournament		
Western Athletic Conference	New Mexico	None Selected	No Tournament		

NOTE: From 1975 to 1981, the Eastern College Athletic Conference (ECAC), a loosely organized sports federation of colleges and universities in the Northeastern United States, organized Division I ECAC regional tournaments for those of its members that were independents in basketball. Each 1978 tournament winner received an automatic bid to the 1978 NCAA Men's Division I Basketball Tournament in the same way that the tournament champions of conventional athletic conferences did.

==== Conference standings ====
1977–78 ACC men's basketball standings
	Conf.				Overall
Team	W		L	PCT	W		L	PCT
No. 16 North Carolina	9	–	3	.750	23	–	8	.742
No. 7 Duke †	8	–	4	.667	27	–	7	.794
NC State	7	–	5	.583	21	–	10	.677
Virginia	6	–	6	.500	20	–	8	.714
Wake Forest	6	–	6	.500	19	–	10	.655
Maryland	3	–	9	.250	15	–	13	.536
Clemson	3	–	9	.250	15	–	12	.556
† 1978 ACC tournament winner Rankings from AP Poll

1977–78 Big Eight Conference men's basketball standings
	Conf.				Overall
Team	W		L	PCT	W		L	PCT
No. 10 Kansas	13	–	1	.929	24	–	5	.828
Iowa State	9	–	5	.643	14	–	13	.519
Nebraska	9	–	5	.643	22	–	8	.733
Kansas State	7	–	7	.500	18	–	11	.621
Oklahoma	7	–	7	.500	14	–	13	.519
Oklahoma State	4	–	10	.286	10	–	16	.385
Missouri †	4	–	10	.286	14	–	16	.467
Colorado	3	–	11	.214	9	–	18	.333
† 1978 Big Eight tournament winner Rankings from AP Poll

1977–78 Big Sky men's basketball standings
	Conf.				Overall
Team	W		L	PCT	W		L	PCT
Montana	12	–	2	.857	20	–	8	.714
Idaho State	11	–	3	.786	16	–	10	.615
Weber State †	9	–	5	.643	19	–	10	.655
Boise State	8	–	6	.571	13	–	14	.481
Gonzaga	7	–	7	.500	14	–	15	.483
Northern Arizona	5	–	9	.357	11	–	14	.440
Montana State	3	–	11	.214	9	–	17	.346
Idaho	1	–	13	.071	4	–	22	.154
† Big Sky Conference tournament winner

1977–78 Big Ten Conference men's basketball standings
	Conf.				Overall
Team	W		L	PCT	W		L	PCT
No. 4 Michigan State	15	–	3	.833	25	–	5	.833
No. 13 Indiana	12	–	6	.667	21	–	8	.724
Minnesota	12	–	6	.667	17	–	10	.630
Michigan	11	–	7	.611	16	–	11	.593
Purdue	11	–	7	.611	16	–	11	.593
Ohio State	9	–	9	.500	16	–	11	.593
Illinois	7	–	11	.389	13	–	14	.481
Iowa	5	–	13	.278	12	–	15	.444
Northwestern	4	–	14	.222	8	–	19	.296
Wisconsin	4	–	14	.222	8	–	19	.296
Rankings from AP Poll

1977–78 ECC men's basketball standings
	Conf.				Overall
Team	W		L	PCT	W		L	PCT
East
La Salle †	5	–	0	1.000	18	–	12	.600
Temple	4	–	1	.800	24	–	4	.857
American	2	–	3	.400	16	–	12	.571
Drexel	2	–	3	.400	13	–	15	.464
Saint Joseph's	2	–	3	.400	13	–	15	.464
Hofstra	0	–	5	.000	8	–	19	.296
West
Lafayette	10	–	0	1.000	23	–	8	.742
Delaware	5	–	5	.500	16	–	11	.593
Bucknell	5	–	5	.500	13	–	15	.464
Lehigh	5	–	5	.500	8	–	18	.308
Rider	4	–	6	.400	11	–	16	.407
West Chester	2	–	8	.200	6	–	19	.240
† 1978 ECC tournament winner Rankings from AP Poll

1977–78 Eastern 8 men's basketball standings
	Conf.				Overall
Team	W		L	PCT	W		L	PCT
East
Rutgers	7	–	3	.700	24	–	7	.774
Villanova †	7	–	3	.700	23	–	9	.719
Pittsburgh	5	–	5	.500	16	–	11	.593
UMass	5	–	5	.500	15	–	12	.556
West
Duquesne	5	–	5	.500	11	–	17	.393
George Washington	4	–	6	.400	15	–	11	.577
Penn State	4	–	6	.400	8	–	19	.296
West Virginia	3	–	7	.300	12	–	16	.429
† 1978 Eastern 8 Tournament winner Rankings from AP Poll

1977–78 Ivy League men's basketball standings
	Conf.				Overall
Team	W		L	PCT	W		L	PCT
No. 20 Penn	12	–	2	.857	20	–	8	.714
Princeton	11	–	3	.786	17	–	9	.654
Columbia	11	–	3	.786	15	–	11	.577
Harvard	7	–	7	.500	11	–	15	.423
Dartmouth	5	–	9	.357	10	–	16	.385
Cornell	5	–	9	.357	9	–	17	.346
Yale	3	–	11	.214	8	–	16	.333
Brown	2	–	12	.143	4	–	22	.154
Rankings from AP Poll

1977–78 Metro Conference men's basketball standings
	Conf.				Overall
Team	W		L	PCT	W		L	PCT
No. 15 Florida State	12	–	1	.923	23	–	6	.793
No. 9 Louisville †	9	–	3	.750	23	–	7	.767
Memphis State	7	–	5	.583	19	–	9	.679
Cincinnati	6	–	6	.500	17	–	10	.630
Georgia Tech	6	–	6	.500	15	–	12	.556
Saint Louis	2	–	10	.167	7	–	20	.259
Tulane	1	–	12	.077	5	–	22	.185
† 1978 Metro Conference tournament winner Rankings from AP Poll

1977–78 Mid-American Conference men's basketball standings
	Conf.				Overall
Team	W		L	PCT	W		L	PCT
No. 19 Miami (Ohio)	12	–	4	.750	19	–	9	.679
Toledo	11	–	5	.688	21	–	6	.778
Central Michigan	11	–	5	.688	16	–	10	.615
Bowling Green State	10	–	6	.625	12	–	15	.444
Northern Illinois	9	–	7	.563	11	–	16	.407
Eastern Michigan	7	–	9	.438	11	–	16	.407
Ohio	6	–	10	.375	13	–	14	.481
Ball State	6	–	10	.375	10	–	15	.400
Western Michigan	4	–	12	.250	7	–	20	.259
Kent State	4	–	12	.250	6	–	21	.222
Rankings from AP Poll

1977–78 Missouri Valley Conference men's basketball standings
	Conf.				Overall
Team	W		L	PCT	W		L	PCT
Creighton †	12	–	4	.750	19	–	9	.679
Southern Illinois	11	–	5	.688	17	–	10	.630
Indiana State	11	–	5	.688	23	–	9	.719
New Mexico State	9	–	7	.563	15	–	14	.517
Bradley	8	–	8	.500	14	–	14	.500
Wichita State	8	–	8	.500	13	–	14	.481
Tulsa	7	–	9	.438	9	–	18	.333
West Texas State	4	–	12	.250	8	–	19	.296
Drake	2	–	14	.125	6	–	22	.214
† 1978 MVC tournament winner Rankings from AP Poll

1977–78 Ohio Valley Conference men's basketball standings
	Conf.				Overall
Team	W		L	PCT	W		L	PCT
Middle Tennessee	10	–	4	.714	18	–	8	.692
East Tennessee State	10	–	4	.714	18	–	9	.667
Western Kentucky†	9	–	5	.643	16	–	14	.533
Austin Peay State	8	–	6	.571	15	–	12	.556
Eastern Kentucky	8	–	6	.571	15	–	11	.577
Tennessee Tech	7	–	7	.500	11	–	15	.423
Murray State	4	–	10	.286	8	–	17	.320
Morehead State	0	–	14	.000	4	–	19	.174
† 1978 OVC tournament winner Rankings from AP Poll

1977–78 Pacific-8 Conference men's basketball standings
	Conf.				Overall
Team	W		L	PCT	W		L	PCT
No. 2 UCLA	14	–	0	1.000	25	–	3	.893
Oregon State	9	–	5	.643	16	–	11	.593
Washington State	7	–	7	.500	16	–	11	.593
USC	7	–	7	.500	14	–	13	.519
Oregon	6	–	8	.429	16	–	11	.593
Washington	6	–	8	.429	14	–	13	.519
California	4	–	10	.286	11	–	16	.407
Stanford	3	–	11	.214	13	–	14	.481
Rankings from AP Poll

1977–78 Pacific Coast Athletic Association men's basketball standings
	Conf.				Overall
Team	W		L	PCT	W		L	PCT
Fresno State	11	–	3	.786	21	–	6	.778
San Diego State	11	–	3	.786	19	–	9	.679
Cal State Fullerton †	9	–	5	.643	23	–	9	.719
Pacific	9	–	5	.643	17	–	10	.630
Long Beach State	7	–	7	.500	16	–	13	.552
San Jose State	4	–	10	.286	8	–	19	.296
UC Santa Barbara	3	–	11	.214	8	–	19	.296
UC Irvine	2	–	12	.143	8	–	17	.320
† 1978 PCAA tournament winner Rankings from AP Poll

1977–78 Southeastern Conference men's basketball standings
	Conf.				Overall
Team	W		L	PCT	W		L	PCT
No. 1 Kentucky	16	–	2	.889	30	–	2	.938
Mississippi State	13	–	5	.722	18	–	9	.667
LSU	12	–	6	.667	18	–	9	.667
Alabama	11	–	7	.611	17	–	10	.630
Florida	8	–	10	.444	15	–	12	.556
Auburn	8	–	10	.444	13	–	14	.481
Tennessee	6	–	12	.333	11	–	16	.407
Vanderbilt	6	–	12	.333	10	–	17	.370
Georgia	5	–	13	.278	11	–	16	.407
Ole Miss	5	–	13	.278	10	–	17	.370
Rankings from AP Poll

1977–78 Southern Conference men's basketball standings
	Conf.				Overall
Team	W		L	PCT	W		L	PCT
Appalachian State	9	–	3	.750	15	–	13	.536
VMI	7	–	3	.700	21	–	7	.750
Marshall	8	–	5	.615	14	–	15	.483
Furman †	7	–	5	.583	19	–	11	.633
Chattanooga	7	–	5	.583	16	–	11	.593
Western Carolina	4	–	8	.333	7	–	19	.269
Davidson	3	–	7	.300	9	–	18	.333
The Citadel	2	–	11	.154	8	–	19	.296
† 1978 Southern Conference tournament winner Rankings from AP Poll

1977–78 Southland Conference men's basketball standings
	Conf.				Overall
Team	W		L	PCT	W		L	PCT
McNeese State	8	–	2	.800	20	–	8	.714
Lamar	8	–	2	.800	18	–	9	.667
Southwestern Louisiana	7	–	3	.700	19	–	8	.704
Texas-Arlington	3	–	7	.300	10	–	17	.370
Arkansas State	2	–	8	.200	9	–	18	.333
Louisiana Tech	2	–	8	.200	6	–	21	.222
Rankings from AP Poll

1977–78 Southwest Conference men's basketball standings
	Conf.				Overall
Team	W		L	PCT	W		L	PCT
No. 5 Arkansas	14	–	2	.875	32	–	4	.889
No. 17 Texas	14	–	2	.875	26	–	5	.839
Houston †	11	–	5	.688	25	–	8	.758
Texas Tech	10	–	6	.625	19	–	10	.655
Baylor	8	–	8	.500	14	–	13	.519
SMU	6	–	10	.375	10	–	18	.357
Texas A&M	5	–	11	.313	12	–	15	.444
Rice	2	–	14	.125	4	–	22	.154
TCU	2	–	14	.125	4	–	22	.154
† 1978 SWC tournament winner Rankings from AP Poll

1977–78 SWAC men's basketball standings
	Conf.				Overall
Team	W		L	PCT	W		L	PCT
Southern	9	–	3	.750	23	–	5	.821
Jackson State	9	–	3	.750	21	–	5	.808
Alcorn State	8	–	4	.667	22	–	7	.759
Texas Southern	7	–	5	.583	16	–	10	.615
Grambling State	3	–	9	.250	10	–	14	.417
Prairie View†		–		–	14	–	13	.519
Mississippi Valley State†*		–		–	15	–	20	.429
† – Played as non-Division I program. * – Overall record adjusted to 16–19. Rankings from AP Poll

1977–78 Sun Belt Conference men's basketball standings
	Conf.				Overall
Team	W		L	PCT	W		L	PCT
UNC Charlotte	9	–	1	.900	20	–	7	.741
New Orleans †	8	–	2	.800	21	–	6	.778
Jacksonville	6	–	4	.600	14	–	14	.500
South Alabama	3	–	7	.300	18	–	10	.643
South Florida	2	–	8	.200	13	–	14	.481
Georgia State	2	–	8	.200	5	–	21	.192
† 1978 Sun Belt Conference tournament winner Rankings from AP Poll

1977–78 West Coast Athletic Conference men's basketball standings
	Conf.				Overall
Team	W		L	PCT	W		L	PCT
No. 11 San Francisco	12	–	2	.857	23	–	6	.793
Nevada	10	–	4	.714	19	–	8	.704
Portland	9	–	6	.600	19	–	8	.704
Santa Clara	9	–	6	.600	21	–	8	.724
Seattle	6	–	8	.429	11	–	16	.407
Saint Mary's	5	–	9	.357	13	–	14	.481
Loyola Marymount	4	–	11	.267	11	–	15	.423
Pepperdine	3	–	12	.200	7	–	19	.269
Rankings from AP Poll

1977–78 WAC men's basketball standings
	Conf.				Overall
Team	W		L	PCT	W		L	PCT
No. 12 New Mexico	13	–	1	.929	24	–	4	.857
No. 14 Utah	12	–	2	.857	23	–	6	.793
Colorado State	8	–	6	.571	18	–	9	.667
Arizona	7	–	8	.467	15	–	11	.577
BYU	6	–	8	.429	12	–	18	.400
Arizona State	6	–	9	.400	13	–	14	.481
Wyoming	3	–	11	.214	12	–	15	.444
UTEP	2	–	12	.143	10	–	16	.385
Rankings from AP Poll

=== Division I independents ===
A total of 78 college teams played as Division I independents. Among them, DePaul (27–3) had both the best winning percentage (.900) and the most wins.

1977–78 NCAA Division I men's basketball independents standings
	Conf.				Overall
Team	W		L	PCT	W		L	PCT
No. 3 DePaul		–		–	27	–	3	.900
No. 18 Detroit		–		–	25	–	4	.862
Illinois State		–		–	24	–	4	.857
No. 8 Marquette		–		–	24	–	4	.857
Pan American		–		–	22	–	4	.846
VCU		–		–	24	–	5	.828
Fairfield		–		–	22	–	5	.815
North Texas State		–		–	22	–	6	.786
Syracuse		–		–	22	–	6	.786
Rhode Island		–		–	24	–	7	.774
Providence		–		–	24	–	8	.750
St. John's		–		–	21	–	7	.750
Utah State		–		–	21	–	7	.750
Georgetown		–		–	23	–	8	.742
No. 6 Notre Dame		–		–	23	–	8	.742
Holy Cross		–		–	20	–	7	.741
Northeast Louisiana		–		–	20	–	7	.741
UNC Wilmington		–		–	19	–	7	.731
St. Bonaventure		–		–	21	–	8	.724
UNLV		–		–	20	–	8	.714
Virginia Tech		–		–	19	–	8	.704
James Madison		–		–	18	–	8	.692
Maine		–		–	17	–	8	.680
Army		–		–	19	–	9	.679
Dayton		–		–	19	–	10	.655
St. Francis (NY)		–		–	16	–	9	.640
Iona		–		–	17	–	10	.630
William & Mary		–		–	16	–	10	.615
Air Force		–		–	15	–	10	.600
Loyola (IL)		–		–	16	–	11	.593
Mercer		–		–	16	–	11	.593
Oklahoma City		–		–	16	–	11	.593
Seton Hall		–		–	16	–	11	.593
Boston College		–		–	15	–	11	.577
Butler		–		–	15	–	11	.577
Saint Francis (PA)		–		–	15	–	11	.577
South Carolina		–		–	16	–	12	.571
Siena		–		–	13	–	10	.565
Navy		–		–	14	–	11	.560
Milwaukee		–		–	15	–	12	.556
Niagara		–		–	14	–	12	.538
Northeastern		–		–	14	–	12	.538
Southern Mississippi		–		–	13	–	12	.520
Portland State		–		–	14	–	13	.519
Stetson		–		–	14	–	13	.519
Oral Roberts		–		–	13	–	14	.481
Xavier		–		–	13	–	14	.481
Cleveland State		–		–	12	–	13	.480
Tennessee State		–		–	11	–	12	.478
Catholic		–		–	12	–	14	.462
Manhattan		–		–	12	–	14	.462
Georgia Southern		–		–	12	–	15	.444
Northwestern State		–		–	12	–	15	.444
Connecticut		–		–	11	–	15	.423
Old Dominion		–		–	11	–	15	.423
Vermont		–		–	11	–	15	.423
Boston University		–		–	10	–	15	.400
Hardin–Simmons		–		–	10	–	16	.385
Campbell		–		–	9	–	15	.375
Centenary (LA)		–		–	10	–	17	.370
Denver		–		–	10	–	17	.370
Colgate		–		–	9	–	17	.346
East Carolina		–		–	9	–	17	.346
Fordham		–		–	8	–	18	.308
Long Island		–		–	8	–	18	.308
Saint Peter's		–		–	8	–	18	.308
Baptist		–		–	8	–	19	.296
Samford		–		–	8	–	19	.296
Canisius		–		–	7	–	19	.269
Houston Baptist		–		–	7	–	19	.269
New Hampshire		–		–	7	–	19	.269
Wagner		–		–	7	–	19	.269
Evansville		–		–	1	–	3	.250
Fairleigh Dickinson		–		–	6	–	18	.250
Valparaiso		–		–	6	–	19	.240
Robert Morris		–		–	4	–	19	.174
Richmond		–		–	4	–	22	.154
Hawaii		–		–	1	–	26	.037
Rankings from AP Poll

=== Informal championships ===
Conference	Regular season winner	Most Valuable Player
New Jersey-New York 7 Conference	Rutgers	None selected

Rutgers finished with a 6–1 record in head-to-head competition among members of the New Jersey-New York 7 Conference.

Conference	Regular season winner	Most Valuable Player
Philadelphia Big 5	Temple & Villanova	Michael Brooks, La Salle

Temple and Villanova both finished with 3–1 records in head-to-head competition among the Philadelphia Big 5.

=== Statistical leaders ===
Points per game			Rebounds per game			Field goal percentage			Free throw percentage		
Player	School	PPG	Player	School	RPG	Player	School	FG%	Player	School	FT%
Freeman Williams	Portland St.	35.9	Ken Williams	N. Texas St.	14.7	Joe Senser	West Chester St.	68.5	Bunny Gibson	Marshall	94.4
Larry Bird	Indiana St.	30.0	Henry Taylor	Pan American	14.2	Mike O'Koren	N. Carolina	64.3	Mark Tucker	Oklahoma St.	91.2
Purvis Short	Jackson St.	29.5	Dean Uthoff	Iowa St.	14.0	Pat Cummings	Cincinnati	64.2	Anthony Williams	Jacksonville	90.9
Oliver Mack	E. Carolina	28.0	Reggie King	Alabama	13.3	Rick Robey	Kentucky	63.5	Brian Appel	Hofstra	90.5
Roger Phegley	Bradley	27.6	Calvin Natt	NE Louisiana	13.2	Mel Daniels	Stetson	63.4	Ron Perry	Holy Cross	90.0

== Post-season tournaments ==
=== NCAA tournament ===
==== Final Four ====
National semifinals
E1	Duke	90
MW2	Notre Dame	86
ME2	Kentucky	64
W2	Arkansas	59

National finals
E1	Duke	88
ME2	Kentucky	94
Third place
MW2	Notre Dame	69
W2	Arkansas	71

=== National Invitation tournament ===
==== Semifinals & finals ====
Semifinals
Georgetown	85
NC State	86
Texas	96
Rutgers	76

Finals
NC State	93
Texas	101
Third place
Georgetown	72
Rutgers	85

== Awards ==
=== Consensus All-American teams ===
Consensus First Team
Player	Position	Class	Team
Butch Lee	G	Senior	Marquette
David Greenwood	F	Junior	UCLA
Larry Bird	F	Senior	Indiana State
Mychal Thompson	C	Senior	Minnesota
Phil Ford	G	Senior	North Carolina

Consensus Second Team
Player	Position	Class	Team
Ron Brewer	G	Senior	Arkansas
Jack Givens	G/F	Senior	Kentucky
Rod Griffin	G	Senior	Wake Forest
Rick Robey	F/C	Senior	Kentucky
Freeman Williams	G	Senior	Portland State

=== Major player of the year awards ===
- Wooden Award: Phil Ford, North Carolina
- Naismith Award: Butch Lee, Marquette
- Helms Player of the Year: Jack Givens, Kentucky
- Associated Press Player of the Year: Butch Lee, Marquette
- UPI Player of the Year: Butch Lee, Marquette
- NABC Player of the Year: Phil Ford, North Carolina
- Oscar Robertson Trophy (USBWA): Phil Ford, North Carolina
- Adolph Rupp Trophy: Butch Lee, Marquette
- Sporting News Player of the Year: Phil Ford, North Carolina

=== Major coach of the year awards ===
- Associated Press Coach of the Year: Eddie Sutton, Arkansas
- Henry Iba Award (USBWA): Ray Meyer, DePaul
- NABC Coach of the Year: Bill Foster, Duke & Abe Lemons, Texas
- UPI Coach of the Year: Eddie Sutton, Arkansas
- Sporting News Coach of the Year: Bill Foster, Duke

=== Other major awards ===
- Frances Pomeroy Naismith Award (Best player under 6'0): Mike Scheib, Susquehanna
- Robert V. Geasey Trophy (Top player in Philadelphia Big 5): Michael Brooks, La Salle
- NIT/Haggerty Award (Top player in New York City metro area): George Johnson, St. John's

== Coaching changes ==
A number of teams changed coaches during the season and after it ended.

Team	Former Coach	Interim Coach	New Coach	Reason
American	Jim Lynam		Gary Williams	
Auburn	Bob Davis		Sonny Smith	Southern Illinois' Paul Lambert was hired as Davis' successor, but he perished in a hotel fire on June 6, 1978 before coaching a game for Auburn. Smith was hired from East Tennessee State to replace Davis and coached the Tigers for 11 seasons.
Boston University	Roy Sigler		Rick Pitino	
Bradley	Joe Stowell		Dick Versace	
Brown	Gerry Alaimo		Joe Mullaney	
California	Dick Edwards		Dick Kuchen	
Baptist	Danny Monk		David Reese	
Cincinnati	Gale Catlett		Ed Badger	Catlett left to coach West Virginia.
Columbia	Tom Penders		Buddy Mahar	
Davidson	Dave Pritchett		Eddie Biedenbach	
Denver	Bill Weimar		Ben Jobe	
Duquesne	John Cinicola		Mike Rice	
East Tennessee State	Sonny Smith		Jim Halihan	Smith left to coach Auburn.
Evansville	Bobby Watson		Dick Walters	Watson, his assistant coaches, and all but one Purple Aces player perished on December 13, 1977 when the plane carrying the team from Evansville to Murfreesboro, Tennessee for a game vs. Middle Tennessee State crashed upon takeoff. Evansville cancelled the remainder of its 1977-78 season.
Florida State	Hugh Durham		Joe Williams	Durham left to coach Georgia.
Furman	Joe Williams		Eddie Holbrook	Williams left for Florida State. Gardner-Webb coach Eddie Holbrook was hired.
Georgia	John Guthrie		Hugh Durham	
Gonzaga	Adrian Buoncristiani		Dan Fitzgerald	
Idaho	Jim Jarvis		Don Monson	
Illinois State	Gene Smithson		Bob Donewald	Smithson left to coach Wichita State.
Indiana State	Bob King		Bill Hodges	
Jacksonville	Don Beasley		Tates Locke	
Kent State	Rex Hughes	Mike Boyd	Ed Douma	
Long Beach State	Dwight Jones		Tex Winter	
Manhattan	John Powers		Brian Mahoney	
Mississippi State	Ron Greene		Jim Hatfield	Greene left to coach his alma mater, Murray State.
Montana	Jim Brandenburg		Mike Montgomery	
Montana State	Rich Juarez		Bruce Haroldson	
Morehead State	Jack Schalow		Wayne Martin	
Murray State	Fred Overton		Ron Greene	
Northern Arizona	John Birkett		Joedy Gardner	
Northwestern	Tex Winter		Rich Falk	
Oregon	Dick Harter		Jim Haney	Harter left to coach Penn State.
Penn State	Johnny Bach		Dick Harter	Bach left to join the coaching staff of the Golden State Warriors.
Portland State	Ken Edwards		Glen Kinney	
Purdue	Fred Schaus		Lee Rose	
Richmond	Carl Slone		Lou Goetz	
Saint Francis (PA)	Pete Lonergan		Dave Magarity	
Saint Joseph's	Harry Booth		Jim Lynam	
Saint Louis	Ron Coleman		Ron Ekker	
San Francisco	Bob Gaillard		Dan Belluomini	
Seattle	Bill O'Connor		Jack Schalow	
Southern Illinois	Paul Lambert		Joe Gottfried	
Southwestern Louisiana	Jim Hatfield		Bobby Paschal	
Tennessee	Cliff Wettig		Don DeVoe	
UC Santa Barbara	Ralph Barkey		Ed DeLacy	
UNC Charlotte	Lee Rose		Mike Pratt	
West Virginia	Joedy Gardner		Gale Catlett	Gardner left to coach Northern Arizona.
Western Kentucky	Jim Richards		Gene Keady	
West Texas A&M	Ron Ekker		Ken Edwards	
Wichita State	Harry Miller		Gene Smithson	
Wyoming	Don DeVoe		Jim Brandenburg	DeVoe left to coach Tennessee.
