= Rick Robey =

American basketball player (born 1956)

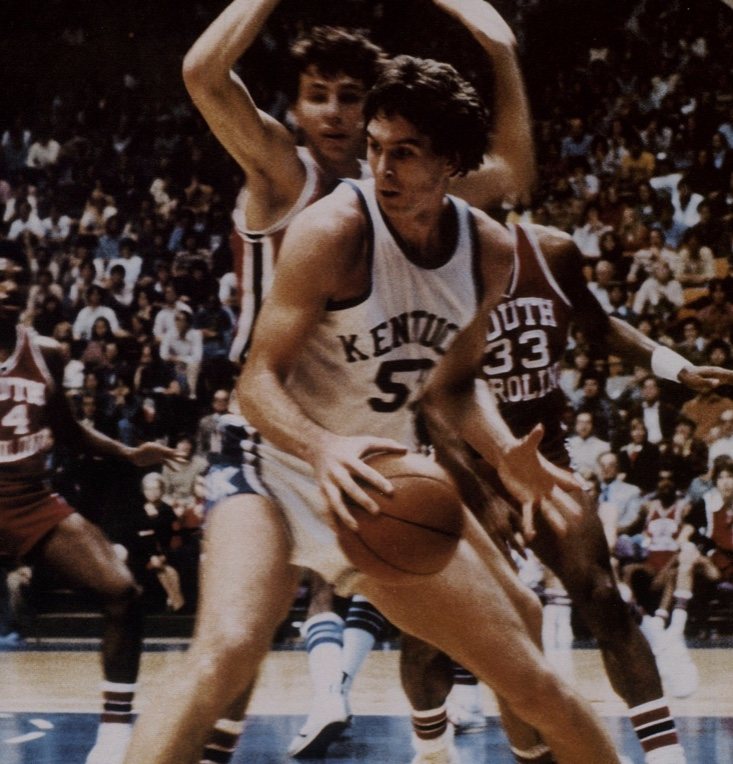
- Robey during his senior season at Kentucky

Personal information
- Born: January 30, 1956 (age 70) Coral Gables, Florida, U.S.
- Listed height: 6 ft 11 in (2.11 m)
- Listed weight: 230 lb (104 kg)

Career information
- High school: Brother Martin (New Orleans, Louisiana)
- College: Kentucky (1974–1978)
- NBA draft: 1978: 1st round, 3rd overall pick
- Drafted by: Indiana Pacers
- Playing career: 1978–1986
- Position: Center
- Number: 53, 8

Career history
- 1978–1979: Indiana Pacers
- 1979–1983: Boston Celtics
- 1983–1986: Phoenix Suns

Career highlights
- NBA champion (1981); NCAA champion (1978); Consensus second-team All-American (1978); 2× First-team All-SEC (1977, 1978); Third-team All-SEC (1975); Third-team Parade All-American (1974)

Career statistics
- Points: 3,723 (7.6 ppg)
- Rebounds: 2,301 (4.7 rpg)
- Assists: 611 (1.2 apg)
- Stats at NBA.com
- Stats at Basketball Reference
Medals
Representing United States
Men's basketball
Pan American Games
Gold medal – first place	1975 Mexico City	Team competition

Frederick Robert Robey (born January 30, 1956) is an American former college and professional basketball player. At 6'11", he played the center position for the Indiana Pacers, Boston Celtics, and the Phoenix Suns of the National Basketball Association (NBA).

== Early life ==
Born in Coral Gables, Florida, Robey's family moved across America as he grew up. Robey remembered "I lived in Coral Gables and Jacksonville, Florida until I was about five, then in Memphis (Tennessee) until I was 8 1/2, in Alaska until I was 11 and in New Orleans ever since".

Robey's interest in basketball started early. The Robey family lived in Kodiak, Alaska for two years where Robey's father worked at the Kodiak Naval Operating Base. His father, Fred Robey was a civilian employee of the US Defense Investigative Service who said Robey's interest in basketball "...started very young, about five or six. He'd say 'Dad, come out and throw the ball to me' and I'd do it. Then he started saying 'Dad, let's go out and shoot baskets' and I'd do that too". Robey started playing basketball in the naval station's gymnasium every day, competing with much older sailors and marines. Robey's father said "they were all so much bigger and better than him that he learned he just had to be aggressive".

== High school career ==
Robey played high school basketball as a center for the Brother Martin High School Crusaders in New Orleans, Louisiana.

While discussing new recruits in 1972, then Brother Martin Crusaders' basketball coach Andy Russo said of Robey "...one is a sophomore, Rick (Robey) is 6' 9" and weighs 215 pounds. He has never played high school ball, but when Marquette was in New Orleans to play Tulane, coach Al McGuire had Rick out to dinner. I don't know how he knew about him, but that's the kind of prospect Rick is. And he (Robey) hasn't even bounced a ball for us, yet."

After joining the team, Robey lost a season due to leaving his home school district. In the year he sat out, Robey said "I grew five inches - up to 6' 10" inches. And I did get to practice and dress for games". Beginning to play as a high school junior, Robey quickly became the team leader in scoring, averaging 16.1 points and 10.5 rebounds per game.

Tom Kolb, Robey's high school coach during his senior year at Brother Martin said "When we got to the state playoffs... the true Rick Robey came out. Over the final five games, he averaged 28 points and 23 rebounds".

During the 1974 Louisiana Top Twenty high school basketball playoffs, Robey was described by Town Talk sports editor William F. "Bill" Carter as "the most awesome basketball player I have seen... Robey does it all... he has learned to shoot the basketball from any spot."

=== Louisiana state championship and accolades ===
As a high school senior, Robey led the Brother Martin Crusaders to win the Louisiana Class AAAA basketball state championship 67–56 over district rival Holy Cross. Robey scored twice in the last 39 seconds of the game, earning a total of 21 points and 18 rebounds during the game. Robey was voted Most Valuable Player of the state AAAA championship game.

Robey was voted Most Valuable Player in Louisiana for scoring 51 points and 38 rebounds during the tournament by the reporters and broadcasters who covered the games. Robey was named the Top Twenty tournament's "Outstanding Player" by the Louisiana Sports Writers Association. Robey was a unanimous selection to the Louisiana All-State basketball team.

=== National honors ===
In 1974 Robey was named to the All American Basketball Squad by Coach & Athlete magazine. Robey was selected to the Orlando Sentinel's Dixie Dozen and All-Southern teams.

Robey was named one of "The Nation's Top 25" high school basketball players by the St. Petersburg Times.

Robey was also selected to All-Star teams by Basketball News, Basketball Weekly and Parade magazine as well as chosen for the Family Weekly College Coaches All-Future team, Sporting News "Super Twenty" team and the Senior Scholastic All-American team.

== Collegiate prospect ==
Robey was chosen as one of 1974's "30 hottest college prospects" by five well regarded college basketball coaches. Coaches Gene Bartow of Memphis State, Don Haskins of the University of Texas at El Paso, Dick "Digger" Phelps of Notre Dame, George Raveling of Washington State and Norm Sloan of North Carolina State selected Robey as one of the six most promising centers in America.

Averaging 19.9 points and 15.9 rebounds per game as a high school senior, it was reported Robey had "college coaches drooling" over the prospect of recruiting him.

== Invitational tournament play ==
=== Kentucky Derby Classic ===
Robey was one of ten national high school basketball stars on the US All Stars team during the 1974 Kentucky Derby Classic held in Louisville, Kentucky's Freedom Hall on April 28, 1974. Robey's team competed against the Kentucky-Indiana team, which featured five Kentucky and five Indiana high school stars. Robey's team's coach was Paul Walker who had been voted 1974 National High School Basketball Coach of the Year. Walker said Robey was "an animal - he's so aggressive, he just beats the heck out of you". Robey scored 16 points and made eight rebounds during the game. Aware Robey would soon sign on at the University of Kentucky, the 14,000 plus fans gave Robey a ten-minute standing ovation when he was introduced.

=== Capital Classic ===
Robey played against the Capital All-Stars team in the first Capital Classic along with his US All-Stars teammates Mike Phillips, Butch Lee and Moses Malone. The match-up, held in the Capital Centre in Landover, Maryland drew a crowd of over 11,000 – an all-star attendance record at that time. Anticipating a small turnout, officials actually sold close to 7,000 walk-up tickets. The Beltway had a reported five-mile traffic backup, delaying the game for more than a half-hour. Malone and Robey combined for 14 points and 26 rebounds to lead the US All-Stars to a 101–82 victory. Capital All-Stars' Kenny Carr said of Malone and Robey “They just beat everybody in the head”.

=== Louisiana All-Star Game ===
Although invited, Robey was not allowed to play in the 1974 Louisiana All-Star game due to a state rule that prohibited athletes from competing in more than one All-Star game. Robey had already participated in two and thus was ineligible to play. Tom Kolb, Robey's high school coach (who would have coached him in the All-Star game) defending Robey's decision to play in the other tournaments, saying "Can you blame him (Robey)? He wants to know how good he is and the only way he's gonna find out is to play against the best players in the nation. So that's what he did".

=== Pan American Games ===
Robey won gold as a member of the 1975 Pan American Games when he was just 19.

== College career ==
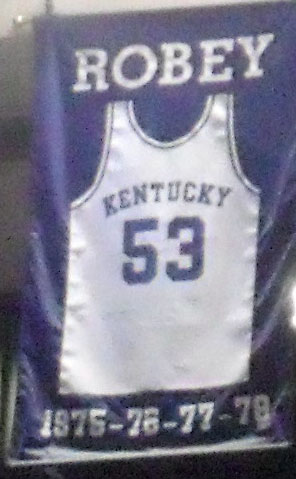
A jersey honoring Robey hangs in Rupp Arena

Robey, then ranked fifth in the nation, estimated 210 college basketball programs had approached him to join their teams. The media closely followed Robey as he narrowed his choice of teams for his college basketball career. In early 1974, it was reported that Robey would choose either Tulane University, the University of Florida or the University of Kentucky.

In April, 1974 Robey chose UK, accepting a scholarship offered by Coach Joe B. Hall. Hall also recruited Jack Givens, James Lee and Mike Phillips to 1974 UK lineup. Robey and Phillips were often referred to as "the Twin Towers" while playing together at UK. Robey said his decision was influenced by Kentucky's love of basketball. "I felt the coaches here were really good people and of course the fans are tremendous".

Coach Hall was pleased with Robey's performance at UK saying "...Rick is not the kind of guy who pouts. He took the elbows, smiled and learned his lessons".

Robey was a member of UK's 1974–1975 team that was the 1975 NCAA Championship Runner Up and UK's 1977–1978 team that won the 1978 NCAA Championship.

=== 1978 NCAA Championship ===
While Kentucky's 1978 championship 94–88 win against the Duke Blue Devils is often remembered for Jack Givens' 41-point outburst, Sports Illustrated magazine said Robey "made the most spectacular play of the game. With 7:39 to go, (UK Coach Joe B.) Hall charged onto the court during a brief stop in play to chide Robey for some indiscretion. Seconds later Robey responded by grabbing a missed shot and jamming it into the basket in one motion". During the championship game, Robey shot 8 of 11 from the floor, scored 20 points and led the team with 11 Kentucky rebounds.

While a student at UK, Robey was a member of Delta Tau Delta fraternity, along with fellow UK star Mike Phillips.

== Professional career ==
Robey was the third overall pick in the 1978 NBA draft, selected by the Indiana Pacers. Halfway through his rookie season, Robey was traded to the Celtics for former ABA All-Star Billy Knight.

Robey played eight seasons (1978–86) in the National Basketball Association. After being a member of the Indiana Pacers and Boston Celtics, he was traded to the Phoenix Suns before the 1983–84 season in exchange for Dennis Johnson. He scored 3,723 points in his career and was a member of the 1981 Celtics championship team.

== NBA career statistics ==
Legend
GP	Games played	GS	Games started	MPG	Minutes per game
FG%	Field goal percentage	3P%	3-point field goal percentage	FT%	Free throw percentage
RPG	Rebounds per game	APG	Assists per game	SPG	Steals per game
BPG	Blocks per game	PPG	Points per game	**Bold**	Career high

=== Regular season ===
Year	Team	GP	GS	MPG	FG%	3P%	FT%	RPG	APG	SPG	BPG	PPG
1978–79	Indiana	43	−	19.7	.475	—	.744	5.9	1.2	**0.6**	**0.3**	8.6
1978–79	Boston	36	−	**25.4**	.481	—	**.816**	**7.2**	**2.2**	**0.6**	0.1	**12.4**
1979–80	Boston	**82**	**27**	23.4	.521	.000	.684	6.5	1.1	**0.6**	0.2	11.5
1980–81†	Boston	**82**	4	19.1	**.545**	.000	.574	4.8	1.5	0.5	0.2	9.0
1981–82	Boston	80	4	14.8	.493	.000	.535	3.7	0.9	0.3	0.2	5.7
1982–83	Boston	59	6	14.5	.467	—	.577	3.7	1.1	0.2	0.1	4.2
1983–84	Phoenix	61	4	14.0	**.545**	**1.000**	.693	3.2	1.1	0.3	0.2	5.6
1984–85	Phoenix	4	0	12.0	.222	—	.500	2.0	1.3	0.5	0.0	1.3
1985–86	Phoenix	46	1	13.7	.377	.000	.688	3.2	1.3	0.4	0.1	3.8
Career		493	46	17.9	.501	—	.650	4.7	1.2	0.4	0.2	7.6

=== Playoff statistics ===
Year	Team	GP	GS	MPG	FG%	3P%	FT%	RPG	APG	SPG	BPG	PPG
1980	Boston	9	—	**16.8**	.453	.000	.500	**3.6**	**1.1**	**0.8**	**0.3**	**6.1**
1981†	Boston	**17**	—	15.6	.432	—	.457	3.5	0.7	0.1	**0.3**	5.1
1982	Boston	12	—	10.2	**.525**	—	**.765**	2.4	0.3	0.2	**0.3**	4.6
1983	Boston	5	—	5.8	.000	.000	.500	1.6	0.2	0.0	0.0	0.4
1984	Phoenix	10	—	4.3	.438	.000	.500	1.0	0.2	0.2	0.0	1.8
Career		53	—	3.7	.448	.000	.538	2.6	0.5	0.2	0.2	4.1

== Career after retirement from pro sports ==
Robey returned to the Louisville area after his pro career and became a real estate broker. Robey now has his own real estate team at EXP Louisville.

Robey's son Sam played on the offensive line for the University of Florida football team.
