= 1977–78 Auburn Tigers men's basketball team =

American college basketball season

1977–78 Auburn Tigers men's basketball

Marshall Memorial Invitational champions
- Conference: Southeastern Conference
- Record: 13–14 (8–10 SEC)
- Head coach: Bob Davis (5th season)
- Captains: Mike Mitchell; Stan Pietkiewicz; Myles Patrick
- Home arena: Memorial Coliseum

1977–78 Southeastern Conference men's basketball standings
| | Conf. | | | | Overall |
| Team | W | | L | PCT | W | | L | PCT |
|---|---|---|---|---|---|---|---|---|
| No. 1 Kentucky | 16 | – | 2 | .889 | 30 | – | 2 | .938 |
| Mississippi State | 13 | – | 5 | .722 | 18 | – | 9 | .667 |
| LSU | 12 | – | 6 | .667 | 18 | – | 9 | .667 |
| Alabama | 11 | – | 7 | .611 | 17 | – | 10 | .630 |
| Florida | 8 | – | 10 | .444 | 15 | – | 12 | .556 |
| Auburn | 8 | – | 10 | .444 | 13 | – | 14 | .481 |
| Tennessee | 6 | – | 12 | .333 | 11 | – | 16 | .407 |
| Vanderbilt | 6 | – | 12 | .333 | 10 | – | 17 | .370 |
| Georgia | 5 | – | 13 | .278 | 11 | – | 16 | .407 |
| Ole Miss | 5 | – | 13 | .278 | 10 | – | 17 | .370 |
Rankings from AP Poll

The 1977–78 Auburn Tigers men's basketball team represented Auburn University in the 1977–78 college basketball season. The team's head coach was Bob Davis, who was in his fifth season at Auburn. The team played their home games at Memorial Coliseum in Auburn, Alabama. They finished the season 13–14, 8–10 in SEC play.

After the season, Davis retired from coaching and Paul Lambert from Southern Illinois University was hired as his replacement. However, Lambert died in a hotel fire on June 6, 1978 before ever coaching a game for the Tigers.
