= Norm Sloan =

American basketball player and coach (1926–2003)

- Sloan as the head coach of the Florida Gators men's basketball team, c. 1961

Biographical details
- Born: June 25, 1926; Anderson, Indiana, U.S.
- Died: December 9, 2003 (aged 77); Durham, North Carolina, U.S.

Playing career

Basketball
- 1946–1949: NC State

Football
- 1948–1950: NC State
- Positions: Guard (basketball); Quarterback (football)

Coaching career (HC unless noted)

Basketball
- 1951–1955: Presbyterian
- 1955–1956: Memphis State (assistant)
- 1956–1960: The Citadel
- 1960–1966: Florida
- 1966–1980: NC State
- 1980–1989: Florida

Football
- 1951: Presbyterian (assistant)

Track
- 1955: Memphis State

Head coaching record
- Overall: 627–395 (basketball)

Accomplishments and honors

Championships
- NCAA champion (1974); 3× ACC tournament (1970, 1973, 1974); 2× ACC regular season (1973, 1974); SEC regular season (1989)

Awards
- SoCon Coach of the Year (1957); SEC Coach of the Year (1961); 3× ACC Coach of the Year (1970, 1973, 1974)

Norman Leslie Sloan Jr. (June 25, 1926 – December 9, 2003) was an American college basketball player and coach. Sloan was a native of Indiana and played college basketball and football at North Carolina State University. He began a long career as a basketball coach months after graduating from college in 1951, and he was the men's basketball head coach at Presbyterian College, The Citadel, North Carolina State University, and two stints at the University of Florida. Over a career that spanned 38 seasons, Sloan was named conference coach of the year five times and won the 1974 national championship at North Carolina State, his alma mater. He was nicknamed "Stormin' Norman" due to his combative nature with the media, his players, and school administrators, and his collegiate coaching career ended in controversy when Florida's basketball program was under investigation in 1989, though Sloan claimed that he was treated unfairly.

== Early years ==
Sloan was born in Anderson, Indiana, in 1926 to Norman and Mary Sloan. He attended Lawrence Central High School in Indianapolis, where he lettered in basketball.

== College playing career ==
Sloan received an athletic scholarship to attend North Carolina State University in Raleigh, North Carolina, where he played guard for coach Everett Case's NC State Wolfpack from 1946 to 1949. He was one of Case's original six "Hoosier Hotshots," a group of high school stars Case recruited from Indiana. As a member of the Wolfpack, Sloan was a classmate and teammate of Vic Bubas, who later coached the Duke Blue Devils from 1959 to 1969. Sloan was a member of three Wolfpack teams that won Southern Conference championships in 1947, 1948 and 1949. During the fall semesters, he played on the NC State Wolfpack football team as a reserve quarterback and was a member of the school's track and field team.

Sloan quit the basketball team before his senior year (1950–51) due to an ongoing dispute with Case over playing time. On the football field, he became the backup to starting quarterback Ed Mooney and appeared in most games under coach Beattie Feathers. Sloan graduated from NC State with a bachelor's degree in education in 1951.

== Coaching career ==
=== Presbyterian ===
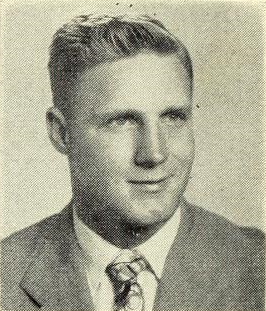
Sloan at Presbyterian College, c. 1952

Soon after graduating from NC State in 1951, Sloan was hired at Presbyterian College in Clinton, South Carolina, to be the school's head basketball coach and an assistant football coach starting with the 1951 fall semester. He led the basketball team from 1951 to 1955, and his Presbyterian Blue Hose men's basketball teams compiled a 69–36 record in four seasons, including conference championships and berths in the NAIA Men's Basketball Championship Tournament in his first and last seasons at the school.

=== Memphis State (assistant) ===
Sloan left for Memphis State University in 1955 to serve as an assistant for the Memphis Tigers under head coach Eugene Lambert. The Tigers went 20–7 during Sloan's single season at the school and earned the program's first berth in the NCAA tournament.

=== The Citadel ===
In 1956, Sloan was named the head coach at The Citadel in Charleston, South Carolina to take over a basketball program which had won a total of two games over the previous two seasons. His first Bulldogs team in 1957 went 11–14 and won the George Mikan Award for Most Improved Team in the Nation, and Sloan was named the coach of the year by the South Carolina Sportswriters Association. The Citadel posted winning seasons over the next three years and made their first appearance in the Southern Conference championship game in 1959. Sloan's overall record at the school was 57–38.

=== Florida ===
In 1960, Sloan was hired as the first full-time basketball coach at the University of Florida. Previously, an assistant football coach had usually been assigned to coach basketball due to UF's lack of emphasis on the sport up to that time. His Florida Gators men's basketball teams tallied an 85–63 record in six seasons, including the school's first victory over an Adolph Rupp-coached Kentucky Wildcats team in 1965. He was unable to get the Gators into postseason play during this time; during the 1960s, only one team per conference was guaranteed an NCAA bid. Nonetheless, he built a foundation for Florida's basketball program. According to Florida historian Norm Carlson, Florida basketball had been "essentially an intramural program playing at the intercollegiate level" for most of the time before Sloan arrived. The Miami Herald dubbed Sloan the "father of UF hoops" for his achievements in the 1960s.

=== North Carolina State ===
Sloan was named head coach at his alma mater, North Carolina State, in 1966, and his NC State Wolfpack basketball teams won three Atlantic Coast Conference (ACC) Championships in 1970, 1973 and 1974. His 1973 Wolfpack team was undefeated (27–0) but missed that year's NCAA tournament due to questions about the recruiting of high school phenomenon David Thompson. A year later, he led the Wolfpack to a 30–1 record and the school's first NCAA national championship. En route, the Wolfpack defeated the UCLA Bruins in the NCAA Final Four, ending UCLA coach John Wooden's run of seven straight NCAA championships. Sloan's Wolfpack beat Marquette, 76–64, in the 1974 NCAA championship game.

Sloan's overall win–loss record at NC State was 266–127 in 14 seasons. His greatest teams included legendary players such as Thompson, Tommy Burleson, Moe Rivers, Tim Stoddard (who went on to pitch in Major League Baseball), Kenny Carr, and Monte Towe. "Stormin' Norman" was as well known for his garish red-and-white plaid sports coat as he was for his ACC battles with Lefty Driesell at Maryland and Dean Smith at North Carolina. He was selected the National Coach of the Year in 1973 by Basketball Weekly, and again in 1974 by the USBWA and the Associated Press.

=== Great Britain national team ===
Sloan was named head coach of the Great Britain men's national basketball team ahead of the 1980 Olympic qualifying campaign. Sloan, who had just been rehired by the University of Florida, hosted a month-long training camp for the Great Britain national team on Florida's campus in Gainesville. He then took the team to England for a series of preparation games against Finland and Belgium before competing in the Vienna Tournament in Austria and the European Olympic Qualifying Tournament in Switzerland. Great Britain finished Olympic Qualifying with a 1–3 record and a 5–6 (.455) overall international record for the summer. Sloan was succeeded as the Great Britain National Team head coach by Tom Schneeman.

=== Return to Florida ===
A salary dispute with the athletic director at NC State caused Sloan to leave the school, and the construction of the modern O'Connell Center basketball arena at the University of Florida helped convince Sloan to return to Gainesville in 1980. After three losing seasons, he turned the Florida Gators basketball program around for a second time, primarily by convincing several top in-state high school recruits such as Vernon Maxwell and Dwayne Schintzius to attend college at Florida. From 1984 through 1989, Sloan's Gators posted winning records in six straight campaigns and made the first six postseason tournament appearances in program history when they were invited to the NIT Tournament in 1984, 1985, and 1986 and the NCAA Tournament 1987, 1988, and 1989. Sloan's last three squads each won over 20 games, which had previously been accomplished only once at Florida, and his final team won the school's first Southeastern Conference regular season basketball championship.

Sloan compiled a 150–131 record over nine seasons in his second stint at Florida, giving him an overall record of 235–194 in 15 years with the Gators.

==== Resignation ====
Sloan had already planned to retire at the end of the 1989–90 season. However, he was forced to retire on October 31, 1989, just days before the start of the season, in the wake of an NCAA investigation into the Gators program.

In September 1990, the NCAA imposed two years' probation on the Gators for violations dating back to 1985 under Sloan. The Gators' 1987 and 1988 NCAA Tournament appearances were erased from the record books due to Maxwell being retroactively declared ineligible; Maxwell had admitted to taking money from agents without Sloan's knowledge. Sloan had also purchased a plane ticket to Boston for Maxwell in the summer of 1987 so that Maxwell could serve as a counselor at a basketball camp. Two years earlier, one of Sloan's assistants had allowed a recruit's mother to use the return leg of the recruit's airline ticket to return home after the recruit enrolled in summer school. In the NCAA's view, this amounted to the university paying for the travel expenses of recruits and players. It also harshly criticized Sloan, finding that he had engaged in unethical conduct by paying Maxwell's airfare. The basketball program lost two scholarships in 1991-92 and one scholarship in 1992-93 because of the infractions. As severe as these penalties were, the NCAA said it would have imposed even harsher penalties, such as a ban from postseason play and live television in 1990–91, had Sloan not been forced out. Sloan was personally penalized with a five-year show-cause penalty, which had the effect of blackballing him from the collegiate coaching ranks until 1995 at the earliest.

Later, Sloan stated that the situation was "mishandled". In a 1990 interview, Sloan stated his belief that UF athletic director Bill Arnsparger and other university officials "panicked" over relatively minor issues in the basketball program due to recent major violations in other sports. In particular, Florida's football team had been placed on NCAA probation twice in the 1980s; football coach Galen Hall had been forced to resign after the second case. According to Sloan, administrators feared being hit with a "death penalty" if another sport were to be found guilty for major violations. Under NCAA rules, if a school is placed on probation twice in five years, the sport involved in the second violation faces having at least one season canceled. Sloan believed the prospect of such a severe penalty caused Arnsparger and other administrators to overreact and force him out. He also claimed that the university's athletic compliance office was partially to blame for his "unconscious" violations of NCAA travel rules because his requests "went through the channels of athletic administration at the university unquestioned." Overall, he said, "The findings certainly don`t justify what has happened... My reputation was completely destroyed and the careers of two young, promising assistants (Monte Towe and Kenny McCraney, who were also forced to resign) were destroyed. That`s tragic, and the university worked hard at getting it done."

=== Awards and accomplishments ===
Sloan's career win–loss record was 627–395, and his victory total ranks him twenty-sixth on the career list of Division I coaches. His 266 wins at NC State are still second in NC State history, trailing only Case. His 235 wins at Florida (232 if vacated games aren't counted) were the best in Florida history until Billy Donovan surpassed him in 2006.

Sloan was inducted into the Indiana Basketball Hall of Fame in 1984, the North Carolina Sports Hall of Fame in 1994, the Citadel Athletic Hall of Fame in 2002, and the North Carolina State University Athletic Hall of Fame in 2013.

== After coaching ==
Sloan coached briefly in Greece after leaving Florida, then he retired in Raleigh, North Carolina. He died of complications related to pulmonary fibrosis on December 9, 2003, at Duke University Medical Center in Durham, North Carolina. He was survived by his wife Joan, son Mike, and daughters Leslie and Debbie.

== Head coaching record ==
=== Basketball ===
Record table
Season	Team	Overall	Conference	Standing	Postseason
Presbyterian Blue Hose (Little Four) (1951–1955)
1951–52	Presbyterian	21–7	4–2		
1952–53	Presbyterian	11–15	4–2		
1953–54	Presbyterian	17–8	4–2		
1954–55	Presbyterian	20–6	6–0		
Presbyterian:		69–36 (.657)	18–6 (.750)		
The Citadel Bulldogs (Southern Conference) (1957–1960)
1956–57	The Citadel	11–14	5–9	7th	
1957–58	The Citadel	16–11	9–6	4th	
1958–59	The Citadel	15–5	7–4	3rd	
1959–60	The Citadel	15–8	8–4	3rd	
The Citadel:		57–38 (.600)	29–23 (.558)		
Florida Gators (Southeastern Conference) (1960–1966)
1960–61	Florida	15–11	9–5	4th	
1961–62	Florida	12–11	8–6	4th	
1962–63	Florida	12–14	5–9	T–8th	
1963–64	Florida	12–10	6–8	T–9th	
1964–65	Florida	18–7	11–5	T–3rd	
1965–66	Florida	16–10	9–7	T–5th	
NC State Wolfpack (Atlantic Coast Conference) (1966–1980)
1966–67	NC State	7–19	2–12	8th	
1967–68	NC State	16–10	9–5	T–3rd	
1968–69	NC State	15–10	8–6	T–3rd	
1969–70	NC State	23–7	9–5	T–2nd	NCAA Regional Third Place
1970–71	NC State	13–14	5–9	T–6th	
1971–72	NC State	16–10	6–6	T–4th	
1972–73	NC State	27–0	12–0	1st	Ineligible*
1973–74	NC State	30–1	12–0	1st	NCAA Division I Champion
1974–75	NC State	22–6	8–4	T–2nd	
1975–76	NC State	21–9	7–5	T–2nd	NIT semifinal
1976–77	NC State	17–11	6–6	5th	
1977–78	NC State	21–10	7–5	T–2nd	NIT Runner-up
1978–79	NC State	18–12	3–9	T–6th	
1979–80	NC State	20–8	9–5	T–2nd	NCAA Division I Second Round
NC State:		266–127 (.677)	103–77 (.572)		
Florida Gators (Southeastern Conference) (1980–1989)
1980–81	Florida	12–16	5–13	8th	
1981–82	Florida	5–22	2–16	10th	
1982–83	Florida	13–18	5–13	10th	
1983–84	Florida	16–13	11–7	T–3rd	NIT First Round
1984–85	Florida	18–12	9–9	T–5th	NIT First Round
1985–86	Florida	19–14	10–8	4th	NIT semifinal
1986–87	Florida	23–11**	12–6	2nd	NCAA Division I Sweet 16**
1987–88	Florida	23–12**	11–7	T–2nd	NCAA Division I Round of 32**
1988–89	Florida	21–13	13–5	1st	NCAA Division I Round of 64
Florida:		235–194 (.548)	126–124 (.504)		
Total:		624–393 (.614)			
National champion Postseason invitational champion Conference regular season champion Conference regular season and conference tournament champion Division regular season champion Division regular season and conference tournament champion Conference tournament champion

* ^^{a} NC State was ineligible for the NCAA Tournament in 1973 due to violations relating to the recruitment of David Thompson.

** ^^{a} ^{b}^{c}^{d} NCAA appearances in 1987 and 1988 were subsequently vacated due to Vernon Maxwell being declared ineligible. Official record for 1986-87 is 21–10, official record for 1987-88 is 22–11.

== See also ==
- The Citadel Bulldogs
- Florida Gators
- History of the University of Florida
- List of college men's basketball coaches with 600 wins
- List of NCAA Division I Men's Final Four appearances by coach
- List of North Carolina State University people
- NC State Wolfpack
- University Athletic Association
- Hotel Roosevelt fire

== Bibliography ==
- Dortch, Chris, String Music: Inside the Rise of SEC Basketball, Brassey's, Inc., Dulles, Virginia (2002). ISBN 1-57488-439-5.
- Koss, Bill, Pond Birds: Gator Basketball, The Whole Story From The Inside, Fast Break Press, Gainesville, Florida (1996). ISBN 978-0-8130-1523-1.
- Peeler, Tim, Legends of NC State Basketball, Sports Publishing L.L.C., Champaign, Illinois (2004). ISBN 1-58261-820-8.
