= 1978 NCAA Division I basketball championship game =

1978 NCAA Tournament Championship Game
National championship game
Duke Blue Devils	Kentucky Wildcats
ACC	SEC
(27–6)	(29–2)
88	94
Head coach: Bill Foster	Head coach: Joe B. Hall
- AP: 7
- Coaches: 9
- AP: 1
- Coaches: 1
	1st half	2nd half	Total
Duke Blue Devils	38	50	88
Kentucky Wildcats	45	49	94
- Date: March 27, 1978
- Venue: The Checkerdome, St. Louis, Missouri
- MVP: Jack Givens, Kentucky
- Favorite: Kentucky
- Attendance: 18,721

United States TV coverage
- Network: NBC
- Announcers: Dick Enberg (play-by-play); Billy Packer and Al McGuire (color)

The 1978 NCAA Division I Basketball Championship Game was the final round of the 1978 NCAA Division I Basketball Tournament and it determined the national champion for the 1977–78 NCAA Division I season. The game was played on March 27, 1978, at The Checkerdome in St. Louis, and featured the Mideast Regional Champion, Kentucky and the East Regional Champion, Duke.

== Participating teams ==
=== Duke Blue Devils ===
- East
  - Duke 63, Rhode Island 62
  - Duke 84, Pennsylvania 80
  - Duke 90, Villanova 72
- Final Four
  - Duke 90, Notre Dame 86

=== Kentucky Wildcats ===
- Mideast
  - Kentucky 85, Florida State 76
  - Kentucky 91, Miami (OH) 69
  - Kentucky 52, Michigan State 49
- Final Four
  - Kentucky 64, Arkansas 59

== Box score ==
NBC

March 27, 1978

Box/Recap

#7 Duke Blue Devils 88, #1 Kentucky Wildcats 94
Scoring by half: 38–45, 50–49
Pts: Banks 22; Rebs: Gminski 12	Pts: Givens 41; Rebs: Robey 11

The Checkerdome, St. Louis, Missouri
Attendance: 18,721
