= 1978 Sun Belt Conference men's basketball tournament =

- Classification: Division I
- Season: 1977–78
- Teams: 6
- Site: Charlotte Coliseum; Charlotte, NC
- Champions: New Orleans (1st title)
- Winning coach: Butch van Breda Kolff (1st title)
- MVP: Nate Mills (New Orleans)

1977–78 Sun Belt Conference men's basketball standings
	Conf.				Overall
Team	W		L	PCT	W		L	PCT
UNC Charlotte	9	–	1	.900	20	–	7	.741
New Orleans †	8	–	2	.800	21	–	6	.778
Jacksonville	6	–	4	.600	14	–	14	.500
South Alabama	3	–	7	.300	18	–	10	.643
South Florida	2	–	8	.200	13	–	14	.481
Georgia State	2	–	8	.200	5	–	21	.192
† 1978 Sun Belt Conference tournament winner Rankings from AP Poll

The 1978 Sun Belt Conference men's basketball tournament was held February 24–26 at the Charlotte Coliseum in Charlotte, North Carolina.

New Orleans defeated South Alabama in the championship game, 22–20, to win their first Sun Belt men's basketball tournament.

However, no Sun Belt teams were invited to the 1978 NCAA tournament.

== Format ==
All six of the conference's members participated in the tournament field. They were seeded based on regular season conference records with the top two teams earning byes to the semifinal round.

The tournament was played at the Charlotte Coliseum in Charlotte, North Carolina.

== Bracket ==
Quarterfinals; Friday, February 24
5	South Florida	75
4	South Alabama	80
3	Jacksonville	82
6	Georgia State	77

Semifinals; Saturday, February 25
1	UNC Charlotte	56
4	South Alabama	66
2	New Orleans	79
3	Jacksonville	64

Championship; Sunday, February 26
4	South Alabama	20
2	New Orleans	22
