= James Lee (basketball) =

American basketball player

Personal information
- Born: January 17, 1956 (age 70) Lexington, Kentucky, U.S.
- Listed height: 6 ft 5 in (1.96 m)
- Listed weight: 230 lb (104 kg)

Career information
- High school: Henry Clay (Lexington, Kentucky)
- College: Kentucky (1974–1978)
- NBA draft: 1978: 2nd round, 39th overall pick
- Drafted by: Seattle SuperSonics
- Position: Small forward

Career history
- 1978–1979: Tucson Gunners
- 1980–1981: Lehigh Valley Jets
- 1981–1982: Maine Lumberjacks
- 1982–1983: Lancaster Lightning
- 1983–1984: Louisville Catbirds

Career highlights
- NCAA champion (1978)
- Stats at Basketball Reference

James Lee (born January 17, 1956) is a retired American basketball player. He won an NCAA championship at the University of Kentucky and was a second-round draft pick in the 1978 NBA draft.

Lee, a 6'5" swingman from Henry Clay High School in Lexington, Kentucky, played college basketball for his hometown Kentucky Wildcats. He was a key player for four years and averaged 11.3 points per game on 56% shooting as the sixth man on the Wildcats' 1978 national championship team.

Coming off a championship year, Lee was drafted in the second round of the 1978 NBA Draft (39th pick overall) by the Seattle SuperSonics, but never played in the NBA. Lee played for the Western Basketball Association's Tucson Gunners for one season, then played several years in the Continental Basketball Association. His best year came during the 1980–81 CBA season where Lee averaged 22.3 points per game for the Lehigh Valley Jets.
