= 1977–78 NC State Wolfpack men's basketball team =

American college basketball season

1977–78 NC State Wolfpack men's basketball

NIT, Runner-Up
- Conference: Atlantic Coast Conference
- Record: 21–10 (7–5 ACC)
- Head coach: Norm Sloan (12th season)
- Home arena: Reynolds Coliseum

1977–78 ACC men's basketball standings
	Conf.				Overall
Team	W		L	PCT	W		L	PCT
No. 16 North Carolina	9	–	3	.750	23	–	8	.742
No. 7 Duke †	8	–	4	.667	27	–	7	.794
NC State	7	–	5	.583	21	–	10	.677
Virginia	6	–	6	.500	20	–	8	.714
Wake Forest	6	–	6	.500	19	–	10	.655
Maryland	3	–	9	.250	15	–	13	.536
Clemson	3	–	9	.250	15	–	12	.556
† 1978 ACC tournament winner Rankings from AP Poll

The 1977–78 NC State Wolfpack men's basketball team represented North Carolina State University as a member of the Atlantic Coast Conference during the 1977–78 men's college basketball season. Led by head coach Norm Sloan, in his 12th season at NC State, the Wolfpack played their home games at Reynolds Coliseum in Raleigh, North Carolina.

== Roster ==
1979–80 NC State Wolfpack men's basketball team
Players
Coaches

Pos.	#	Name	Height	Weight	Year	Hometown
G	3	Clyde Austin	6 ft 2 in (1.88 m)	150 lb (68 kg)	So	Richmond, Virginia
F	33	Art Jones	6 ft 7 in (2.01 m)	181 lb (82 kg)	Fr	Hampton, Virginia
G	34	Kenny Matthews	6 ft 4 in (1.93 m)	200 lb (91 kg)	Fr	Washington, D.C.
C	42	Craig Watts	7 ft 0 in (2.13 m)	221 lb (100 kg)	Fr	South Easton, Massachusetts
F	43	Hawkeye Whitney	6 ft 5 in (1.96 m)	213 lb (97 kg)	So	Washington, D.C.
G	45	Donnie Perkins	6 ft 3 in (1.91 m)	189 lb (86 kg)	Fr	Bethel, North Carolina

Head coach

- Norm Sloan (NC State)

Assistant coach(es)

Legend

- (C) Team captain
- (S) Suspended
- (I) Ineligible
- (W) Walk-on
- Injured
- Current redshirt

== Schedule ==
Date time, TV	Rank^{#}	Opponent^{#}	Result	Record	Site city, state
Regular season
Nov 26, 1977*		Appalachian State	W 97–79	1–0	Reynolds Coliseum; Raleigh, North Carolina
Nov 28, 1977*		Georgia Southern	W 98–89	2–0	Reynolds Coliseum; Raleigh, North Carolina
Dec 2, 1977*		vs. No. 18 Wake Forest; Big Four Tournament	W 79–77	3–0	Greensboro Coliseum; Greensboro, North Carolina
Dec 3, 1977*		vs. No. 2 North Carolina; Big Four Tournament	L 82–87	3–1	Greensboro Coliseum (15,564); Greensboro, North Carolina
Dec 7, 1977*		at Davidson	W 104–94	4–1	Johnston Gym; Davidson, North Carolina
Dec 10, 1977*		at Penn State	W 79–60	5–1	Rec Hall; University Park, Pennsylvania
Dec 17, 1977*		East Carolina	W 106–80	6–1	Reynolds Coliseum; Raleigh, North Carolina
Dec 28, 1977*		Saint Joseph's	W 70–61	7–1	Reynolds Coliseum; Raleigh, North Carolina
Dec 29, 1977*		Duquesne	W 105–80	8–1	Reynolds Coliseum; Raleigh, North Carolina
Jan 4, 1978*		Biscayne	W 76–42	9–1	Reynolds Coliseum; Raleigh, North Carolina
Jan 7, 1978		Duke	W 74–50	10–1 (1–0)	Reynolds Coliseum; Raleigh, North Carolina
Jan 11, 1978		Maryland	W 88–82	11–1 (2–0)	Reynolds Coliseum; Raleigh, North Carolina
Jan 14, 1978		No. 15 Virginia	L 68–74	11–2 (2–1)	Reynolds Coliseum; Raleigh, North Carolina
Jan 18, 1978		at No. 5 North Carolina; Rivalry	L 64–69	11–3 (2–2)	Carmichael Auditorium (10,000); Chapel Hill, North Carolina
Jan 21, 1978*		Iona	W 99–72	12–3	Reynolds Coliseum; Raleigh, North Carolina
Jan 25, 1978		at Maryland	W 80–73	13–3 (3–2)	Cole Field House; College Park, Maryland
Jan 28, 1978		No. 18 Virginia	L 73–81 ^{OT}	13–4 (3–3)	University Hall; Charlottesville, Virginia
Jan 31, 1978		Clemson	W 73–69	14–4 (4–3)	Reynolds Coliseum; Raleigh, North Carolina
Feb 3, 1978*		vs. Virginia Tech; North-South Doubleheader	W 83–68	15–4	Charlotte Coliseum; Charlotte, North Carolina
Feb 4, 1978*		vs. Furman; North-South Doubleheader	L 67–68	15–5	Charlotte Coliseum; Charlotte, North Carolina
Feb 11, 1978		No. 14 Wake Forest	W 88–77	16–5 (5–3)	Reynolds Coliseum; Raleigh, North Carolina
Feb 15, 1978		No. 20 Duke	L 64–76	16–6 (5–4)	Cameron Indoor Stadium; Durham, North Carolina
Feb 18, 1978		at Clemson	W 72–65	17–6 (6–4)	Littlejohn Coliseum; Clemson, South Carolina
Feb 21, 1978*		at No. 9 Notre Dame	L 59–70	17–7	Joyce Center; Notre Dame, Indiana
Feb 23, 1978		No. 8 North Carolina	W 72–67	18–7 (7–4)	Reynolds Coliseum (12,400); Raleigh, North Carolina
Feb 25, 1978		at Wake Forest	L 81–87	18–8 (7–5)	Winston-Salem War Memorial Coliseum; Winston-Salem, North Carolina
ACC tournament
Mar 1, 1978*	(3)	vs. (6) Maryland; Quarterfinals	L 108–109 ^{3OT}	18–9	Greensboro Coliseum; Greensboro, North Carolina
NIT
Mar 10, 1978*		South Carolina; First round	W 82–70	19–9	Reynolds Coliseum; Raleigh, North Carolina
Mar 14, 1978*		No. 18 Detroit; Quarterfinals	W 84–77	20–9	Reynolds Coliseum; Raleigh, North Carolina
Mar 19, 1978*		vs. Georgetown; Semifinals	W 86–85 ^{OT}	21–9	Madison Square Garden; New York, New York
Mar 21, 1978*		vs. No. 17 Texas; Finals	L 93–101	21–10	Madison Square Garden; New York, New York
*Non-conference game. ^{#}Rankings from AP Poll. (#) Tournament seedings in parentheses. E=East. All times are in Eastern Time.
