= 1978 ACC men's basketball tournament =

- Classification: Division I
- Season: 1977–78
- Teams: 7
- Site: Greensboro Coliseum; Greensboro, North Carolina
- Champions: Duke (5th title)
- Winning coach: Bill Foster (1st title)
- MVP: Jim Spanarkel (Duke)
- Television: The C.D. Chesley Company (Quarterfinals and Semifinals); ABC Sports (Championship Game)

The 1978 Atlantic Coast Conference men's basketball tournament was held in Greensboro, North Carolina, at the Greensboro Coliseum from March 1–4. Duke defeated Wake Forest, 85–77, to win the championship. Jim Spanarkel of Duke was named the tournament MVP.

== Bracket ==
Quarterfinals; March 1
4	Virginia	61
5	Wake Forest	72
2	#15 Duke	83
7	Clemson	72
3	NC State	108
6	Maryland	109^{3OT}

Semifinals; March 2
1	#10 North Carolina	77
5	Wake Forest	82
2	#15 Duke	81
6	Maryland	69

Championship Game; March 4
5	Wake Forest	77
2	#15 Duke	85
