= Bill Foster (basketball, born 1929) =

American college basketball coach

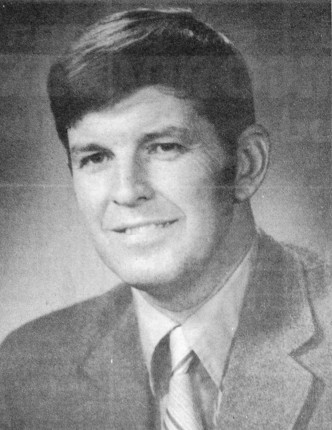
- Foster in 1971

Biographical details
- Born: August 19, 1929; Ridley Park, Pennsylvania, U.S.
- Died: January 7, 2016 (aged 86); Chicago, Illinois, U.S.

Playing career
- 1948–1954: Elizabethtown

Coaching career (HC unless noted)
- 1960–1963: Bloomsburg State
- 1963–1971: Rutgers
- 1971–1974: Utah
- 1974–1980: Duke
- 1980–1986: South Carolina
- 1986–1993: Northwestern

Administrative career (AD unless noted)
- 1993: Northwestern (interim AD)

Head coaching record
- Overall: 467–409

Accomplishments and honors

Championships
- 2 ACC tournament (1978, 1980); ACC regular season (1979)

Awards
- NABC Co-Coach of the Year (1978); ACC Coach of the Year (1978)

William Edwin Foster (August 19, 1929 – January 7, 2016) was the head men's basketball coach at Rutgers University, University of Utah, Duke University, University of South Carolina, and Northwestern University. He is best known for guiding Duke to the NCAA championship game in 1978, and that year he was named national Coach of the Year by the National Association of Basketball Coaches. Foster was inducted into the Rutgers Basketball Hall of Fame and was the first NCAA coach to guide four teams to 20-win seasons (Rutgers, Utah, Duke, and South Carolina). Foster was a graduate of Elizabethtown College.

== Early life ==
Foster was born in Ridley Park, Pennsylvania, in 1929 and grew up in Norwood, Pennsylvania, near Philadelphia. After serving in the U.S. Air Force, he attended Elizabethtown College in Elizabethtown, Pennsylvania, played on the men's basketball team starting in 1948, and graduated in 1954 with a bachelor of science degree in business education. In the 1952-1953 season, he served as student coach of the men's junior varsity basketball team.

== Coaching career ==
Foster began his coaching career at Philadelphia-area high schools in the 1950s. One of his students in a typing class at Abington Senior High School was the daughter of Harry Litwack, the longtime basketball coach at Temple University. Foster and Litwack became friends and business partners, and for about 25 years they operated a popular summer basketball camp in Pennsylvania's Pocono Mountains.

In 1960, Foster was hired as the head coach at Bloomsburg State College (now Bloomsburg University), an NCAA Division II school in eastern Pennsylvania, where he compiled a 45–11 record over three years.

=== Rutgers ===
Foster's Division I career began in 1963 at Rutgers where he led the Scarlet Knights to an overall record of 120–75 (.615) in eight seasons. In the 1966–67 season, the Scarlet Knights finished with a record of 22–7 and was invited to the National Invitation Tournament, the first time the school had qualified for postseason play.

=== Utah ===
After the 1971 season, Foster took the head coaching job at the University of Utah, replacing legendary Utah basketball coach Jack Gardner. Though his stay with the Utes was short, just three seasons (1971–1974), he led the Utes to a 43–39 (.524) record. He also guided the Utes to the 1974 NIT Championship game, where they finished as runner-up to Purdue. Finishing with a 22–8 record, Foster accepted the head coach position at Duke.

=== Duke ===
Foster became head coach at Duke, a program with a long history of success that had experienced a period of limited performance prior to his arrival. Duke was among the schools that had reached 1,000 all-time victories and had previously appeared in multiple Final Fours and won conference championships. Foster later stated that he was familiar with the program from the coaching tenure of Vic Bubas and believed it had the potential to return to its earlier level of success. He also said he was surprised to be offered the position and described it as an attractive opportunity.

Foster's first season of 1974–75 saw few highlights, but there was one. In the 1970s, the four North Carolina member schools of the Atlantic Coast Conference participated in a tournament called "The Big Four Tournament". Duke, taking on eighth-ranked rival North Carolina pulled off a shocker in upsetting the Tar Heels 99–96 in overtime. Foster began to slowly rebuild the program, bringing in one future great player a year. First, it was future All-American Jim Spanarkel in 1975, then future Duke great Mike Gminski in 1976. Those two joined senior prolific scorer Tate Armstrong for the 1976–77 season. The Devils started out 12–3 that year with wins over 15th-ranked NC State and later at 15th ranked Tennessee. But, it would not last. In a game at Virginia, Tate Armstrong suffered a broken wrist and was lost for the season. The young Blue Devils, full of potential but still a fragile unit, would never recover but the next year would produce a season that would nearly stun the college basketball world.

In addition to talented returnees Spanarkel and Gminski, Foster added Indiana transfer Bob Bender who was on the Hoosiers' legendary undefeated 1976 NCAA championship team and stunned everyone by getting a verbal commitment from one of the top players in America, Gene Banks. Joining Banks were two good players in Kenny Dennard and John Harrell from nearby North Carolina Central. The 1977–78 Duke Blue Devils begin to gain steam after a mid-January 92–84 win over second-ranked North Carolina. Duke would win 15 of their final 19 games, en route to a 27–7 season, a final ranking of seventh, their first ACC Tournament title since 1966, and a trip to the NCAA Final Four. It looked like the ride would end in the national semifinals, as Duke would be facing a 6th-ranked Notre Dame team in the semi-final that fielded eight future NBA players. But Duke scored the upset 90–86, setting up a title matchup with powerhouse Kentucky. Duke fought admirably, but Kentucky was too experienced and had the weight of the world on their shoulders from fans back in the bluegrass who wanted that long-awaited title. Still, despite the loss the future looked tremendous for Duke. The 1977–78 Blue Devils are the subject of John Feinstein's 1989 book Forever's Team.

The 1978–79 season saw Duke start the season as the No. 1-ranked team in the nation. The Devils dispatched 14th-ranked North Carolina to win the Big Four Tournament for the first time, but chemistry issues and bad luck with injuries would not recapture the magic of 1978. Duke shared the ACC regular season title, but illness and injury derailed both their ACC tournament and NCAA tournament hopes as Duke finished 22–8 and 11th in the AP poll. Duke had another solid season in 1979–80, defeating second-ranked Kentucky in an early-season matchup and winning another Big Four Tournament over 6th ranked North Carolina 86–74. Duke would assume the nation's No. 1 ranking for several weeks and start out 12–0 on the year. But an injury to valuable forward Kenny Dennard sent the team into an up-and-down league season. After Dennard returned, Duke regrouped and won the 1980 ACC tournament, finished 14th in the AP poll, tallied a 24–9 season, advancing to the Elite Eight after an upset of Kentucky in the sweet 16 in Rupp Arena.

Foster guided Duke to a 113–64 (.638) record from 1974 to 1980. He was named ACC Coach of the Year in 1978 and led Duke to two ACC men's basketball tournament titles, two Big Four titles, an ACC regular season title in 1979, and an appearance in the 1978 NCAA Final Four, where they finished NCAA runner-up. While Foster is overlooked in the wake of the achievements of Duke coaches Mike Krzyzewski and Vic Bubas, the Foster era returned Duke to national prominence and paved the way for Krzyzewski's success.

He was one of two men's basketball head coaches named Bill Foster in the Atlantic Coast Conference (ACC) from 1975 to 1980. The other was at Clemson University. They were not related to each other. Nicknames were used to differentiate the two, with the Blue Devils coach referred to as Duke Foster and the other as Clem Foster. Upon leaving the ACC for his next coaching assignment, Duke Foster became Chicken Foster.

=== South Carolina ===
Foster left Duke after six seasons to become the head coach at the University of South Carolina, succeeding legendary coach Frank McGuire. In December 1983, Foster's health became an issue when he suffered what doctors called a "moderate heart attack." He became ill late in a game against Purdue, which South Carolina won, 59–53, and later collapsed in the dressing room. Although he would recover, he was never quite the same as a coach and would eventually resign in 1986 after a losing season. In 1987, the NCAA placed the program on two years' probation for rules violations that occurred during Foster's tenure.

=== Northwestern ===
In April 1986 Foster was named head coach at Northwestern University, where he would finish his coaching career. He compiled a winning nonconference record, including victories over regional rivals Marquette, DePaul and Loyola of Chicago. However, like his predecessors, he wasn't able to compete with the Big Ten's powerhouse programs for top talent. His Wildcats only won 13 games in Big Ten play, and finished last in the conference in six of his seven seasons.

A highlight of Foster's tenure was a nationally televised upset of defending national champion Indiana in 1988. But the program was decimated in 1990 when four of Northwestern's more talented players transferred out of the program, including Rex Walters, who left for Kansas (and was later a first-round pick in the 1993 NBA draft).

The next season, Northwestern went winless in the Big Ten (0–18) and 5–23 overall. But two freshman starters on that 1990–91 squad, point guard Patrick Baldwin and forward-center Kevin Rankin, would go on to lead the Wildcats to the 1994 NIT as seniors.

That 1993–94 team, however, was not coached by Foster. When Northwestern athletic director Bruce Corrie resigned in April 1993, Foster stepped aside as men's basketball coach and became interim athletic director. After Ricky Byrdsong was hired as his successor as coach, Foster continued as interim athletic director until the end of August. In January 1994, Rick Taylor was hired as the school's permanent athletic director.

== Later career ==
Upon leaving Northwestern, Foster became associate commissioner and director of basketball operations for the now-defunct Southwest Conference. He later worked as a consultant with the Western Athletic Conference and the Big 12 Conference. He was a longtime member of the board of trustees of the Naismith Memorial Basketball Hall of Fame in Springfield, Mass., serving as chairman from 1996 to 1998.

Foster was the author of four books, including "Upward Mobility in Coaching Basketball" and "Filling Seats=Dollars." He died on January 7, 2016, in Chicago.

== Head coaching record ==
Record table
Season	Team	Overall	Conference	Standing	Postseason
Bloomsburg State Huskies (Pennsylvania State Athletic Conference) (1960–1963)
1960–61	Bloomsburg State	12–4	9–3		
1961–62	Bloomsburg State	16–3	12–2		
1962–63	Bloomsburg State	17–4	11–3		
Bloomsburg State:		45–11	32–8		
Rutgers Scarlet Knights (NCAA University Division independent) (1963–1971)
1963–64	Rutgers	5–17			
1964–65	Rutgers	12–12			
1965–66	Rutgers	17–7			
1966–67	Rutgers	22–7			NIT Third Place
1967–68	Rutgers	14–10			
1968–69	Rutgers	21–4			NIT First Round
1969–70	Rutgers	13–11			
1970–71	Rutgers	16–7			
Rutgers:		120–75			
Utah Utes (Western Athletic Conference) (1971–1974)
1971–72	Utah	13–12	5–9	6th	
1972–73	Utah	8–19	4–10	T–7th	
1973–74	Utah	22–8	9–5	T–2nd	NIT Runner-up
Utah:		43–39	18–24		
Duke Blue Devils (Atlantic Coast Conference) (1974–1980)
1974–75	Duke	13–13	2–10	T–6th	
1975–76	Duke	13–14	3–9	7th	
1976–77	Duke	14–13	2–10	T–6th	
1977–78	Duke	27–7	8–4	2nd	NCAA Division I Runner-up
1978–79	Duke	22–8	9–3	T–1st	NCAA Division I Second Round
1979–80	Duke	24–9	7–7	T–5th	NCAA Division I Regional Final
Duke:		113–64	31–43		
South Carolina Gamecocks (NCAA Division I independent) (1980–1983)
1980–81	South Carolina	17–10			
1981–82	South Carolina	14–15			
1982–83	South Carolina	22–9			NIT Quarterfinals
South Carolina Gamecocks (Metro Conference) (1983–1986)
1983–84	South Carolina	12–16	5–9		
1984–85	South Carolina	15–13	6–8		
1985–86	South Carolina	12–16	2–10		
South Carolina:		92–79	13–27		
Northwestern Wildcats (Big Ten Conference) (1986–1993)
1986–87	Northwestern	7–21	2–16	T–9th	
1987–88	Northwestern	7–21	2–16	10th	
1988–89	Northwestern	9–19	2–16	10th	
1989–90	Northwestern	9–19	2–16	10th	
1990–91	Northwestern	5–23	0–18	10th	
1991–92	Northwestern	9–19	2–16	10th	
1992–93	Northwestern	8–19	3–15	10th	
Northwestern:		54–141	13–113		
Total:		467–406			
National champion Postseason invitational champion Conference regular season champion Conference regular season and conference tournament champion Division regular season champion Division regular season and conference tournament champion Conference tournament champion

== See also ==
- List of NCAA Division I Men's Final Four appearances by coach
