= 1977–78 Alabama Crimson Tide men's basketball team =

American college basketball season

1977–78 Alabama Crimson Tide men's basketball
- Conference: Southeastern Conference
- Record: 17–10 (11–7 SEC)
- Head coach: C.M. Newton (10th season)
- Home arena: Coleman Coliseum

1977–78 Southeastern Conference men's basketball standings
	Conf.				Overall
Team	W		L	PCT	W		L	PCT
No. 1 Kentucky	16	–	2	.889	30	–	2	.938
Mississippi State	13	–	5	.722	18	–	9	.667
LSU	12	–	6	.667	18	–	9	.667
Alabama	11	–	7	.611	17	–	10	.630
Florida	8	–	10	.444	15	–	12	.556
Auburn	8	–	10	.444	13	–	14	.481
Tennessee	6	–	12	.333	11	–	16	.407
Vanderbilt	6	–	12	.333	10	–	17	.370
Georgia	5	–	13	.278	11	–	16	.407
Ole Miss	5	–	13	.278	10	–	17	.370
Rankings from AP Poll

The 1977–78 Alabama Crimson Tide men's basketball team represented the University of Alabama in the 1977–78 NCAA Division I men's basketball season. The team's head coach was C.M. Newton, who was in his tenth season at Alabama. The team played their home games at Coleman Coliseum in Tuscaloosa, Alabama. They finished the season 17–10, 11–7 in SEC play.

== Roster ==
1977–78 Alabama Crimson Tide men's basketball team
Players
Coaches

Pos.	#	Name	Height	Weight	Year	Previous school	Hometown
F	52	Reggie King	6 ft 6 in (1.98 m)	—	Jr
F	32	Ken Johnson	6 ft 7 in (2.01 m)	—	Fr
G	10	Robert Scott	6 ft 1 in (1.85 m)	—	So
G		Anthony Murray	6 ft 4 in (1.93 m)	—	Sr
G		Kent Looney	5 ft 10 in (1.78 m)	—
G		Keith McCord	6 ft 7 in (2.01 m)	—	Jr
C		Chris Bragwell	6 ft 9 in (2.06 m)	—	So
F		Robert Chapman	6 ft 8 in (2.03 m)	—	Jr
G		Greg McElveen	6 ft 4 in (1.93 m)	—
F		Richie Hood	6 ft 6 in (1.98 m)	—
C		William Henry	6 ft 9 in (2.06 m)	—

Head coach

- C.M. Newton

Assistant coach(es)

Legend

- (C) Team captain
- (S) Suspended
- (I) Ineligible
- (W) Walk-on
- Injured
- Current redshirt
