= 1977–78 NCAA Division I men's basketball rankings =

- Season: 1977–78
- NCAA Tournament: 1978
- Preseason No. 1: North Carolina
- NCAA Tournament Champions: Kentucky
NCAA Division I men's basketball rankings


The 1977–78 NCAA Division I men's basketball rankings was made up of two human polls, the AP Poll and the Coaches Poll, in addition to various other preseason polls.

== Legend ==
	Increase in ranking
	Decrease in ranking
	New to rankings from previous week
Italics	Number of first place votes
(#–#)	Win–loss record
т	Tied with team above or below also with this symbol

== AP Poll ==
	Preseason	Week 1 Nov. 28	Week 2 Dec. 5	Week 3 Dec. 12	Week 4 Dec. 19	Week 5 Dec. 26	Week 6 Jan. 2	Week 7 Jan. 9	Week 8 Jan. 16	Week 9 Jan. 23	Week 10 Jan. 30	Week 11 Feb. 6	Week 12 Feb. 13	Week 13 Feb. 20	Week 14 Feb. 27	Week 15 Mar. 5	Final Mar. 12	
1.	North Carolina	Kentucky (1–0)	Kentucky (1–0)	Kentucky (3–0)	Kentucky (7–0)	Kentucky (7–0)	Kentucky (8–0)	Kentucky (11–0)	Kentucky (12–0)	Kentucky (14–0)	Kentucky (14–1)	Kentucky (16–1)	Arkansas (23–1)	Marquette (21–2)	Kentucky (22–2)	Kentucky (24–2)	Kentucky (26–2)	1.
2.	Kentucky	North Carolina (1–0)	North Carolina (4–0)	Notre Dame (6–0)	Marquette (5–0)	North Carolina (7–1)	North Carolina (10–1)	North Carolina (12–1)	Marquette (12–1)	Marquette (14–1)	Arkansas (19–1)	Arkansas (21–1)	Marquette (19–2)	Kentucky (20–2)	UCLA (22–2)	UCLA (24–2)	UCLA (26–2)	2.
3.	Marquette	Notre Dame (1–0)	Notre Dame (3–0)	Marquette (4–0)	North Carolina (6–1)	Arkansas (8–0)	Arkansas (10–0)	Arkansas (13–0)	UCLA (13–1)	North Carolina (15–2)	Marquette (15–2)	Marquette (17–2)	Kentucky (17–2)	UCLA (20–2)	Marquette (22–3)	Marquette (24–3)	DePaul (26–2)	3.
4.	Notre Dame	Marquette (0–0)	Marquette (2–0)	Arkansas (6–0)	Arkansas (6–0)	Notre Dame (7–1)	Marquette (7–1)	Marquette (10–1)	Indiana State (12–0)	Arkansas (16–1)	Notre Dame (14–3)	Notre Dame (16–3)	UCLA (18–2)	Arkansas (25–2)	Arkansas (27–2)	DePaul (25–2)	Michigan State (24–4)	4.
5.	San Francisco	San Francisco (1–0)	UCLA (4–0)	North Carolina (5–1)	Notre Dame (6–1)	Marquette (5–1)	Notre Dame (7–2)	Notre Dame (7–2)	North Carolina (13–2)	Notre Dame (11–3)	UCLA (14–2)	UCLA (16–2)	New Mexico (19–2)	New Mexico (21–2)	Kansas (23–3)	New Mexico (24–3)	Arkansas (29–3)	5.
6.	UCLA	UCLA (2–0)	Arkansas (4–0)	Cincinnati (4–0)	Indiana State (7–0)	Indiana State (7–0)	Indiana State (8–0)	Indiana State (10–0)	Arkansas (14–1)	UCLA (13–2)	North Carolina (16–3)	New Mexico (17–2)	Kansas (20–3)	Kansas (22–3)	DePaul (23–2)	Michigan State (23–4)	Notre Dame (21–6)	6.
7.	Arkansas	Arkansas (1–0)	Cincinnati (3–0)	Indiana State (5–0)	UCLA (6–1)	Louisville (6–1)	UCLA (9–1)	UCLA (11–1)	Notre Dame (8–3)	Michigan State (14–1)	Michigan State (15–1)	North Carolina (18–4)	Notre Dame (16–4)	DePaul (22–2)	Notre Dame (19–5)	Arkansas (28–3)	Duke (24–6)	7.
8.	UNLV	Cincinnati (1–0)	San Francisco (2–1)	UCLA (4–1)	Louisville (4–1)	UCLA (8–1)	Syracuse (10–1)	Syracuse (11–1)	Kansas (13–2)	Kansas (15–2)	Kansas (16–3)	Kansas (18–3)	DePaul (20–2)	North Carolina (22–5)	New Mexico (22–3)	Duke (23–6)	Marquette (24–4)	8.
9.	Cincinnati	Louisville (0–0)	Michigan (3–0)	UNLV (5–0)	UNLV (9–0)	UNLV (11–0)	UNLV (13–0)	Louisville (9–2)	Louisville (10–2)	Providence (15–1)	Louisville (12–3)	Louisville (14–3)	Louisville (16–3)	Notre Dame (17–5)	Michigan State (21–4)	Kansas (24–4)	Louisville (23–6)	9.
10.	Louisville	UNLV (1–0)	UNLV (3–0)	Louisville (3–1)	Syracuse (8–1)	Syracuse (8–1)	Louisville (7–2)	Kansas (11–2)	Michigan State (12–1)	Syracuse (13–2)	New Mexico (15–2)	Michigan State (16–3)	Michigan State (18–3)	Michigan State (19–4)	North Carolina (23–6)	Notre Dame (19–6)	Kansas (24–5)	10.
11.	Syracuse	Purdue (1–0)	Indiana State (3–0)	San Francisco (3–1)	San Francisco (6–1)	Cincinnati (6–1)	Indiana (8–1)	UNLV (14–1)	Syracuse (12–2)	Duke (14–3)	Virginia (14–2)	DePaul (18–2)	North Carolina (20–5)	Providence (22–4)	Florida State (21–4)	North Carolina (23–7)	San Francisco (23–5)	11.
12.	Purdue	Syracuse (1–0)	Maryland (4–0)	Syracuse (6–1)	Cincinnati (5–1)	Holy Cross (6–0)	Cincinnati (7–1)	Michigan State (10–1)	Providence (13–1)	Louisville (11–3)	Texas (16–2)	Texas (18–3)	Texas (19–3)	Florida State (19–4)	Texas (22–4)	Louisville (22–6)	New Mexico (24–4)	12.
13.	Michigan	Michigan (1–0)	St. John's (4–0)	Holy Cross (5–0)	Holy Cross (5–0)	Providence (6–0)	Virginia (7–0)	Holy Cross (9–1)	Virginia (10–1)	Indiana State (13–2)	DePaul (16–2)	Virginia (15–3)	Providence (18–4)	Duke (19–5)	Illinois State (23–2)	Florida State (23–5)	Indiana (21–7)	13.
14.	Maryland	Maryland (2–0)	Utah (2–0)	Providence (5–0)	Providence (5–0)	Maryland (7–1)	Kansas (9–2)	Providence (11–1)	Holy Cross (11–1)	New Mexico (13–2)	Georgetown (15–2)	Wake Forest (15–3)	Florida State (18–3)	Texas (21–4)	Syracuse (21–4)	Houston (25–7)	Utah (23–5)	14.
15.	Alabama	Alabama (0–0)	Holy Cross (2–0)	Michigan (4–1)	Detroit (6–0)	Indiana (6–1)	Maryland (9–1)	Virginia (8–1)	Texas (12–2)	Texas (13–2)	Florida State (15–2)	Illinois State (18–2)	Illinois State (20–2)	Illinois State (21–2)	Duke (20–6)	Utah (22–5)	Florida State (23–6)	15.
16.	Minnesota	St. John's (2–0)	Louisville (1–1)	Detroit (4–0)	Kansas (6–1)	Virginia (5–0)	Holy Cross (7–1)	NC State (10–1)	UNLV (15–2)	Georgetown (13–2)	Providence (16–2)	Florida State (16–3)	Syracuse (16–4)	Detroit (21–2)	Detroit (23–2)	Texas (22–5)	North Carolina (23–8)	16.
17.	Wake Forest	Holy Cross (0–0)	Detroit (2–0)	Purdue (4–1)	Utah (5–1)	Kansas (7–2)	Providence (8–1)	Georgetown (10–2)	Duke (12–3)	Florida State (14–2)	Duke (15–4)	Detroit (18–1)	Virginia (17–4)	Syracuse (18–4)	Georgetown (21–5)	Illinois State (24–3)	Texas (23–5)	17.
18.	Holy Cross	Wake Forest (1–0)	Syracuse (4–1)	Maryland (5–1)	Alabama (4–1)	Florida State (8–0)	Michigan State (8–1)	Indiana (8–2)	DePaul (13–1)	Virginia (12–2)	Syracuse (14–3)	Syracuse (15–4)	Georgetown (17–4)	Georgetown (19–4)	Providence (22–6)	Syracuse (22–5)	Detroit (25–3)	18.
19.	Detroit	Detroit (0–0)	Kansas (3–0)	Kansas State (5–0)	Virginia (5–0)	San Francisco (6–3)	San Francisco (8–3)	Cincinnati (8–3)	Georgetown (12–2)	DePaul (14–2)	Illinois State (18–2)	Nebraska (18–3)	Detroit (18–2)	Minnesota (16–7)	Utah (21–5)	Detroit (24–3)	Miami (OH) (18–9)	19.
20.	St. John's	Utah (1–0)	Providence (3–0)	Kansas (5–1)	Maryland (6–1)	Detroit (6–1)	Georgetown (8–2)	DePaul (11–1)	New Mexico (10–2)	Illinois State (16–2)	San Francisco (15–4)	Providence (17–4)	Duke (17–5)	Louisville (16–6)	Louisville (18–6)	San Francisco (22–5)	Penn (20–7)	20.
	Preseason	Week 1 Nov. 28	Week 2 Dec. 5	Week 3 Dec. 12	Week 4 Dec. 19	Week 5 Dec. 26	Week 6 Jan. 2	Week 7 Jan. 9	Week 8 Jan. 16	Week 9 Jan. 23	Week 10 Jan. 30	Week 11 Feb. 6	Week 12 Feb. 13	Week 13 Feb. 20	Week 14 Feb. 27	Week 15 Mar. 5	Final Mar. 12	
		Dropped: Minnesota	Dropped: Purdue (2–1); Alabama; Wake Forest	Dropped: St. John's (5–1); Utah (3–1)	Dropped: Purdue (6–2); St. John's	Dropped: Utah; Alabama	Dropped: Florida State; Detroit	Dropped: Maryland; San Francisco	Dropped: NC State; Indiana; Cincinnati	Dropped: Holy Cross; UNLV	Dropped: Indiana State	Dropped: Georgetown (15–4); Duke; San Francisco (17–4)	Dropped: Wake Forest; Nebraska	Dropped: Virginia	Dropped: Minnesota	Dropped: Georgetown (21–6); Providence	Dropped: Houston; Illinois State; Syracuse	

== UPI Poll ==
	Preseason	Week 2 Dec. 5	Week 3 Dec. 12	Week 4 Dec. 19	Week 5 Dec. 26	Week 6 Jan. 2	Week 7 Jan. 9	Week 8 Jan. 16	Week 9 Jan. 23	Week 10 Jan. 30	Week 11 Feb. 6	Week 12 Feb. 13	Week 13 Feb. 20	Week 14 Feb. 27	Final Mar. 5	
1.	North Carolina т	Kentucky (1–0)	Kentucky (3–0)	Kentucky (7–0)	Kentucky (7–0)	Kentucky (8–0)	Kentucky (11–0)	Kentucky (12–0)	Kentucky (14–0)	Kentucky (14–1)	Kentucky (16–1)	Marquette (19–2)	Marquette (21–2)	Kentucky (22–2)	Kentucky (24–2)	1.
2.	Kentucky т	North Carolina (4–0)	Notre Dame (6–0)	Marquette (5–0)	North Carolina (7–1)	North Carolina (10–1)	North Carolina (12–1)	Marquette (12–1)	Marquette (14–1)	Marquette (15–2)	Marquette (17–2)	Kentucky (17–2)	Kentucky (20–2)	UCLA (22–2)	UCLA (24–2)	2.
3.	Marquette	Notre Dame (3–0)	Marquette (4–0)	North Carolina (6–1)	Notre Dame (7–1)	Arkansas (10–0)	Arkansas (13–0)	UCLA (13–1)	North Carolina (15–2)	North Carolina (16–3)	Arkansas (21–1)	Arkansas (23–1)	UCLA (20–2)	Marquette (22–3)	Marquette (24–3)	3.
4.	Notre Dame	Marquette (2–0)	North Carolina (5–1)	Notre Dame (6–1)	Arkansas (8–0)	Marquette (7–1)	Marquette (10–1)	North Carolina (13–2)	Arkansas (16–1)	Arkansas (19–1)	UCLA (16–2)	UCLA (18–2)	Arkansas (25–2)	Arkansas (27–2)	New Mexico (24–3)	4.
5.	San Francisco	UCLA (4–0)	Arkansas (6–0)	Arkansas (6–0)	Marquette (5–1)	UCLA (9–1)	UCLA (11–1)	Indiana State (12–0)	UCLA (13–2)	Michigan State (15–1)	Notre Dame (16–3)	New Mexico (19–2)	New Mexico (21–2)	Kansas (23–3)	Michigan State (23–4)	5.
6.	UCLA	Arkansas (4–0)	UCLA (4–1)	UCLA (6–1)	Louisville (6–1)	Notre Dame (7–2)	Notre Dame (7–2)	Arkansas (14–1)	Kansas (15–2)	UCLA (14–2)	Kansas (18–3)	Kansas (20–3)	Kansas (22–3)	New Mexico (22–3)	Arkansas (28–3)	6.
7.	Purdue	Cincinnati (3–0)	Indiana State (5–0)	Indiana State (7–0)	UCLA (8–1)	Indiana State (8–0)	Indiana State (10–0)	Louisville (10–2)	Michigan State (14–1)	Notre Dame (14–3)	North Carolina (18–4)	Michigan State (18–3)	DePaul (22–2)	DePaul (23–2)	DePaul (25–2)	7.
8.	Cincinnati	Indiana State (3–0)	Cincinnati (4–0)	Syracuse (8–1)	Indiana State (7–0)	Syracuse (10–1)	Louisville (9–2)	Kansas (13–2)	Notre Dame (11–3)	New Mexico (15–2)	New Mexico (17–2)	North Carolina (20–5)	North Carolina (22–5)	Michigan State (21–4)	Kansas (24–4)	8.
9.	Arkansas	San Francisco (2–1)	Louisville (3–1)	San Francisco (6–1)	Holy Cross (6–0)	Louisville (7–2)	Syracuse (11–1)	Michigan State (12–1)	Louisville (11–3)	Kansas (16–3)	Louisville (14–3)	Notre Dame (16–4)	Michigan State (19–4)	North Carolina (23–6)	Duke (23–6)	9.
10.	Louisville	Syracuse (4–1)	Syracuse (6–1)	Louisville (4–1)	Syracuse (8–1)	Indiana (8–1)	Kansas (11–2)	Notre Dame (8–3)	Providence (15–1)	Louisville (12–3)	Michigan State (16–3)	DePaul (20–2)	Florida State (19–4)	Notre Dame (19–5)	North Carolina (23–7)	10.
11.	Syracuse	Michigan (3–0)	San Francisco (3–1)	Holy Cross (5–0)	Cincinnati (6–1) т	Kansas (9–2)	Michigan State (10–1)	Syracuse (12–2)	Syracuse (13–2)	Georgetown (15–2)	DePaul (18–2)	Louisville (16–3)	Providence (22–4)	Florida State (21–4)	Notre Dame (19–6)	11.
12.	Michigan	Maryland (4–0)	Holy Cross (5–0)	Cincinnati (5–1)	Indiana (6–1) т	Maryland (9–1)	Georgetown (10–2)	San Francisco (12–4)	New Mexico (13–2)	Florida State (15–2)	Texas (18–3)	Florida State (18–3)	Notre Dame (17–5) т	Texas (22–4)	Florida State (23–5)	12.
13.	Maryland	Utah (2–0)	Providence (5–0)	Providence (5–0)	Providence (6–0)	Cincinnati (7–1)	Indiana (8–2)	New Mexico (10–2)	Indiana State (13–2)	DePaul (16–2)	Purdue (13–6)	Providence (18–4)	Texas (21–4) т	Utah (21–5)	San Francisco (22–5)	13.
14.	Wake Forest т	Purdue (2–1)	Michigan (4–1)	Kansas (6–1)	Maryland (7–1)	Virginia (7–0)	Holy Cross (9–1)	Virginia (10–1)	Georgetown (13–2)	San Francisco (15–4)	Florida State (16–3)	Texas (19–3)	Duke (19–5) т	Syracuse (21–4) т	Louisville (22–6)	14.
15.	St. John's т	St. John's (4–0) т	Utah (3–1)	Utah (5–1)	Florida State (8–0)	Georgetown (8–2)	Providence (11–1) т	Georgetown (12–2)	San Francisco (12–4)	Virginia (14–2)	Georgetown (15–4)	Georgetown (17–4)	Syracuse (18–4) т	Georgetown (21–5) т	Indiana (20–7)	15.
16.	Indiana State т	Kansas (3–0) т	Purdue (4–1)	Indiana (6–1)	Utah State (5–1)	Michigan State т	New Mexico (9–2) т	Holy Cross (11–1)	Florida State (14–2)	Providence (16–2)	Wake Forest (15–3) т	Virginia (17–4)	Georgetown (19–4)	Providence (22–6)	Houston (25–7)	16.
17.	Utah т	Providence (3–0)	Kansas (5–1)	Purdue (6–2)	Virginia (5–0)	Utah State (5–1) т	Nebraska (12–1) т	Texas (12–2)	Texas (13–2)	Texas (16–2)	Detroit (18–1) т	Duke (17–5)	Illinois State (21–2)	Duke (20–6)	Utah State (21–6)	17.
18.	Kansas State	Holy Cross (2–0) т	Maryland (5–1)	Maryland (6–1)	Kansas (7–2)	Holy Cross (7–1) т	NC State (10–1)	Duke (12–3)	Colorado State (12–3)	Duke (15–4)	Nebraska (18–3)	St. John's (16–4)	Utah (19–5)	Georgia Tech (14–11)	Utah (22–5)	18.
19.	Alabama	Louisville (1–1) т	St. John's (5–1)	Virginia (5–0)	San Francisco (6–3) т	Providence (8–1) т	Cincinnati (8–3)	Providence (13–1)	DePaul (14–2)	Syracuse (14–3)	Virginia (15–3)	Illinois State (20–2)	Louisville (16–6) т	Indiana (18–4) т	Texas (22–5)	19.
20.	Holy Cross	New Mexico (3–0)	Virginia (5–0)	Alabama (4–1)	Nebraska (9–0) т	San Francisco (8–3)	Texas (10–2)	DePaul (13–1)	Duke (14–3)	Nebraska (16–3)	San Francisco (17–4)	Syracuse (16–4)	Indiana (16–7) т NC State (17–6) т	St. John's (18–6) т	Georgetown (21–6)	20.
	Preseason	Week 2 Dec. 5	Week 3 Dec. 12	Week 4 Dec. 19	Week 5 Dec. 26	Week 6 Jan. 2	Week 7 Jan. 9	Week 8 Jan. 16	Week 9 Jan. 23	Week 10 Jan. 30	Week 11 Feb. 6	Week 12 Feb. 13	Week 13 Feb. 20	Week 14 Feb. 27	Final Mar. 5	
		Dropped: Wake Forest; Kansas State; Alabama	Dropped: New Mexico	Dropped: Michigan; St. John's	Dropped: Utah; Purdue; Alabama	Dropped: Florida State; Nebraska	Dropped: Maryland; Virginia; Utah State; San Francisco	Dropped: Indiana; Nebraska; NC State; Cincinnati	Dropped: Virginia; Holy Cross	Dropped: Indiana State; Colorado State	Dropped: Providence; Duke; Syracuse	Dropped: Purdue; Wake Forest; Detroit; Nebraska; San Francisco	Dropped: Virginia; St. John's	Dropped: Illinois State; Louisville; NC State	Dropped: Syracuse (22–5); Providence; Georgia Tech; St. John's	
