= Joedy Gardner =

American basketball coach

Biographical details
- Born: June 23, 1935 (age 91); Ellwood City, Pennsylvania, U.S.

Playing career
- 1955–1958: West Virginia
- Position: Guard

Coaching career (HC unless noted)
- 1972–1974: Arizona Western
- 1974–1978: West Virginia
- 1978–1981: Northern Arizona
- 1983–1985: Iowa (assistant)

Head coaching record
- Overall: 94–96 (college)

Joedy Gardner (born June 23, 1935) is an American college basketball coach. He was the head coach at West Virginia University from 1974 to 1978 and at Northern Arizona University from 1978 to 1981.
