= 1977–78 North Carolina Tar Heels men's basketball team =

American college basketball season

1977–78 North Carolina Tar Heels men's basketball

ACC regular season champion

NCAA tournament, First Round, L 64–68 vs. San Francisco
- Conference: Atlantic Coast Conference

Ranking
- Coaches: No. 10
- AP: No. 16
- Record: 23–8 (9–3 ACC)
- Head coach: Dean Smith (17th season)
- Assistant coaches: Bill Guthridge (11th season); Eddie Fogler (7th season)
- Captains: Phil Ford; Tom Zaliagiris
- Home arena: Carmichael Auditorium

1977–78 ACC men's basketball standings
	Conf.				Overall
Team	W		L	PCT	W		L	PCT
No. 16 North Carolina	9	–	3	.750	23	–	8	.742
No. 7 Duke †	8	–	4	.667	27	–	7	.794
NC State	7	–	5	.583	21	–	10	.677
Virginia	6	–	6	.500	20	–	8	.714
Wake Forest	6	–	6	.500	19	–	10	.655
Maryland	3	–	9	.250	15	–	13	.536
Clemson	3	–	9	.250	15	–	12	.556
† 1978 ACC tournament winner Rankings from AP Poll

The 1977–78 North Carolina Tar Heels men's basketball team represented the University of North Carolina at Chapel Hill during the 1977–78 college basketball season. They had an overall record of 23–8 (9–3 ACC). North Carolina was invited to the 1978 NCAA Tournament but the Tar Heels were upset in the first round by San Francisco 68–64.

== Schedule ==
Date time, TV	Rank^{#}	Opponent^{#}	Result	Record	Site (attendance) city, state
November 28*	No. 1	vs. Oregon State	W 94–63	1-0	(11,666); Charlotte, North Carolina
November 30*	No. 2	Oregon State	W 90–64	2-0	Carmichael Auditorium (10,000); Chapel Hill, North Carolina
December 2*	No. 2	vs. Duke; Big Four Tournament	W 79–66	3-0	Greensboro Coliseum (15,564); Greensboro, North Carolina
December 3*	No. 2	NC State; Big Four Tournament	W 87–82	4-0	Greensboro Coliseum (15,564); Greensboro, North Carolina
December 7*	No. 2	at William & Mary	L 75–78	4-1	Kaplan Arena (10,000); Williamsburg, Virginia
December 10*	No. 2	Rochester	W 101–43	5-1	Carmichael Auditorium (10,000); Chapel Hill, North Carolina
December 17*	No. 5	vs. No. 6 Cincinnati	W 67–59	6-1	Greensboro Coliseum (15,100); Greensboro, North Carolina
December 23*	No. 3	at Tulane	W 108–103	7-1	Avron B. Fogelman Arena (4,100); New Orleans, Louisiana
December 28*	No. 2	vs. BYU; Rainbow Classic	W 94–81	8-1	Neal S. Blaisdell Center (4,794); Honolulu, HI
December 29*	No. 2	vs. Texas Tech; Rainbow Classic	W 88–76	9-1	Neal S. Blaisdell Center (4,257); Honolulu, HI
December 30*	No. 2	vs. Stanford; Rainbow Classic	W 92–61	10-1	Neal S. Blaisdell Center (5,811); Honolulu, HI
January 4	No. 2	at Clemson	W 79-77 ^{OT}	11-1 (1-0)	Littlejohn Coliseum (10,488); Clemson, South Carolina
January 7	No. 2	at No. 13 Virginia	W 76–61	12-1 (2-0)	University Hall (8,500); Charlottesville, Virginia
January 14	No. 2	at Duke; Carolina–Duke rivalry	L 84–92	12-2 (2-1)	Cameron Indoor Stadium (8,564); Durham, North Carolina
January 15	No. 2	Wake Forest	W 71–69	13-2 (3-1)	Carmichael Auditorium (10,000); Chapel Hill, North Carolina
January 18	No. 5	NC State; North Carolina-NC State rivalry	W 69–64	14-2 (4-1)	Carmichael Auditorium (10,000); Chapel Hill, North Carolina
January 21	No. 5	Maryland	W 85–71	15-2 (5-1)	Carmichael Auditorium (10,000); Chapel Hill, North Carolina
January 26	No. 3	at Wake Forest	L 62–71	15-3 (5-2)	Winston-Salem War Memorial Coliseum (8,250); Winston-Salem, North Carolina
January 28	No. 3	Clemson	W 98–64	16-3 (6-2)	Carmichael Auditorium (10,000); Chapel Hill, North Carolina
January 30*	No. 3	Mercer	W 73–70	17-3	Carmichael Auditorium (10,000); Chapel Hill, North Carolina
February 3*	No. 6	vs. Furman; North–South Doubleheader	L 83–89	17-4	(11,666); Charlotte, North Carolina
February 4*	No. 6	vs. Virginia Tech; North–South Doubleheader	W 101–88	18-4	(11,666); Charlotte, North Carolina
February 8	No. 7	at Maryland	W 66–64	19-4 (7-2)	(14,500); College Park, Maryland
February 11*	No. 7	vs. Rutgers	W 74–57	20-4	(19,694); New York City
February 12*	No. 7	at No. 20 Providence	L 59–61	20-5	Providence Civic Center (5,102); Providence, Rhode Island
February 15	No. 11	Kent State	W 92–59	21-5	Carmichael Auditorium (10,000); Chapel Hill, North Carolina
February 18	No. 11	Virginia	W 71–54	22-5 (8-2)	Carmichael Auditorium (10,000); Chapel Hill, North Carolina
February 23	No. 8	at NC State	L 67–72	22-6 (8-3)	(12,400); Raleigh, North Carolina
February 25	No. 8	No. 13 Duke	W 87–83	23-6 (9-3)	Carmichael Auditorium (10,000); Chapel Hill, North Carolina
March 2*	No. 10	vs. Wake Forest; ACC tournament • Quarterfinals	L 77–82	23-7	(15,836); Greensboro, North Carolina
March 11*	(W 1L) No. 11	vs. (W 3Q) No. 20 San Francisco; NCAA tournament • First Round	L 64–68	23-8	ASU Activity Center (11,213); Tempe, Arizona
*Non-conference game. ^{#}Rankings from AP Poll. (#) Tournament seedings in parentheses. W=West. All times are in Eastern Time.
