= 1977–78 Duke Blue Devils men's basketball team =

American college basketball season

1977–78 Duke Blue Devils men's basketball

NCAA tournament, runner-up ACC Tournament champions

National Championship Game, L 88-94 vs. Kentucky
- Conference: Atlantic Coast Conference

Ranking
- Coaches: No. 9
- AP: No. 7
- Record: 27–7 (8–4 ACC)
- Head coach: Bill Foster (4th season)
- Assistant coaches: Bob Wenzel; Lou Goetz; Ray Jones
- MVP: Jim Spanarkel
- Captain: Jim Spanarkel
- Home arena: Cameron Indoor Stadium

1977–78 ACC men's basketball standings
	Conf.				Overall
Team	W		L	PCT	W		L	PCT
No. 16 North Carolina	9	–	3	.750	23	–	8	.742
No. 7 Duke †	8	–	4	.667	27	–	7	.794
NC State	7	–	5	.583	21	–	10	.677
Virginia	6	–	6	.500	20	–	8	.714
Wake Forest	6	–	6	.500	19	–	10	.655
Maryland	3	–	9	.250	15	–	13	.536
Clemson	3	–	9	.250	15	–	12	.556
† 1978 ACC tournament winner Rankings from AP Poll

The 1977–78 Duke Blue Devils men's basketball team represented Duke University. The head coach was Bill Foster. The team played its home games in the Cameron Indoor Stadium in Durham, North Carolina, and was a member of the Atlantic Coast Conference. They advanced through the NCAA tournament to the championship game, where they lost to the Kentucky Wildcats by a score of 94–88.

== Schedule ==
Date time, TV	Rank^{#}	Opponent^{#}	Result	Record	Site city, state
November 26, 1977*		Johns Hopkins	W 95–49	1–0	Cameron Indoor Stadium; Durham, N.C.
November 29, 1977*		Washington College	W 110–66	2–0	Cameron Indoor Stadium; Durham, N.C.
December 2, 1977		vs. No. 2 North Carolina; Big Four Tournament	L 66–79	2–1	Greensboro Coliseum; Greensboro, N.C.
December 3, 1977		vs. No. 18 Wake Forest; Big Four Tournament	W 97–84	3–1	Greensboro Coliseum; Greensboro, N.C.
December 8, 1977*		at SMU	W 91–67	4–1	Dallas, Texas
December 10, 1977*		at Southern California	L 81–87 ^{OT}	4–2	Los Angeles, Calif.
December 13, 1977*		Chicago	W 99–61	5–2	Cameron Indoor Stadium; Durham, N.C.
December 28, 1977*		vs. Duquesne	W 74–65	6–2	Reynolds Coliseum; Raleigh, N.C.
December 29, 1977*		vs. Saint Joseph's	W 74–61	7–2	Reynolds Coliseum; Raleigh, N.C.
January 2, 1978*		at Virginia Tech	W 86–79	8–2	Blacksburg, Va.
January 4, 1978		at Maryland	W 88–78	9–2	College Park, Md.
January 7, 1978		at NC State	L 50–74	9–3	Reynolds Coliseum; Raleigh, N.C.
January 9, 1978*		Lehigh	W 105–63	10–3	Cameron Indoor Stadium; Durham, N.C.
January 11, 1978		at Clemson	W 107–85	11–3	Clemson, S.C.
January 14, 1978		No. 2 North Carolina	W 92–84	12–3	Cameron Indoor Stadium; Durham, N.C.
January 18, 1978	No. 17	Wake Forest	W 81–72	13–3	Cameron Indoor Stadium; Durham, N.C.
January 21, 1978*	No. 17	at La Salle	W 91–81	14–3	Spectrum; Philadelphia, Pa.
January 25, 1978	No. 11	at No. 18 Virginia	L 73–74	14–4	Charlottesville, Va.
January 28, 1978*	No. 11	East Carolina	W 105–82	15–4	Cameron Indoor Stadium; Durham, N.C.
February 2, 1978	No. 17	at Wake Forest	L 60–79	15–5	Winston-Salem, N.C.
February 8, 1978		No. 13 Virginia	W 100–75	16–5	Cameron Indoor Stadium; Durham, N.C.
February 11, 1978		Davidson	W 104–88	17–5	Cameron Indoor Stadium; Durham, N.C.
February 15, 1978	No. 20	NC State	W 76–64	18–5	Cameron Indoor Stadium; Durham, N.C.
February 18, 1978	No. 20	Maryland	W 81–70	19–5	Cameron Indoor Stadium; Durham, N.C.
February 22, 1978	No. 13	Clemson	W 78–62	20–5	Cameron Indoor Stadium; Durham, N.C.
February 25, 1978	No. 13	at No. 8 North Carolina	L 83–87	20–6	Chapel Hill, N.C.
March 1, 1978	No. 15	vs. Clemson; ACC tournament	W 83–72	21–6	Greensboro Coliseum; Greensboro, N.C.
March 2, 1978	No. 15	vs. Maryland; ACC Tournament	W 81–69	22–6	Greensboro Coliseum; Greensboro, N.C.
March 4, 1978	No. 15	vs. Wake Forest; ACC Tournament	W 85–77	23–6	Greensboro Coliseum; Greensboro, N.C.
March 12, 1978*	No. 8	vs. Rhode Island; NCAA East First round	W 63–62	24–6	Charlotte Coliseum; Charlotte, N.C.
March 17, 1978*	No. 7	vs. No. 20 Pennsylvania; NCAA East Regional semifinal	W 84–80	25–6	Providence Civic Center; Providence, R.I.
March 19, 1978	No. 7	vs. Villanova; NCAA East Regional Final	W 90–72	26–6	Providence Civic Center; Providence, R.I.
March 25, 1978*	No. 7	vs. No. 6 Notre Dame; NCAA Final Four	W 90–86	27–6	Checkerdome; St. Louis, Mo.
March 27, 1978*	No. 7	vs. No. 1 Kentucky; NCAA Championship	L 88–94	27–7	Checkerdome; St. Louis, Mo.
*Non-conference game. ^{#}Rankings from AP Poll. (#) Tournament seedings in parentheses. Source: Duke Athletics

== Team players drafted into the NBA ==
No one from the men's basketball team was selected in the 1978 NBA draft. However, Jim Spanarkel was drafted 16th overall in the 1979 NBA draft. Also, Mike Gminski was picked 7th overall in the 1980 NBA Draft, and Gene Banks and Kenny Dennard were picked 28th and 78th in the 1981 NBA draft, respectively.
