= 1978 National Invitation Tournament =

College basketball tournament in the United States

- Season: 1977–78
- Teams: 16
- Finals site: Madison Square Garden, New York City
- Champions: Texas Longhorns (1st title)
- Runner-up: NC State Wolfpack (1st title game)
- Semifinalists: Rutgers Scarlet Knights (2nd semifinal); Georgetown Hoyas (1st semifinal)
- Winning coach: Abe Lemons (1st title)
- MVP: Jim Krivacs & Ron Baxter (Texas)

The 1978 National Invitation Tournament was the 1978 edition of the annual NCAA college basketball competition.

== Selected teams ==
Below is a list of the 16 teams selected for the tournament.

- Army
- Dayton
- Detroit
- Fairfield
- Georgetown
- Illinois State
- Indiana State
- Nebraska
- North Carolina State
- Rutgers
- South Carolina
- Temple
- Texas
- Utah State
- VCU
- Virginia

== Bracket ==
Below is the tournament bracket.

First Round
Dayton	108
Fairfield	93
Georgetown	70^{OT}
Virginia	68
NC State	83
South Carolina	70
Detroit	94
VCU	86
Texas	72
Temple	58
Nebraska	67
Utah State	66
Rutgers	72
Army	70
Indiana State	73
Illinois State	71

Quarterfinals
Dayton	62
Georgetown	71
NC State	84
Detroit	77
Texas	67
Nebraska	48
Rutgers	57
Indiana State	56

Semifinals
Georgetown	85
NC State	86
Texas	96
Rutgers	76

Finals
NC State	93
Texas	101

Third place game
Georgetown	72
Rutgers	85

== See also ==
- 1978 NCAA Division I basketball tournament
- 1978 NCAA Division II basketball tournament
- 1978 NCAA Division III basketball tournament
- 1978 NAIA Division I men's basketball tournament
- 1978 National Women's Invitational Tournament
