= Bob Davis (basketball coach) =

American basketball coach (1950–1978)

Biographical details
- Born: May 21, 1927; Buckingham County, Virginia, U.S.
- Died: March 13, 2021 (aged 93); Georgetown, Kentucky, U.S.
- Education: Georgetown College

Coaching career (HC unless noted)
- 1950–1953: High Point
- 1953–1973: Georgetown (KY)
- 1973–1978: Auburn

Head coaching record
- Overall: 538–277 (.660)

Accomplishments and honors

Awards
- SEC Coach of the Year (1975)

Robert McCue Davis (May 21, 1927 – March 13, 2021) was an American college basketball coach. He was head coach of the High Point Panthers men's basketball team from 1950 to 1953, the Georgetown Tigers men's basketball team from 1953 to 1973, and the Auburn Tigers men's basketball team from 1973 to 1978. In 1975, he was named Southeastern Conference Coach of the Year. From 1964 to 1973, he served as vice chairman for the USA Basketball Committee and was also head coach of the US basketball team in the 1970 Universiade.

Born in Buckingham County, Virginia, Davis moved with his family at age nine to Huntington, West Virginia, where he later graduated from Vinson High School. Upon graduation, he enlisted in the US Navy. He was honorably discharged the next year before enrolling at Georgetown College, where he played football and ran track. He graduated Georgetown in 1950, completed his master's degree at the University of Kentucky in 1955 and his PhD in education from Peabody College in 1963.

Davis died on March 13, 2021, in his hometown of Georgetown at the age of 93.
