= 1977–78 Kentucky Wildcats men's basketball team =

1977–78 season of University of Kentucky men's basketball team

1977–78 Kentucky Wildcats men's basketball

NCAA tournament National Champions NCAA Division I regular season champions SEC regular season champions

National Championship Game, W 94–88 vs. Duke
- Conference: Southeast Conference

Ranking
- Coaches: No. 1
- AP: No. 1
- Record: 30–2 (16–2 SEC)
- Head coach: Joe B. Hall (6th season)
- Assistant coaches: Dick Parsons; Leonard Hamilton; Joe Dean, Jr.
- Captains: Jack Givens; Rick Robey
- Home arena: Rupp Arena

1977–78 Southeastern Conference men's basketball standings
	Conf.				Overall
Team	W		L	PCT	W		L	PCT
No. 1 Kentucky	16	–	2	.889	30	–	2	.938
Mississippi State	13	–	5	.722	18	–	9	.667
LSU	12	–	6	.667	18	–	9	.667
Alabama	11	–	7	.611	17	–	10	.630
Florida	8	–	10	.444	15	–	12	.556
Auburn	8	–	10	.444	13	–	14	.481
Tennessee	6	–	12	.333	11	–	16	.407
Vanderbilt	6	–	12	.333	10	–	17	.370
Georgia	5	–	13	.278	11	–	16	.407
Ole Miss	5	–	13	.278	10	–	17	.370
Rankings from AP Poll

The 1977–78 Kentucky Wildcats men's basketball team were coached by Joe B. Hall. The team finished the season with a 30–2 record and SEC Championship and won the 1978 NCAA Championship over Duke, 94–88. Noting the all-or-nothing pressure exhibited on the team by Kentucky fans, Hall remarked before the title game that "This season was without celebration for us."

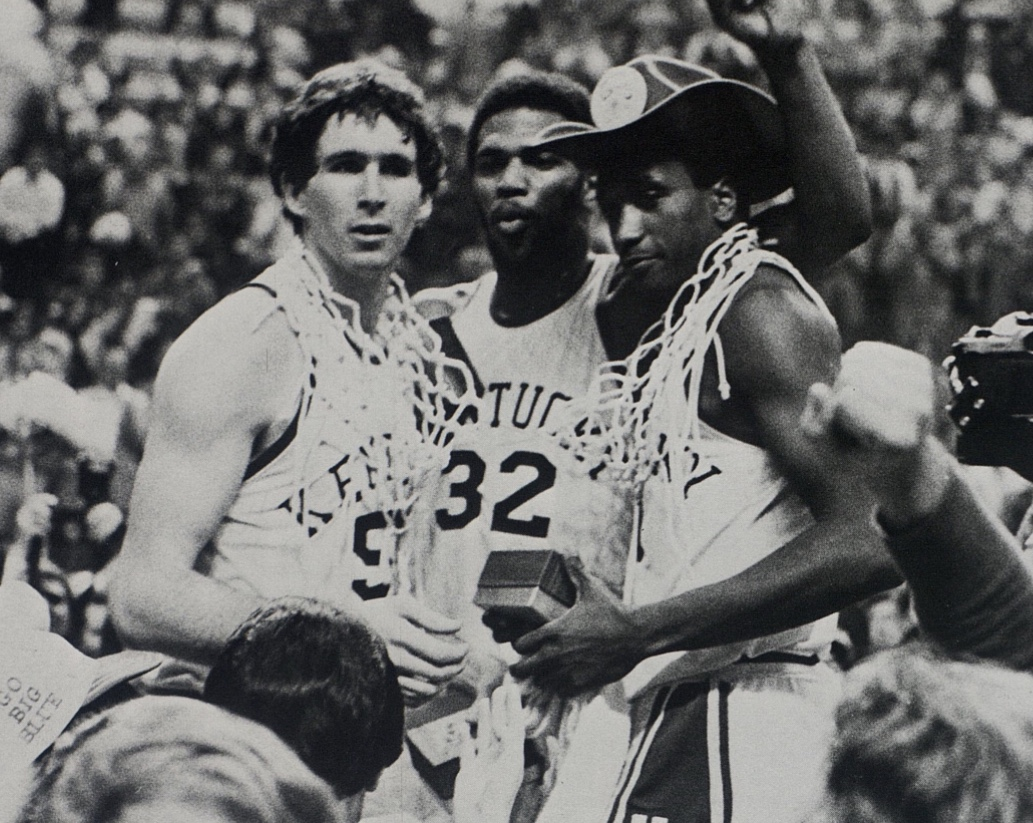
Rick Robey, James Lee and Jack Givens celebrate winning the title.

== Season summary ==
Those who witnessed it call Jack Givens' 41 point game against Duke in the 1978 NCAA championship game one of the finest performances in the game's history. Givens made 18-of-27 shots in leading Kentucky to its fifth national championship and first in 20 years. This team also had a pair of bruising frontcourt players in Mike Phillips and Rick Robey and a great point guard in Kyle Macy. The Wildcats went on exhibition tour of Japan in June following the season's end.

== Schedule ==
Date time, TV	Rank^{#}	Opponent^{#}	Result	Record	Site city, state
November 26*	No. 2	SMU	W 110–86	1–0	Rupp Arena; Lexington, KY
December 5*	No. 1	Indiana; Indiana–Kentucky rivalry	W 78–64	2–0	Rupp Arena; Lexington, KY
December 10*	No. 1	at No. 19 Kansas	W 73–66	3–0	Allen Fieldhouse; Lawrence, KS
December 12*	No. 1	South Carolina	W 84–65	4–0	Rupp Arena; Lexington, KY
December 16*	No. 1	Portland State; UK Invitation Tournament	W 114–88	5–0	Rupp Arena; Lexington, KY
December 17*	No. 1	St. John's; UK Invitation Tournament	W 102–72	6–0	Rupp Arena; Lexington, KY
December 23*	No. 1	Iona	W 104–65	7–0	Rupp Arena; Lexington, KY
December 31*; NBC	No. 1	No. 4 Notre Dame	W 73–68	8–0	Freedom Hall; Louisville, KY
January 2	No. 1	Vanderbilt	W 72–59	9–0 (1–0)	Rupp Arena; Lexington, KY
January 7	No. 1	at Florida	W 86–67	10–0 (2–0)	O'Connell Center; Gainesville, FL
January 9	No. 1	at Auburn	W 101–77	11–0 (3–0)	Beard–Eaves–Memorial Coliseum; Auburn, AL
January 14	No. 1	LSU	W 96–76	12–0 (4–0)	Rupp Arena; Lexington, KY
January 16	No. 1	Ole Miss	W 76–56	13–0 (5–0)	Rupp Arena; Lexington, KY
January 21	No. 1	at Mississippi State	W 75–65	14–0 (6–0)	Humphrey Coliseum; Starkville, MS
January 23	No. 1	at Alabama	L 62–78	14–1 (6–1)	Coleman Coliseum; Tuscaloosa, AL
January 30	No. 1	Georgia	W 90–73	15–1 (7–1)	Rupp Arena; Lexington, KY
February 4	No. 1	Florida	W 88–61	16–1 (8–1)	Rupp Arena; Lexington, KY
February 6	No. 1	Auburn	W 104–81	17–1 (9–1)	Rupp Arena; Lexington, KY
February 11	No. 1	at LSU	L 94–95 ^{OT}	17–2 (9–2)	LSU Assembly Center; Baton Rouge, LA
February 13	No. 1	at Ole Miss	W 64–52	18–2 (10–2)	Tad Smith Coliseum; Oxford, MS
February 15	No. 3	Tennessee	W 90–77	19–2 (11–2)	Rupp Arena; Lexington, KY
February 18	No. 3	Mississippi State	W 58–56	20–2 (12–2)	Rupp Arena; Lexington, KY
February 20	No. 3	Alabama	W 97–84	21–2 (13–2)	Rupp Arena; Lexington, KY
February 25	No. 2	at Tennessee	W 68–57	22–2 (14–2)	Stokely Athletic Center; Knoxville, TN
February 27	No. 2	at Georgia	W 78–67	23–2 (15–2)	Georgia Coliseum; Athens, GA
March 4* NBC	No. 1	UNLV	W 92–70	24–2	Rupp Arena; Lexington, KY
March 6	No. 1	at Vanderbilt	W 78–68	25–2 (16–2)	Memorial Gymnasium; Nashville, TN
March 11*; NBC	(ME 2Q) No. 1	vs. (ME 4L) No. 13 Florida State; NCAA tournament	W 85–76	26–2	Stokely Athletic Center (12,700); Knoxville, TN
March 16*; NCAA Productions	(ME 2Q) No. 1	vs. (ME 3Q) No. 19 Miami (OH); NCAA Tournament	W 91–69	27–2	University of Dayton Arena; Dayton, OH
March 18*; NBC	(ME 2Q) No. 1	vs. (ME 1Q) No. 4 Michigan State; NCAA Tournament	W 52–49	28–2	University of Dayton Arena; Dayton, OH
March 25*; NBC	(ME 2Q) No. 1	vs. (W 2L) No. 5 Arkansas; NCAA Tournament	W 64–59	29–2	Checkerdome; St. Louis, MO
March 27*; NBC	(ME 2Q) No. 1	vs. (E 1Q) No. 7 Duke; NCAA Championship	W 94–88	30–2	Checkerdome; St. Louis, MO
*Non-conference game. ^{#}Rankings from AP poll. (#) Tournament seedings in parentheses. ME=Mideast. All times are in Eastern Time.

== Statistics ==
- Jack Givens (6'4", Sr, F) 18.1 ppg
- Rick Robey (6'10", Sr, F) 14.4 ppg
- Kyle Macy (6'3", So, G) 12.5 ppg
- James Lee (6'5", Sr, F) 11.3 ppg
- Mike Phillips (6'10", Sr, C) 10.2 ppg
- Truman Claytor (6'1", Jr, G) 6.9 ppg

== Awards and honors ==
- Jack Givens, NCAA Men's MOP Award

== Team players drafted into the NBA ==
Round	Pick	Player	NBA club
1	3	Rick Robey	Indiana Pacers
1	16	Jack Givens	Atlanta Hawks
2	39	James Lee	Seattle SuperSonics
