= 1978 NCAA Division I basketball tournament =

Edition of USA college basketball tournament

- NCAA logo from 1971 to 1979
- Season: 1977–78
- Teams: 32
- Finals site: The Checkerdome, St. Louis, Missouri
- Champions: Kentucky Wildcats (5th title, 7th title game, 8th Final Four)
- Runner-up: Duke Blue Devils (2nd title game, 4th Final Four)
- Semifinalists: Arkansas Razorbacks (3rd Final Four); Notre Dame Fighting Irish (1st Final Four)
- Winning coach: Joe B. Hall (1st title)
- MOP: Jack Givens (Kentucky)
- Attendance: 447,234
- Top scorer: Mike Gminski (Duke) (109 points)

The 1978 NCAA Division I basketball tournament involved 32 schools playing in single-elimination play to determine the national champion of men's NCAA Division I college basketball. The 40th annual edition of the tournament began on March 11, 1978, and ended with the championship game on March 27, at The Checkerdome in St. Louis, Missouri. A total of 32 games were played, including a national third-place game.

The process of seeding the bracket was first used in this tournament. Sixteen conference winners with automatic bids were seeded 1 through 4 in each region. At-large teams were seeded 1 through 4 in each region separately. There were in fact only eleven true at-large teams in the field, as the remaining five were conference winners with automatic bids and seeded as "at-large." The practice of distinguishing between automatic and at-large teams ended with this edition; the expanded field of forty in the 1979 tournament was simply seeded from one to ten in each of the four regions.

Led by head coach Joe B. Hall, Kentucky won its fifth national title with a 94–88 victory over Duke, coached by Bill Foster. Wildcat forward Jack Givens scored 41 points in the finale and was named the tournament's most outstanding player.

The bracket's biggest upset came in the first round, when little-heralded Miami (Ohio) defeated defending champion Marquette 84–81 in overtime. The victory was even sweeter for Miami Redskins (now RedHawks) fans as former Marquette coach Al McGuire had earlier strongly criticized the NCAA for potentially matching Marquette against Kentucky in the second round, with Marquette being given a first-round opponent in Miami that was supposedly not even worthy of providing an adequate tune-up game.

Unranked Cal State Fullerton (CSUF) pulled off two upsets, first over 4th ranked New Mexico (coached by Norm Ellenberger and led by Michael Cooper) and then over top-10 San Francisco (featuring Bill Cartwright). The loss was especially painful for New Mexico as the regional semifinals and finals were held on the Lobos' home court in Albuquerque. CSUF then almost upset Arkansas in the West Regional final, losing by 3 points. In each of the three games, the Titans overcame second-half double-digit deficits. In the Arkansas game, they cut a big deficit to 1 and had the ball with 14 seconds left. But Arkansas' Ron Brewer stripped the ball from Keith Anderson and Jim Counce drove down to hit a clinching layup.

In the Mideast regional final, Kentucky knocked off Michigan State, led by freshman Earvin "Magic" Johnson. This was the only time in a 4-year period (that included his senior year in high school, 2 years of college, and his rookie NBA season) that Magic's team did not win its final game of the playoffs and hence the championship.

The Final Four games (semifinals, third-place, and championship) at St. Louis Arena (a.k.a. The Checkerdome) were not played on the arena's official floor. Water damage to it forced the NCAA to borrow the floor from Indiana University's Assembly Hall in Bloomington.

This was the fourth and last year for a 32-team bracket; the field expanded to forty teams in 1979 and 48 in 1980, all seeded. The 64-team field debuted in 1985, eliminating byes for the top seeds (1979–1984). The third-place game at the Final Four was last played in 1981.

== Schedule and venues ==
1978 sites for first round games
1978 Regionals (blue) and Final Four (red)

The following are the sites that were selected to host each round of the 1978 tournament:

First round

- March 11
  - Mideast Region
    - Market Square Arena, Indianapolis, Indiana (Host: Butler University)
    - Stokely Athletic Center, Knoxville, Tennessee (Host: University of Tennessee)
  - West Region
    - McArthur Court, Eugene, Oregon (Host: University of Oregon)
    - ASU Activity Center, Tempe, Arizona (Host: Arizona State University)
- March 12
  - East Region
    - Charlotte Coliseum, Charlotte, North Carolina (Host: University of North Carolina at Charlotte)
    - The Palestra, Philadelphia, Pennsylvania (Hosts: University of Pennsylvania, Ivy League)
  - Midwest Region
    - Mabee Center, Tulsa, Oklahoma (Host: Oral Roberts University)
    - Levitt Arena, Wichita, Kansas (Host: Wichita State University)

Regional semifinals and finals (Sweet Sixteen and Elite Eight)

- March 16 and 18
  - Mideast Regional, University of Dayton Arena, Dayton, Ohio (Host: University of Dayton)
  - West Regional, University Arena ("The Pit"), Albuquerque, New Mexico (Host: University of New Mexico)
- March 17 and 19
  - East Regional, Providence Civic Center, Providence, Rhode Island (Host: Providence College)
  - Midwest Regional, Allen Fieldhouse, Lawrence, Kansas (Host: University of Kansas)

National semifinals, 3rd-place game, and championship (Final Four and championship)

- March 25 and 27
  - The Checkerdome, St. Louis, Missouri (Host: Missouri Valley Conference)

== Teams ==
Region	Seed	Team	Coach	Conference	Finished	Final Opponent	Score
East
East	1Q	Duke	Bill E. Foster	Atlantic Coast	Runner Up	Kentucky	L 94–88
East	3Q	Furman	Joe Williams	Southern	Round of 32	Indiana	L 63–62
East	1L	Indiana	Bob Knight	Big Ten	Sweet Sixteen	Villanova	L 61–60
East	4L	La Salle	Paul Westhead	East Coast	Round of 32	Villanova	L 103–97
East	4Q	Penn	Bob Weinhauer	Ivy League	Sweet Sixteen	Duke	L 84–80
East	3L	Rhode Island	Jack Kraft	Independent	Round of 32	Duke	L 63–62
East	2L	St. Bonaventure	Jim Satalin	Independent	Round of 32	Penn	L 92–83
East	2Q	Villanova	Rollie Massimino	Eastern Athletic	Regional Runner-up	Duke	L 90–72
Mideast
Mideast	4L	Florida State	Hugh Durham	Metropolitan	Round of 32	Kentucky	L 85–76
Mideast	2Q	Kentucky	Joe B. Hall	Southeastern	Champion	Duke	W 94–88
Mideast	1L	Marquette	Hank Raymonds	Independent	Round of 32	Miami (OH)	L 84–81
Mideast	3Q	Miami (OH)	Darrell Hedric	Mid-American	Sweet Sixteen	Kentucky	L 91–69
Mideast	1Q	Michigan State	Jud Heathcote	Big Ten	Regional Runner-up	Kentucky	L 52–49
Mideast	3L	Providence	Dave Gavitt	Independent	Round of 32	Michigan State	L 77–63
Mideast	2L	Syracuse	Jim Boeheim	Independent	Round of 32	Western Kentucky	L 87–86
Mideast	4Q	Western Kentucky	Jim Richards	Ohio Valley	Sweet Sixteen	Michigan State	L 90–69
Midwest
Midwest	3Q	Creighton	Tom Apke	Missouri Valley	Round of 32	DePaul	L 80–78
Midwest	1L	DePaul	Ray Meyer	Independent	Regional Runner-up	Notre Dame	L 84–64
Midwest	4Q	Houston	Guy Lewis	Southwest	Round of 32	Notre Dame	L 100–77
Midwest	2Q	Louisville	Denny Crum	Metropolitan	Sweet Sixteen	DePaul	L 90–89
Midwest	1Q	Missouri	Norm Stewart	Big Eight	Round of 32	Utah	L 86–79
Midwest	2L	Notre Dame	Digger Phelps	Independent	Fourth Place	Arkansas	L 71–69
Midwest	4L	St. John's	Lou Carnesecca	Independent	Round of 32	Louisville	L 76–68
Midwest	3L	Utah	Jerry Pimm	Western Athletic	Sweet Sixteen	Notre Dame	L 69–56
West
West	2L	Arkansas	Eddie Sutton	Southwest	Third Place	Notre Dame	W 71–69
West	4L	Cal State Fullerton	Bobby Dye	Pacific Coast	Regional Runner-up	Arkansas	L 61–58
West	3L	Kansas	Ted Owens	Big Eight	Round of 32	UCLA	L 83–76
West	2Q	New Mexico	Norm Ellenberger	Western Athletic	Round of 32	Cal State Fullerton	L 90–85
West	1L	North Carolina	Dean Smith	Atlantic Coast	Round of 32	San Francisco	L 68–64
West	3Q	San Francisco	Bob Gaillard	West Coast	Sweet Sixteen	Cal State Fullerton	L 75–72
West	1Q	UCLA	Gary Cunningham	Pacific-8	Sweet Sixteen	Arkansas	L 74–70
West	4Q	Weber State	Neil McCarthy	Big Sky	Round of 32	Arkansas	L 73–52

== Bracket ==
* – Denotes overtime period

=== East region ===
Quarterfinals
1Q	Duke	63
3L	Rhode Island	62
4Q	Penn	92
2L	St. Bonaventure	83
1L	Indiana	63
3Q	Furman	62
2Q	Villanova	103
4L	La Salle	97

Semifinals
1Q	Duke	84
4Q	Penn	80
1L	Indiana	60
2Q	Villanova	61

Finals
1Q	Duke	90
2Q	Villanova	72

=== Midwest region ===
Quarterfinals
3L	Utah	86
1Q	Missouri	79**
2L	Notre Dame	100
4Q	Houston	77
1L	DePaul	80
3Q	Creighton	78
2Q	Louisville	76
4L	St. John's	68

Semifinals
3L	Utah	56
2L	Notre Dame	69
1L	DePaul	90
2Q	Louisville	89**

Finals
2L	Notre Dame	84
1L	DePaul	64

=== Mideast region ===
Quarterfinals
1Q	Michigan State	77
3L	Providence	63
4Q	Western Kentucky	87
2L	Syracuse	86*
3Q	Miami (OH)	84
1L	Marquette	81*
2Q	Kentucky	85
4L	Florida State	76

Semifinals
1Q	Michigan State	90
4Q	Western Kentucky	69
3Q	Miami (OH)	69
2Q	Kentucky	91

Finals
1Q	Michigan State	49
2Q	Kentucky	52

=== West region ===
Quarterfinals
1Q	UCLA	83
3L	Kansas	76
2L	Arkansas	73
4Q	Weber State	52
3Q	San Francisco	68
1L	North Carolina	64
4L	Cal State Fullerton	90
2Q	New Mexico	85

Semifinals
1Q	UCLA	70
2L	Arkansas	74
3Q	San Francisco	72
4L	Cal State Fullerton	75

Finals
2L	Arkansas	61
4L	Cal State Fullerton	58

=== Final Four ===
National semifinals Saturday, March 25
E1Q	Duke	90
MW2L	Notre Dame	86
ME2Q	Kentucky	64
W2L	Arkansas	59

National Championship Game; Monday, March 27
E1Q	Duke	88
ME2Q	Kentucky	94
National third-place game
MW2L	Notre Dame	69
W2L	Arkansas	71

Q = automatic qualifier bid L = at-large bid (including 5 automatic bids seeded with at-large teams)

=== Game summaries ===
==== Final Four ====
NBC

March 25

Box/Recap

#5 Arkansas Razorbacks 59, #1 Kentucky Wildcats 64
Scoring by half: 30–32, 29–32
Pts: Ron Brewer 16; Rebs: Marvin Delph 8 Asts: Jim Counce 2	Pts: Jack Givens 23; Rebs: Jack Givens 9 Asts: Jay Shidler 4

The Checkerdome, St. Louis, Missouri
Attendance: 18,721

NBC

March 25

Box/Recap

#7 Duke Blue Devils 90, #6 Notre Dame Fighting Irish 86
Scoring by half: 43–29, 47–57
Pts: Mike Gminski 29; Rebs: Gene Banks 12; Asts: Jim Spanarkel/Bob Bender 5	Pts: Duck Williams 16; Rebs: Bill Laimbeer 10; Asts: Rich Branning 5

The Checkerdome, St. Louis, Missouri
Attendance: 18,721

==== Championship ====
NBC

March 27

Box/Recap

#7 Duke Blue Devils 88, #1 Kentucky Wildcats 94
Scoring by half: 38–45, 50–49
Pts: Gene Banks 22; Rebs: Mike Gminski 12	Pts: Jack Givens 41; Rebs: Rick Robey 11

The Checkerdome, St. Louis, Missouri
Attendance: 18,721

== Announcers ==
- Dick Enberg/Curt Gowdy, Billy Packer, and Al McGuire – Final Four at St. Louis, Missouri; Gowdy called the Notre Dame-Duke Semifinal with Billy Packer, and served as host of the national championship game, while Enberg called the Arkansas-Kentucky semifinal with Packer and the Duke-Kentucky final with both Packer and McGuire.
- Dick Enberg and Al McGuire – First round at Tulsa, Oklahoma (Louisville–St. John's, Notre Dame–Houston); Midwest Regional Final at Lawrence, Kansas; West Regional Final at Albuquerque, New Mexico
- Curt Gowdy and Billy Packer – East Regional Final at Providence, Rhode Island; Mideast Regional Final at Dayton, Ohio
- Jay Randolph and Gary Thompson – Midwest Regional semifinals at Lawrence, Kansas;National Third Place Game (Arkansas-Notre Dame) at St. Louis, Missouri
- Connie Alexander and Bill Strannigan – West Regional semifinals at Albuquerque, New Mexico
- Dick Enberg and Billy Packer – First round at Knoxville, Tennessee (Kentucky–Florida State, Syracuse–Western Kentucky)
- Curt Gowdy and Al McGuire – First round at Eugene, Oregon (Arkansas–Weber State, UCLA–Kansas)
- Marv Albert and Bucky Waters – First round at Philadelphia, Pennsylvania (Villanova–La Salle, St. Bonaventure–Pennsylvania)
- Merle Harmon and Fred Taylor – First round at Indianapolis, Indiana (Marquette–Miami Ohio, Michigan State–Providence)

== See also ==
- 1978 NCAA Division II basketball tournament
- 1978 NCAA Division III basketball tournament
- 1978 National Invitation Tournament
- 1978 NAIA basketball tournament
- 1978 National Women's Invitation Tournament
