= New Mexico Lobos men's basketball statistical leaders =

The New Mexico Lobos men's basketball statistical leaders are individual statistical leaders of the New Mexico Lobos men's basketball program in various categories, including points, assists, blocks, rebounds, and steals. Within those areas, the lists identify single-game, single-season, and career leaders. The Lobos represent the University of New Mexico in the NCAA's Mountain West Conference.

New Mexico began competing in intercollegiate basketball in 1899. However, the school's record book does not generally list records from before the 1950s, as records from before this period are often incomplete and inconsistent. Since scoring was much lower in this era, and teams played much fewer games during a typical season, it is likely that few or no players from this era would appear on these lists anyway.

The NCAA did not officially record assists as a stat until the 1983–84 season, and blocks and steals until the 1985–86 season, but New Mexico's record books includes players in these stats before these seasons. These lists are updated through the end of the 2021–22 season.

== Scoring ==
Career
Rk	Player	Points	Seasons
1	Charles Smith	1,993	1993–94 1994–95 1995–96 1996–97
2	Kenny Thomas	1,931	1995–96 1996–97 1997–98 1998–99
3	Lamont Long	1,840	1996–97 1997–98 1998–99 1999–00
4	Clayton Shields	1,837	1994–95 1995–96 1996–97 1997–98
5	Kendall Williams	1,813	2010–11 2011–12 2012–13 2013–14
6	Ruben Douglas	1,782	2000–01 2001–02 2002–03
7	Luc Longley	1,769	1987–88 1988–89 1989–90 1990–91
8	Hunter Greene	1,745	1983–84 1984–85 1986–87 1987–88
9	Rob Robbins	1,739	1987–88 1988–89 1989–90 1990–91
10	Jamal Mashburn Jr.	1,629	2021–22 2022–23 2023–24

Season
Rk	Player	Points	Season
1	Kenny Page	784	1979–80
2	Ruben Douglas	783	2002–03
3	Hunter Greene	740	1986–87
4	Donovan Dent	715	2024–25
5	Cameron Bairstow	694	2013–14
	Elijah Brown	694	2015–16
7	Marvin Johnson	673	1977–78
8	Kelvin Scarborough	660	1986–87
9	Jamal Mashburn Jr.	651	2022–23
10	Johnny Brown	649	1985–86

Single game
Rk	Player	Points	Season	Opponent
1	Marvin Johnson	50	1977–78	Colorado State
2	Kenny Page	47	1979–80	Illinois Tech
3	Kendall Williams	46	2012–13	Colorado State
	Marvin Johnson	46	1977–78	Kentucky State
5	Toby Roybal	45	1955–56	Montana
6	Kenny Page	44	1979–80	Texas-El Paso
	Kenny Page	44	1980–81	Brigham Young
8	Ruben Douglas	43	2002–03	Wyoming
	Ruben Douglas	43	2002–03	San Diego State
10	Greg Brown	42	1993–94	Texas-El Paso
	Jaelen House	42	2021–22	Air Force

== Rebounds ==
Career
Rk	Player	Rebounds	Seasons
1	Kenny Thomas	1,032	1995–96 1996–97 1997–98 1998–99
2	Luc Longley	922	1987–88 1988–89 1989–90 1990–91
3	Mel Daniels	853	1964–65 1965–66 1966–67
4	Willie Long	800	1968–69 1969–70 1970–71
5	Clayton Shields	758	1994–95 1995–96 1996–97 1997–98
6	Tom King	749	1959–60 1960–61
7	Lamont Long	698	1996–97 1997–98 1998–99 1999–00
8	Alex Kirk	685	2010–11 2011–12 2012–13 2013–14
9	Nelly Junior Joseph	679	2023–24 2024–25
10	Drew Gordon	661	2010–11 2011–12

Season
Rk	Player	Rebounds	Season
1	Drew Gordon	388	2011–12
2	Nelly Junior Joseph	385	2024–25
3	Tom King	375	1960–61
4	Tom King	374	1959–60
5	Willie Long	335	1969–70
6	Ira Harge	331	1962–63
7	Luc Longley	330	1989–90
8	Morris Udeze	326	2022–23
	JT Toppin	326	2023–24
10	Darington Hobson	325	2009–10

Single game
Rk	Player	Rebounds	Season	Opponent
1	Tom King	26	1959–60	Wyoming
2	Tom King	24	1959–60	Denver
	Tom King	24	1960–61	Wyoming
4	Drew Gordon	23	2010–11	Utah
	Darryl Minniefield	23	1971–72	Utah
6	Tom King	22	1959–60	Wyoming
	Tom King	22	1960–61	Texas-El Paso
	Ira Harge	22	1962–63	Long Beach State
	Lewis LaMar	22	1993–94	Fresno State
10	Tom King	21	1960–61	Denver
	Tom King	21	1960–61	No. Colorado
	Mike Lucero	21	1961–62	Brigham Young
	Bill Morgan	21	1965–66	Arizona State
	Mel Daniels	21	1966–67	Loyola Marymount
	Willie Long	21	1968–69	Abilene Christian
	Greg Howard	21	1968–69	Arizona
	Willie Long	21	1969–70	New Mexico State
	Larry Gray	21	1975–76	Colorado
	Larry Gray	21	1975–76	Colorado State
	Nelly Junior Joseph	21	2024–25	Air Force
	Tomislav Buljan	21	2025–26	Mississippi State

== Assists ==
Career
Rk	Player	Assists	Seasons
1	Darrell McGee	684	1986–87 1987–88 1988–89 1989–90
2	Phil Smith	630	1980–81 1981–82 1982–83 1983–84
3	Kendall Williams	617	2010–11 2011–12 2012–13 2013–14
4	Kelvin Scarborough	574	1983–84 1984–85 1985–86 1986–87
5	Dairese Gary	564	2007–08 2008–09 2009–10 2010–11
6	Petie Gibson	560	1968–69 1969–70 1970–71
7	Donovan Dent	493	2022–23 2023–24 2024–25
8	David Gibson	460	1994–95 1995–96 1996–97 1997–98
9	Willie Banks	419	1988–89 1989–90 1990–91 1991–92
10	Jaelen House	395	2021–22 2022–23 2023–24

Season
Rk	Player	Assists	Season
1	Darrell McGee	243	1988–89
2	Donovan Dent	224	2024–25
3	Kelvin Scarborough	212	1986–87
4	Darrell McGee	205	1989–90
5	Phil Smith	203	1983–84
6	Petie Gibson	198	1970–71
7	Donovan Dent	190	2023–24
8	Petie Gibson	183	1968–69
9	Dairese Gary	182	2010–11
	Marlon Parmer	182	2000–01
	Darrell McGee	182	1987–88

Single game
Rk	Player	Assists	Season	Opponent
1	Kelvin Scarborough	21	1986–87	Hawai`i
2	Darrell McGee	16	1988–89	Brigham Young
	Mark Felix	16	1978–79	Central Florida
4	Darrell McGee	15	1988–89	Loyola (Md.)
	Petie Gibson	15	1968–69	Arizona State
	Petie Gibson	15	1968–69	Denver
7	Donovan Dent	14	2023–24	Utah State
	Phil Smith	14	1983–84	San Diego State
	Petie Gibson	14	1969–70	Denver
	Petie Gibson	14	1968–69	Occidental

== Steals ==
Career
Rk	Player	Steals	Seasons
1	Kelvin Scarborough	235	1983–84 1984–85 1985–86 1986–87
2	Jaelen House	224	2021–22 2022–23 2023–24
3	Hunter Greene	203	1983–84 1984–85 1986–87 1987–88
4	Phil Smith	197	1980–81 1981–82 1982–83 1983–84
5	Kendall Williams	186	2010–11 2011–12 2012–13 2013–14
6	Lamont Long	184	1996–97 1997–98 1998–99 1999–00
7	Willie Banks	182	1988–89 1989–90 1990–91 1991–92
8	Charles Smith	178	1993–94 1994–95 1995–96 1996–97
9	Darrell McGee	168	1986–87 1987–88 1988–89 1989–90
10	Dairese Gary	162	2007–08 2008–09 2009–10 2010–11

Season
Rk	Player	Steals	Season
1	Jaelen House	86	2022–23
2	Hunter Greene	84	1986–87
3	Kelvin Scarborough	80	1984–85
4	Kelvin Scarborough	78	1986–87
5	Phil Smith	77	1983–84
6	Tru Washington	71	2024–25
7	Jaelen House	70	2023–24
	Hunter Greene	70	1987–88
9	Jaelen House	68	2021–22
10	Charles Smith	66	1995–96

Single game
Rk	Player	Steals	Season	Opponent
1	Phil Abney	10	1978–79	Davidson
2	Willie Banks	9	1991–92	Tennessee State
3	Jaelen House	8	2021–22	Grambling
	Danny Granger	8	2003–04	Penn State
	Marlow White	8	1994–95	Brigham Young
	Hunter Greene	8	1986–87	San Diego State
	Kelvin Scarborough	8	1984–85	Texas A&M
8	Roland Hannah	7	1999–00	Washington
	Khari Jaxon	7	1992–93	San Diego State
	Everette Jefferson	7	1979–80	Idaho State
	Taryn Todd	7	2021–22	Colorado

== Blocks ==
Career
Rk	Player	Blocks	Seasons
1	Luc Longley	336	1987–88 1988–89 1989–90 1990–91
2	Kenny Thomas	239	1995–96 1996–97 1997–98 1998–99
3	Khari Jaxon	220	1990–91 1991–92 1992–93
4	Alex Kirk	168	2010–11 2011–12 2012–13 2013–14
5	Wayland White	137	1999–00 2000–01
6	Obij Aget	129	2013–14 2014–15 2015–16 2016–17
7	Rob Loeffel	126	1985–86 1986–87 1987–88 1988–89
8	Joe Furstinger	107	2014–15 2015–16 2016–17 2017–18
9	A.J. Hardeman	100	2008–09 2009–10 2010–11 2011–12
	Nelly Junior Joseph	100	2023–24 2024–25

Season
Rk	Player	Blocks	Season
1	Luc Longley	117	1989–90
2	Khari Jaxon	109	1991–92
3	Luc Longley	95	1990–91
4	Luc Longley	90	1988–89
5	Khari Jaxon	88	1992–93
6	Alex Kirk	85	2013–14
7	Kenny Thomas	79	1997–98
8	Wayland White	70	1999–00
9	JT Toppin	68	2023–24
10	Wayland White	67	2000–01

Single game
Rk	Player	Blocks	Season	Opponent
1	Luc Longley	10	1989–90	Hardin-Simmons
2	Khari Jaxon	9	1991–92	Hawai'i
3	Wayland White	8	2000–01	Alcorn State
	Khari Jaxon	8	1992–93	Texas A&M
	Luc Longley	8	1989–90	Towson State
	Luc Longley	8	1988–89	New Mexico State
7	Obij Aget	7	2016–17	UNLV
	Wayland White	7	1999–00	South Florida
	Wayland White	7	1999–00	UNLV
	Kenny Thomas	7	1998–99	Hawai'i
	Kenny Thomas	7	1998–99	San Diego State
	Kenny Thomas	7	1997–98	Colorado State
	Khari Jaxon	7	1991–92	Utah
	Luc Longley	7	1989–90	Hawai'i
	Luc Longley	7	1990–91	Centenary
	Luc Longley	7	1988–89	Pepperdine
