= Hunter Greene (disambiguation) =

Hunter Greene (born 1999) is an American baseball player.

Hunter Greene may also refer to:

- Hunter Greene (basketball) (born 1965), American basketball player

== See also ==
- Hunter green, a shade of green
