= Bobby Dye =

American former basketball coach

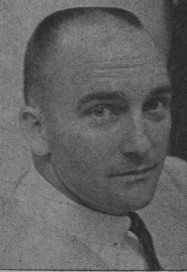

Biographical details
- Born: May 16, 1937 (age 89); Los Angeles, California, U.S.

Playing career
- 1956–1958: Fullerton JC
- 1960–1962: Idaho State

Coaching career (HC unless noted)
- 1962–1965: St. John Bosco HS
- 1965–1967: Cerritos CC (asst.)
- 1967–1973: Santa Monica CC
- 1973–1980: Cal State Fullerton
- 1981–1983: Cal State Bakersfield
- 1983–1995: Boise State
- 1997–1998: Idaho Stampede

Administrative career (AD unless noted)
- 1997–1998: Idaho Stampede (dir. of operations)

Head coaching record
- Overall: 372–223 (college); 115–50 (junior college)
- Tournaments: 2–4 (NCAA D-I); 1–3 (NIT); 6–3 (NCAA D-II)

Accomplishments and honors

Championships
- WSC regular season (1972); PCAA regular season (1976); PCAA tournament (1978); 2 CCAA regular season (1982, 1983); 2 Big Sky regular season (1988, 1989); 3 Big Sky tournament (1988, 1993, 1994)

Awards
- NABC Division III Coach of the Year (1982); 3× Big Sky Coach of the Year (1987, 1988, 1993)

Robert Lloyd Dye (born May 16, 1937) is an American former basketball coach.

== Early life and college years ==
Born in Los Angeles, Dye graduated from Downey High School in nearby Downey, California in 1956. Dye enrolled at Fullerton Junior College and played on the basketball team there from 1956 to 1958. He transferred to Idaho State University and played on the Bengals basketball team from 1960 to 1962 and graduated from Idaho State in 1962.

== Coaching career ==
Dye returned to the Los Angeles area after earning his degree and served as head boys' basketball coach at St. John Bosco High School of Bellflower, California from 1962 to 1965. St. John Bosco made a school-high 18–7 record in the 1963–64 season. From 1965 to 1967, Dye was an assistant coach at Cerritos Junior College. Dye again became a head coach in 1967, this time at Santa Monica City College (which became Santa Monica College in 1971). Santa Monica won the 1972 California junior college championship with a 26–5 record, and Dye had a 115–50 overall record in seven seasons (1967–1973) with Santa Monica.

In 1973, Dye became head men's basketball coach at Cal State Fullerton, a program then in transition from NCAA Division II to Division I. Cal State Fullerton moved to Division I by the 1974–75 season and was a member of the Pacific Coast Athletic Association (PCAA). Dye coached Cal State Fullerton to the 1976 PCAA regular season title and 1978 PCAA tournament championship, and Cal State Fullerton made the West Regional Final of the 1978 NCAA tournament in what was considered a Cinderella run. Dye had a 110–77 record in seven seasons with Cal State Fullerton from 1973 to 1980.

Dye applied for the head coaching job at San Diego State for the 1980–81 season but was rejected; he took that season off. In 1981, Dye became head coach of Division II Cal State Bakersfield; the program made the 1982 and 1983 NCAA tournaments.

First-year Boise State University athletics director Gene Bleymaier hired Dye as head coach in 1983, and Dye's first season with the Boise State Broncos was 15–13, ending seven straight losing seasons and making men's basketball nearly as popular as football. With Dye as head coach, Boise State made the NCAA tournament in 1988, 1993, and 1994, and the NIT in 1987, 1989, and 1991. Dye resigned from Boise State in August 1995 with a 213–133 record in his 12 seasons.

In 1996, Dye took his first coaching job in professional basketball as the head coach of the Idaho Stampede, an expansion team that would begin playing in the Continental Basketball Association (CBA) in the 1997–98 season. Dye also served as director of basketball operations of the team, which was the first professional basketball team in the state of Idaho. The Stampede went 25–31 in its inaugural season.

As of 2011, Dye is retired and lives in Carlsbad, California. He is married and has two children and two grandchildren.

== Head coaching record ==
=== Junior college ===
Record table
Season	Team	Overall	Conference	Standing	Postseason
Santa Monica City/Santa Monica Corsairs (Western State Conference) (1967–1973)
1967–68	Santa Monica City	19–8	9–5	T–4th	
1968–69	Santa Monica City	15–12	5–9	T–5th	
1969–70	Santa Monica City	16–9	7–5	4th	
1970–71	Santa Monica City	19–9	9–3	2nd	
1971–72	Santa Monica	26–5	10–2	1st	
1972–73	Santa Monica	20–7	10–4	3rd	
Santa Monica:		115–50	50–28		
Total:		115–50			
National champion Postseason invitational champion Conference regular season champion Conference regular season and conference tournament champion Division regular season champion Division regular season and conference tournament champion Conference tournament champion

=== College ===
Record table
Season	Team	Overall	Conference	Standing	Postseason
Cal State Fullerton Titans (California Collegiate Athletic Association) (1973–1974)
1973–74	Cal State Fullerton	16–10	6–4	T–2nd	
Cal State Fullerton Titans (Pacific Coast Athletic Association) (1974–1980)
1974–75	Cal State Fullerton	13–11	4–6	T–4th	
1975–76	Cal State Fullerton	15–10	6–4	T–1st	
1976–77	Cal State Fullerton	16–10	7–5	4th	
1977–78	Cal State Fullerton	23–9	9–5	T–3rd	NCAA Division I Elite Eight
1978–79	Cal State Fullerton	16–11	7–7	T-4th	
1979–80	Cal State Fullerton	10–17	4–10	7th	
Cal State Fullerton:		109–78	43–41		
Cal State Bakersfield Roadrunners (California Collegiate Athletic Association) (1981–1983)
1981–82	Cal State Bakersfield	25–6	11–3	1st	NCAA Division II Final Four
1982–83	Cal State Bakersfield	25–6	11–3	1st	NCAA Division II Final Four
Cal State Bakersfield:		50–12	22–6		
Boise State Broncos (Big Sky Conference) (1983–1995)
1983–84	Boise State	15–13	6–8	T–5th	
1984–85	Boise State	16–13	5–9	T–6th	
1985–86	Boise State	12–16	6–8	T–6th	
1986–87	Boise State	22–8	10–4	T–5th	NIT second round
1987–88	Boise State	24–6	13–3	1st	NCAA Division I first round
1988–89	Boise State	23–7	13–3	T–1st	NIT first round
1989–90	Boise State	12–15	7–9	7th	
1990–91	Boise State	18–11	10–6	4th	NIT first round
1991–92	Boise State	16–13	7–9	5th	
1992–93	Boise State	21–8	10–4	2nd	NCAA Division I first round
1993–94	Boise State	17–13	7–7	5th	NCAA Division I first round
1994–95	Boise State	17–10	7–7	T–4th	
Boise State:		213–133	101–77		
Total:		372–223			
National champion Postseason invitational champion Conference regular season champion Conference regular season and conference tournament champion Division regular season champion Division regular season and conference tournament champion Conference tournament champion

=== CBA ===
Legend
Regular season	G	Games coached	W	Games won	L	Games lost	W–L %	Win–loss %
Playoffs	PG	Playoff games	PW	Playoff wins	PL	Playoff losses	PW–L %	Playoff win–loss %

Team	Year	G	W	L	W–L%	Finish	PG	PW	PL	PW–L%	Result
Idaho Stampede	1997–98	56	25	31	.446	4th in National	5	2	3	.400	Lost First Round
Career		56	25	31	.446					.400	
