= 1977–78 BYU Cougars men's basketball team =

American college basketball season

1977–78 BYU Cougars men's basketball
- Conference: Western Athletic Conference
- Record: 12–18 (6–8 WAC)
- Head coach: Frank Arnold (3rd season)
- Home arena: Marriott Center

1977–78 WAC men's basketball standings
	Conf.				Overall
Team	W		L	PCT	W		L	PCT
No. 12 New Mexico	13	–	1	.929	24	–	4	.857
No. 14 Utah	12	–	2	.857	23	–	6	.793
Colorado State	8	–	6	.571	18	–	9	.667
Arizona	7	–	8	.467	15	–	11	.577
BYU	6	–	8	.429	12	–	18	.400
Arizona State	6	–	9	.400	13	–	14	.481
Wyoming	3	–	11	.214	12	–	15	.444
UTEP	2	–	12	.143	10	–	16	.385
Rankings from AP Poll

The 1977–78 BYU Cougars men's basketball team represented the Brigham Young University as a member of the Western Athletic Conference during the 1977–78 college basketball season. The Cougars finished the season with a record of 12–18, 6–8 in the Western Athletic Conference

== Roster ==
1977–78 BYU Cougars men's basketball team
Players
Coaches

Pos.	#	Name	Height	Weight	Year	Hometown
G	20	Scott Runia	6 ft 1 in (1.85 m)	170 lb (77 kg)		Salt Lake City, Utah
G	22	Danny Ainge	6 ft 5 in (1.96 m)	188 lb (85 kg)	Fr	Eugene, Oregon
G	23	Greg Anderson	6 ft 2 in (1.88 m)	165 lb (75 kg)		Salt Lake City, Utah
G	24	Greg Ballif	6 ft 3 in (1.91 m)	190 lb (86 kg)		Provo, Utah
G	30	Mike May	6 ft 1 in (1.85 m)	185 lb (84 kg)		Canoga Park, California
F	31	Steve Anderson	6 ft 6 in (1.98 m)	212 lb (96 kg)		Rancho Palos Verdes, California
F	32	Keith Rice	6 ft 5 in (1.96 m)	200 lb (91 kg)		Portland, Oregon
F	40	Kevin Nielsen	6 ft 7 in (2.01 m)	190 lb (86 kg)		Provo, Utah
F	40	Mark Stroud	6 ft 9 in (2.06 m)	185 lb (84 kg)		Pocatello, Idaho
F	43	Glen Roberts	6 ft 5 in (1.96 m)	200 lb (91 kg)		Riverton, Utah
F	45	Larry Cheesman	6 ft 6 in (1.98 m)	190 lb (86 kg)		Provo, Utah
F	50	Paul Vos	7 ft 0 in (2.13 m)	220 lb (100 kg)	Sr	Waalre, Netherlands
C	52	Dave McGuire	7 ft 0 in (2.13 m)	225 lb (102 kg)		West Covina, California
G	53	Alan Taylor	6 ft 10 in (2.08 m)	240 lb (109 kg)		Granada Hills, California

Head coach

- Frank Arnold

Assistant coach(es)

Legend

- (C) Team captain
- (S) Suspended
- (I) Ineligible
- (W) Walk-on
- Injured
- Current redshirt

Roster

== Schedule and results ==
Date time, TV	Rank^{#}	Opponent^{#}	Result	Record	Site city, state
Regular season
Nov 26, 1977*		at No. 6 UCLA	L 73–75	0–1	Pauley Pavilion (12,202); Los Angeles, CA
Nov 28, 1977*		Long Beach State	W 100–91	1–1	Marriott Center; Provo, Utah
Nov 29, 1977*		at Nevada	L 66–100	1–2	Centennial Coliseum; Reno, Nevada
Dec 3, 1977*		at Idaho State	L 87–94	1–3	ASISU Minidome; Pocatello, Idaho
Dec 9, 1977*		Montana; Cougar Classic	L 72–76	1–4	Marriott Center; Provo, Utah
Dec 10, 1977*		Cal State Fullerton; Cougar Classic	L 75–80	1–5	Marriott Center; Provo, Utah
Dec 13, 1977*		McNeese State	W 78–68	2–5	Marriott Center; Provo, Utah
Dec 16, 1977*		at Illinois	L 74–81	2–6	Assembly Hall (8,612); Champaign, Illinois
Dec 17, 1977*		at Bradley	W 86–79	3–6	Robertson Memorial Field House; Peoria, Illinois
Dec 21, 1977*		at Utah State	L 89–91	3–7	Dee Glen Smith Spectrum; Logan, Utah
Dec 23, 1977*		at San Diego State	L 88–104	3–8	San Diego Sports Arena; San Diego, California
Dec 28, 1977*		vs. No. 2 North Carolina; Rainbow Classic	L 81–94	3–9	Neal S. Blaisdell Center (4,794); Honolulu, Hawaii
Dec 29, 1977*		vs. Rhode Island; Rainbow Classic	L 87–92	3–10	Neal S. Blaisdell Center; Honolulu, Hawaii
Dec 30, 1977*		at Hawaii; Rainbow Classic	W 88–78	4–10	Neal S. Blaisdell Center; Honolulu, Hawaii
Jan 3, 1978*		Weber State	W 81–76	5–10	Marriott Center; Provo, Utah
Jan 5, 1978*		Utah State	W 85–84	6–10	Marriott Center; Provo, Utah
Jan 12, 1978		at Wyoming	L 82–89	6–11 (0–1)	War Memorial Fieldhouse; Laramie, Wyoming
Jan 14, 1978		at Colorado State	L 66–76	6–12 (0–2)	Moby Arena; Fort Collins, Colorado
Jan 19, 1978		Arizona	W 87–86	7–12 (1–2)	Marriott Center; Provo, Utah
Jan 21, 1978		Arizona State	W 96–89	8–12 (2–2)	Marriott Center; Provo, Utah
Jan 26, 1978		at No. 14 New Mexico	L 82–95	8–13 (2–3)	University Arena (18,211); Albuquerque, New Mexico
Jan 28, 1978		at UTEP	W 78–76	9–13 (3–3)	Don Haskins Center; El Paso, Texas
Feb 4, 1978		Utah	L 76–89	9–14 (3–4)	Marriott Center; Provo, Utah
Feb 10, 1978		Colorado State	W 98–81	10–14 (4–4)	Marriott Center; Provo, Utah
Feb 11, 1978		Wyoming	W 76–56	11–14 (5–4)	Marriott Center; Provo, Utah
Feb 16, 1978		at Arizona State	L 75–76	11–15 (5–5)	Desert Financial Arena; Tempe, Arizona
Feb 18, 1978		at Arizona	L 90–104	11–16 (5–6)	McKale Center; Tucson, Arizona
Feb 23, 1978		UTEP	W 73–64	12–16 (6–6)	Marriott Center; Provo, Utah
Feb 25, 1978		No. 5 New Mexico	L 68–71	12–17 (6–7)	Marriott Center (22,998); Provo, Utah
Mar 4, 1978		at No. 14 Utah	L 74–81	12–18 (6–8)	Jon M. Huntsman Center; Salt Lake City, Utah
*Non-conference game. ^{#}Rankings from AP Poll. (#) Tournament seedings in parentheses. All times are in Mountain Time.
