= 1978 Pacific Coast Athletic Association men's basketball tournament =

- Classification: Division I
- Season: 1977–78
- Teams: 7
- Site: Anaheim Convention Center; Anaheim, CA
- Champions: Cal State Fullerton (1st title)
- Winning coach: Bobby Dye (1st title)
- MVP: Greg Bunch (Cal State Fullerton)
- Pacific Coast Athletic Association men's basketball tournaments

1977–78 Pacific Coast Athletic Association men's basketball standings
	Conf.				Overall
Team	W		L	PCT	W		L	PCT
Fresno State	11	–	3	.786	21	–	6	.778
San Diego State	11	–	3	.786	19	–	9	.679
Cal State Fullerton †	9	–	5	.643	23	–	9	.719
Pacific	9	–	5	.643	17	–	10	.630
Long Beach State	7	–	7	.500	16	–	13	.552
San Jose State	4	–	10	.286	8	–	19	.296
UC Santa Barbara	3	–	11	.214	8	–	19	.296
UC Irvine	2	–	12	.143	8	–	17	.320
† 1978 PCAA tournament winner Rankings from AP Poll

The 1978 Pacific Coast Athletic Association men's basketball tournament (now known as the Big West Conference men's basketball tournament) was held March 2–4 at the Anaheim Convention Center in Anaheim, California.

Cal State Fullerton topped defending champions Long Beach State in the championship game, 64–53, to win its first PCAA/Big West men's basketball tournament.

The Titans, in turn, received a bid to the 1978 NCAA tournament, where they advanced to the Elite Eight. It was CSUF's first Division I tournament appearance.

== Format ==
The tournament field expanded again, this time increasing from six to seven teams (Fresno State participated in its first PCAA tournament).

Seven of the eight total PCAA members (newcomer UC Irvine was not invited) qualified for the event and were seeded based on regular season conference records. The top team earned a bye into the semifinal round while the remaining six teams entered into the preliminary first round.

== Bracket ==
First round Thursday, March 2
5	Long Beach State	84
4	Pacific	82
3	Cal State Fullerton	88
6	San Jose State	78
7	UC Santa Barbara	70
2	San Diego State	96

Semifinals; Friday, March 3
1	Fresno State	62
5	Long Beach State	68*
3	Cal State Fullerton	64
2	San Diego State	50

Championship; Saturday, March 4
5	Long Beach State	53
3	Cal State Fullerton	64
