= Norm Ellenberger =

American athlete and coach (1932–2015)

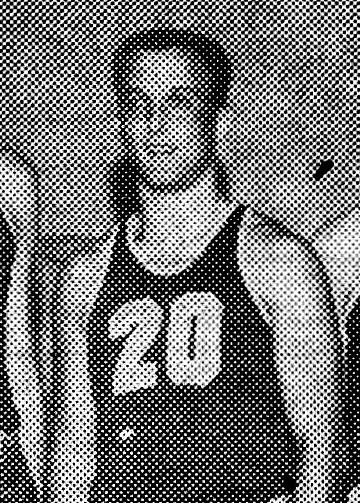
- Ellenberger, circa 1956

Biographical details
- Born: August 2, 1932; Fort Wayne, Indiana, U.S.
- Died: November 15, 2015 (aged 83); Watersmeet, Michigan, U.S.

Playing career

Basketball
- 1952–1954: Butler

Football
- 1951–1953: Butler

Baseball
- 1951–1954: Butler

Coaching career (HC unless noted)

Basketball
- 1957–1964: New Haven HS
- 1964–1967: Monmouth (IL)
- 1967–1972: New Mexico (assistant)
- 1972–1979: New Mexico
- 1983–1985: Albuquerque Silvers
- 1986–1990: UTEP (assistant)
- 1990–2000: Indiana (assistant)
- 2000–2003: Chicago Bulls (assistant)
- 2012: New York Liberty (assistant)

Football
- 1965: Monmouth (IL)

Baseball
- 1965–1966: Monmouth (IL)

Head coaching record
- Overall: 164–98 (college basketball); 2–6 (college football); 21–14 (college baseball)

Accomplishments and honors

Championships
- Basketball; 2 WAC (1974, 1978)

Norman Dale Ellenberger (August 2, 1932 – November 15, 2015) was an American football, basketball, and baseball player and coach. He was head coach of the University of New Mexico Lobo basketball team from 1972 to 1979, winning Western Athletic Conference championships in 1974 and 1978 and compiling an overall record of 134–62 (.684). His former players included future National Basketball Association (NBA) defensive stand-out Michael Cooper, who helped lead the 1977–78 team that was ranked as high as No. 5 nationally. Ellenberger was dismissed as Lobo head coach due to a recruiting scandal known as "Lobogate".

Ellenberger later became lead assistant coach under Don Haskins at the University of Texas at El Paso (UTEP) from 1986 to 1990 and under Bobby Knight at Indiana University from 1990 to 2000. He served as an assistant for the Chicago Bulls of the NBA from 2000 to 2003 and then coached boys' and girls' high school basketball in Wisconsin and the Upper Peninsula of Michigan. He was an assistant for the New York Liberty of the Women's National Basketball Association (WNBA) during the 2012–13 season before returning to high school coaching in Michigan.

== Early career ==
Ellenberger graduated in 1955 from Butler University, where he played for basketball coaching legend Tony Hinkle. Ellenberger was also captain and all-conference player on the football team, and he pitched a no-hitter on the baseball team. In 2012, he was inducted into the Butler Athletic Hall of Fame. After a brief stint in the Pittsburgh Pirates organization, he taught science and coached basketball and other sports from 1957 to 1964 at New Haven High, near the Indiana farm where he grew up.

In 1964 Ellenberger began coaching at Monmouth College in western Illinois, where he led the football, basketball, and baseball teams at one point. His basketball teams compiled a record of 30–36, including a 14–8 campaign in 1965–66.

== New Mexico ==
On April 13, 1967, Ellenberger was hired as lead assistant by head coach Bob King at the University of New Mexico. Under King, the Lobos had run a highly methodical offense, controlling game tempo by emphasizing defense. King gave Ellenberger leeway to open up the offense with a more balanced attack. Despite losing key players to graduation, the 1967–68 Lobos won the Western Athletic Conference (WAC) championship and made the first NCAA tournament appearance in school history. In March 1972, King was named assistant athletic director, and Ellenberger was promoted to head coach. King left the following year to become athletic director and later head coach at Indiana State University.

Under Ellenberger, the Lobos won WAC championships in 1974 and 1978 and compiled an overall record of 134–62 (.684). The team's success, along with his energy and enthusiasm, made Ellenberger highly popular among Lobo fans. He became a local celebrity in Albuquerque, a restaurateur and man-about-town, earning the nickname "Stormin' Norman" for his flashy attire, fiery coaching style, and flamboyant personality. The Lobos were frequently ranked among the top 25 in the nation under Ellenberger, and attendance for Lobo games at The Pit was regularly among the top four in college basketball. The 1973–74 team won the WAC championship and became the first Lobo squad to win an NCAA tournament game. The 1977–78 team was his best at New Mexico, led by Michael Cooper, who went on to become one of the greatest defensive players in NBA history. The Lobos were ranked for most of the season, peaking at No. 5, winning the WAC championship, and reaching the NCAA tournament. Ellenberger was voted runner-up for the US Basketball Writers Coach of the Year award.

The turning point in Ellenberger's career came with the "Lobogate" recruiting scandal, involving forged academic transcripts, payments made for bogus Junior College credits, and other devices to attain eligibility for players who lacked academic credentials. In an investigation into illegal gambling, the Federal Bureau of Investigation (FBI) had placed a wiretap on the phone of a major Lobo booster. While Ellenberger was visiting this booster, in November 1979, he took a call on the tapped phone from an assistant coach. They discussed an arrangement to transfer bogus credits from a California Junior College to the office of the UNM registrar. Based on this conversation, the FBI launched an investigation into the recruiting activities of Lobo coaches. Ellenberger was fired on December 17, 1979. The investigation led to a federal indictment of Ellenberger on seven counts of fraud and forgery of academic transcripts, but he was acquitted of those charges at trial. In July 1981, however, he was convicted by a state District Court on 21 of 22 counts of fraud and submitting false public vouchers. The judge deferred sentence, placing Ellenberger on unsupervised probation for a year, and all counts were formally dismissed in 1983. The NCAA investigation into the scandal found 34 violations of recruiting rules, and the Lobo program was placed on probation and banned from post-season appearances for three years.

== Later career ==
Despite the scandal, Ellenberger remained popular with many Lobo fans. He continued to live in Albuquerque, New Mexico, where he owned a restaurant, appeared in TV commercials, coached the city's Continental Basketball Association team and a women's professional team, and continued to attend Lobo games. Some fans felt he had been unfairly dismissed and even wanted him to be rehired as coach of the Lobos. His ability as a basketball coach had never been in question, and in 1986, former rival and longtime friend Don Haskins hired Ellenberger as his lead assistant at University of Texas at El Paso (UTEP), where he coached for four years, even serving as interim head coach for one season while Haskins was side-lined due to health problems. Another longtime friend, Bobby Knight, hired Ellenberger as his lead assistant at Indiana University, where he coached for ten seasons, from 1990 to 2000.

Ellenberger spent the following three seasons as an assistant to Tim Floyd with the Chicago Bulls of the NBA. While in Chicago, Ellenberger became enamored with the Upper Peninsula of Michigan and bought a lakeside cabin near Watersmeet. In 2003, he accepted a position as head coach of the girls' basketball team at Lakeland Union High School in nearby Minocqua, Wisconsin, leaving at the end of the 2004–05 school year. He then coached at the Conserve School in Land O' Lakes, Wisconsin. In 2009, he became assistant coach at Northland Pines High School in Eagle River, Wisconsin. He won Coach of the Year in three different districts during those years, and in 2011–12 he led the Watersmeet Lady Nimrods to the Porcupine Mountain Conference title. Later in 2012, he became an assistant coach for the New York Liberty of the WNBA. He then returned to Watersmeet and coached the Lady Nimrods through the 2014–15 season. He had signed as an assistant coach at another high school nearby just before his death. His love of basketball led him to continue coaching, but he had a similar passion for the outdoors, regularly fishing, canoeing, and chopping wood at his lake shore cabin.

Ellenberger can be seen briefly in the 1994 movie, Blue Chips, squatting in a timeout huddle next to Bobby Knight. He also appears in an episode of the 2007 documentary series, Nimrod Nation, aired on the Sundance Channel, as an assistant coach for the Watersmeet Nimrods, the subject of the series.

== Death ==
Ellenberger died in his sleep at his cabin in Watersmeet, Michigan on November 15, 2015, at the age of 83.

== Head coaching record ==
=== College football ===
Year	Team	Overall	Conference	Standing	Bowl/playoffs
Monmouth Fighting Scots (Midwest Conference) (1965)
1965	Monmouth	2–6	2–6	T–8th	
Monmouth:		2–6	2–6		
Total:		2–6			

=== College basketball ===
Record table
Season	Team	Overall	Conference	Standing	Postseason
Monmouth Fighting Scots (Midwest Conference) (1964–1967)
1964–65	Monmouth	7–15	5–12	9th	
1965–66	Monmouth	14–8	12–6	3rd	
1966–67	Monmouth	9–13	8–10	7th	
Monmouth:		30–36	25–28		
New Mexico Lobos (Western Athletic Conference) (1972–1979)
1972–73	New Mexico	21–6	9–5	T–2nd	NIT First round
1973–74	New Mexico	22–7	10–4	1st	NCAA Division I Regional Third Place
1974–75	New Mexico	13–13	4–10	7th	
1975–76	New Mexico	16–11	8–6	4th	
1976–77	New Mexico	19–11	8–6	T–3rd	
1977–78	New Mexico	24–4	13–1	1st	NCAA Division I First round
1978–79	New Mexico	19–10	8–4	3rd	NIT First round
New Mexico:		134–62	60–36		
Total:		164–98			
National champion Postseason invitational champion Conference regular season champion Conference regular season and conference tournament champion Division regular season champion Division regular season and conference tournament champion Conference tournament champion
