= 1977–78 New Mexico Lobos men's basketball team =

American college basketball season

1977–78 New Mexico Lobos men's basketball

WAC Champions

NCAA tournament
- Conference: Western Athletic Conference

Ranking
- Coaches: No. 4
- AP: No. 12
- Record: 24–4 (13–1 WAC)
- Head coach: Norm Ellenberger (6th season)
- Home arena: University Arena

1977–78 WAC men's basketball standings
	Conf.				Overall
Team	W		L	PCT	W		L	PCT
No. 12 New Mexico	13	–	1	.929	24	–	4	.857
No. 14 Utah	12	–	2	.857	23	–	6	.793
Colorado State	8	–	6	.571	18	–	9	.667
Arizona	7	–	8	.467	15	–	11	.577
BYU	6	–	8	.429	12	–	18	.400
Arizona State	6	–	9	.400	13	–	14	.481
Wyoming	3	–	11	.214	12	–	15	.444
UTEP	2	–	12	.143	10	–	16	.385
Rankings from AP Poll

The 1977–78 New Mexico Lobos men's basketball team represented the University of New Mexico as a member of the Western Athletic Conference during the 1977–78 NCAA Division I men's basketball season. The Lobos were coached by head coach Norm Ellenberger and played their home games at the University Arena, also known as "The Pit", in Albuquerque, New Mexico.

== Roster ==
1977–78 New Mexico Lobos men's basketball team
Players
Coaches

Pos.	#	Name	Height	Weight	Year	Hometown
F	15	Steve Davis	6 ft 4 in (1.93 m)	168 lb (76 kg)	Sr	Clovis, New Mexico
F	21	Marvin Johnson	6 ft 5 in (1.96 m)	190 lb (86 kg)	Sr	Howard County JC	DeRidder, Louisiana
G	22	Michael Cooper	6 ft 5 in (1.96 m)	165 lb (75 kg)	Sr	Pasadena CC	Los Angeles, California
C	54	Jimmy Allen	6 ft 9 in (2.06 m)	207 lb (94 kg)	Sr	Richmond, California

Head coach

- Norm Ellenberger (Butler)

Assistant coach(es)

Legend

- (C) Team captain
- (S) Suspended
- (I) Ineligible
- (W) Walk-on
- Injured
- Current redshirt

== Schedule and results ==
Date time, TV	Rank^{#}	Opponent^{#}	Result	Record	Site (attendance) city, state
Regular season
Nov 25, 1977*		Idaho	W 120–70	1–0	University Arena (17,455); Albuquerque, New Mexico
Nov 29, 1977*		New Mexico Highlands	W 125–73	2–0	University Arena (13,888); Albuquerque, New Mexico
Dec 3, 1977*		at New Mexico State	W 94–87	3–0	Pan American Center (13,011); Las Cruces, New Mexico
Dec 5, 1977*		Kentucky State	W 126–104	4–0	University Arena (16,457); Albuquerque, New Mexico
Dec 9, 1977*		at Southern California	L 80–93	4–1	L.A. Sports Arena (4,293); Los Angeles, California
Dec 17, 1977*		Alaska Anchorage	W 127–101	5–1	University Arena (15,048); Albuquerque, New Mexico
Dec 21, 1977*		New Mexico State	W 106–78	6–1	University Arena (18,054); Albuquerque, New Mexico
Dec 29, 1977*		Vermont; Lobo Invitational	W 104–81	7–1	University Arena (18,029); Albuquerque, New Mexico
Dec 30, 1977*		No. 10 Syracuse; Lobo Invitational	L 91–96	7–2	University Arena (18,644); Albuquerque, New Mexico
Jan 4, 1978*		Puget Sound	W 102–89	8–2	University Arena (14,433); Albuquerque, New Mexico
Jan 7, 1978*		at No. 9 Nevada-Las Vegas	W 102–98	9–2	Las Vegas Convention Center (6,593); Las Vegas, Nevada
Jan 13, 1978		at Arizona State	W 91–84	10–2 (1–0)	ASU Activity Center (6,689); Tempe, Arizona
Jan 14, 1978		at Arizona	W 93–81	11–2 (2–0)	McKale Center (15,156); Tucson, Arizona
Jan 17, 1978*	No. 20	No. 16 Nevada-Las Vegas	W 89–76	12–2	University Arena (19,044); Albuquerque, New Mexico
Jan 21, 1978	No. 20	at UTEP	W 84–57	13–2 (3–0)	Special Events Center (11,850); El Paso, Texas
Jan 26, 1978	No. 14	BYU	W 95–82	14–2 (4–0)	University Arena (18,211); Albuquerque, New Mexico
Jan 28, 1978	No. 14	Utah	W 113–89	15–2 (5–0)	University Arena (18,155); Albuquerque, New Mexico
Feb 2, 1978	No. 10	at Wyoming	W 94–91	16–2 (6–0)	War Memorial Fieldhouse (7,885); Laramie, Wyoming
Feb 4, 1978	No. 10	at Colorado State	W 91–82	17–2 (7–0)	Moby Arena (11,642); Fort Collins, Colorado
Feb 9, 1978	No. 6	Arizona	W 103–85	18–2 (8–0)	University Arena (18,019); Albuquerque, New Mexico
Feb 11, 1978	No. 6	Arizona State	W 103–92	19–2 (9–0)	University Arena (18,144); Albuquerque, New Mexico
Feb 14, 1978*	No. 5	Hawaii	W 87–69	20–2	University Arena (14,906); Albuquerque, New Mexico
Feb 18, 1978*	No. 5	UTEP	W 59–51	21–2 (10–0)	University Arena (18,116); Albuquerque, New Mexico
Feb 23, 1978	No. 5	at Utah	L 92–95	21–3 (10–1)	Jon M. Huntsman Center (14,451); Salt Lake City, Utah
Feb 25, 1978	No. 5	at BYU	W 71–68	22–3 (11–1)	Marriott Center (22,998); Provo, Utah
Mar 2, 1978	No. 8	Colorado State	W 111–88	23–3 (12–1)	University Arena (18,101); Albuquerque, New Mexico
Mar 4, 1978*	No. 8	Wyoming	W 93–74	24–3 (13–1)	University Arena (18,382); Albuquerque, New Mexico
NCAA tournament
Mar 11, 1978*	(W 2Q) No. 5	vs. (W 4L) Cal State Fullerton; First round	L 85–90	24–4	ASU Activity Center (11,316); Tempe, Arizona
*Non-conference game. ^{#}Rankings from AP poll. (#) Tournament seedings in parentheses. W=West.

== Awards and honors ==
- Michael Cooper – USBWA First-team All-American
- Marvin Johnson – Honorable mention AP All-American

== NBA draft ==
Round	Pick	Player	NBA club
2	31	Marvin Johnson	Chicago Bulls
3	60	Michael Cooper	Los Angeles Lakers
