= 1969–70 New Mexico Lobos men's basketball team =

American college basketball season

1969–70 New Mexico Lobos men's basketball
- Conference: Western Athletic Conference
- Record: 13–13 (7–7 WAC)
- Head coach: Bob King (8th season)
- Home arena: University Arena

1969–70 WAC men's basketball standings
	Conf.				Overall
Team	W		L	PCT	W		L	PCT
UTEP	10	–	4	.714	17	–	8	.680
Wyoming	9	–	5	.643	19	–	7	.731
Utah	9	–	5	.643	18	–	10	.643
Arizona	8	–	6	.571	12	–	14	.462
Colorado State	7	–	7	.500	14	–	9	.609
New Mexico	7	–	7	.500	13	–	13	.500
BYU	4	–	10	.286	8	–	18	.308
Arizona State	2	–	12	.143	4	–	22	.154
Rankings from AP Poll

The 1969–70 New Mexico Lobos men's basketball team represented University of New Mexico in the 1969–70 college basketball season.

== Roster ==
1969–70 New Mexico Lobos men's basketball team
Players
Coaches

Pos.	#	Name	Height	Weight	Year	Hometown
G	50	Ron Becker	6 ft 4 in (1.93 m)	187 lb (85 kg)	Sr	Roswell, New Mexico
F	34	Roger Bowden	6 ft 7 in (2.01 m)	249 lb (113 kg)	Sr	San Antonio, Texas
C	52	Dave Culver	6 ft 6 in (1.98 m)	217 lb (98 kg)	Sr	Topeka, Kansas
G	00	Petie Gibson	5 ft 8 in (1.73 m)	151 lb (68 kg)	Jr	Pittsburgh, Pennsylvania
F	54	Howie Grimes	6 ft 6 in (1.98 m)	204 lb (93 kg)	Sr	New Lenox, Illinois
G	40	Chuck Henckel	6 ft 0 in (1.83 m)	164 lb (74 kg)	Sr	San Antonio, Texas
C	44	Willie Long	6 ft 7 in (2.01 m)	226 lb (103 kg)	Jr	Fort Wayne, Indiana
G	12	Ken Otteni	5 ft 10 in (1.78 m)	176 lb (80 kg)	Jr	Albuquerque, New Mexico
G	24	John Somogyi	5 ft 9 in (1.75 m)	156 lb (71 kg)	So	New Brunswick, New Jersey
F	20	Steve Stephens	6 ft 2 in (1.88 m)	204 lb (93 kg)	Jr	Albuquerque, New Mexico
G	10	Rick Wright	6 ft 0 in (1.83 m)	159 lb (72 kg)	So	San Jose, California

Head coach

- Bob King

Assistant coach(es)

Legend

- (C) Team captain
- (S) Suspended
- (I) Ineligible
- (W) Walk-on
- Injured
- Current redshirt

Roster

== Schedule ==
Date time, TV	Rank^{#}	Opponent^{#}	Result	Record	Site city, state
Regular season
December 1*		CSUN	W 99–82	1–0	University Arena; Albuquerque, New Mexico
December 6*		Oregon	L 59–61	1–1	University Arena; Albuquerque, New Mexico
December 8*		No. 6 New Mexico State	L 83–90	1–2	University Arena; Albuquerque, New Mexico
December 13*		Texas Tech	W 87–65	2–2	University Arena; Albuquerque, New Mexico
December 16*		at No. 3 New Mexico State	L 73–91	2–3	Pan American Center; Las Cruces, New Mexico
December 19*		Saint Joseph's	W 78–77	3–3	University Arena; Albuquerque, New Mexico
December 20*		Washington State	W 85–76	4–3	University Arena; Albuquerque, New Mexico
December 22*		at California	L 79–83	4–4	Harmon Gym; Berkeley, California
December 29*		vs. No. 3 South Carolina	L 62–85	4–5	Municipal Auditorium; New Orleans, Louisiana
December 30*		vs. West Virginia	L 91–95	4–6	Municipal Auditorium; New Orleans, Louisiana
January 3*		Denver	W 77–70	5–6	University Arena; Albuquerque, New Mexico
January 8		at Wyoming	L 74–92	5–7 (0–1)	War Memorial Fieldhouse; Laramie, Wyoming
January 10		at Colorado State	L 62–79	5–8 (0–2)	Moby Arena; Fort Collins, Colorado
January 15		Arizona State	W 97–86	6–8 (1–2)	University Arena; Albuquerque, New Mexico
January 17		Arizona	L 72–78	6–9 (1–3)	University Arena; Albuquerque, New Mexico
January 29		at BYU	W 90–77	7–9 (2–3)	George Albert Smith Fieldhouse; Provo, Utah
January 31		at Utah	L 73–99	7–10 (2–4)	Jon M. Huntsman Center; Salt Lake City, Utah
February 5		at UTEP	L 59–74	7–11 (2–5)	Memorial Gymnasium; El Paso, Texas
February 7		at Air Force	W 64–61	8–11 (3–5)	Clune Arena; Colorado Springs, Colorado
February 12		Colorado State	L 57–64	8–12 (3–6)	University Arena; Albuquerque, New Mexico
February 14		Wyoming	W 90–85	9–12 (4–6)	University Arena; Albuquerque, New Mexico
*Non-conference game. ^{#}Rankings from AP poll. (#) Tournament seedings in parentheses.
