= 1977–78 Cal State Fullerton Titans men's basketball team =

American college basketball season

1977–78 Cal State Fullerton Titans men's basketball

PCAA tournament champions

NCAA tournament, Elite Eight
- Conference: Pacific Coast Athletic Association
- Record: 23–9 (9–5 PCAA)
- Head coach: Bobby Dye (5th season)
- Assistant coaches: Mel Sims; Gary Youngblood
- Home arena: Titan Gym (Capacity: 4,000)

1977–78 Pacific Coast Athletic Association men's basketball standings
	Conf.				Overall
Team	W		L	PCT	W		L	PCT
Fresno State	11	–	3	.786	21	–	6	.778
San Diego State	11	–	3	.786	19	–	9	.679
Cal State Fullerton †	9	–	5	.643	23	–	9	.719
Pacific	9	–	5	.643	17	–	10	.630
Long Beach State	7	–	7	.500	16	–	13	.552
San Jose State	4	–	10	.286	8	–	19	.296
UC Santa Barbara	3	–	11	.214	8	–	19	.296
UC Irvine	2	–	12	.143	8	–	17	.320
† 1978 PCAA tournament winner Rankings from AP Poll

The 1977–78 Cal State Fullerton Titans men's basketball team represented California State University, Fullerton during the 1977–78 NCAA Division I men's basketball season. The Titans, led by head coach Bobby Dye, played their home games at the Titan Gym, in Fullerton, California, as members of the Pacific Coast Athletic Association. They finished the season 23–9, 9–5 in PCAA play to finish in third place. In the championship game of the PCAA tournament, they defeated Long Beach State to win the tournament and receive an at-large bid to the NCAA tournament – the school’s first appearance in the NCAA Tournament. As the No. 4 at-large (4L) seed in the West region, they upset New Mexico and San Francisco to reach the regional final. Despite a valiant effort, the Titans fell to Arkansas in the Elite Eight.

== Roster ==
1977–78 Cal State Fullerton Titans men's basketball team
Players
Coaches

Pos.	#	Name	Height	Weight	Year	Previous school	Hometown
F	30	Greg Bunch	6 ft 6 in (1.98 m)	190 lb (86 kg)	Sr	Pacific	San Bernardino, California
G		Keith Anderson	6 ft 2 in (1.88 m)	180 lb (82 kg)	Jr	Verbum Dei	Los Angeles, California
G		George Barrios	6 ft 0 in (1.83 m)	170 lb (77 kg)	Fr	Fountain Valley	Fountain Valley, California
F		Reggie Burt	6 ft 4 in (1.93 m)	190 lb (86 kg)	Sr	Merced JC	Fort Wayne, Indiana
G		Kevin Heenan	6 ft 4 in (1.93 m)	175 lb (79 kg)	Jr	El Dorado	Placentia, California
G/F		Tom Morgan	6 ft 6 in (1.98 m)	205 lb (93 kg)	So	Boise State	Rancho Palos Verdes, California
F		Mike Niles	6 ft 6 in (1.98 m)	225 lb (102 kg)	Jr	Jefferson	Los Angeles, California
F/C		Greg Palm	6 ft 8 in (2.03 m)	195 lb (88 kg)	Fr	Mumford	Detroit, Michigan
C		Dave Rohde	6 ft 11 in (2.11 m)	240 lb (109 kg)	So	Loyola Marymount	Fountain Valley, California
C		Daryl Roper	6 ft 8 in (2.03 m)	200 lb (91 kg)	So	John C. Fremont	Los Angeles, California
F		Mike Route	6 ft 4 in (1.93 m)	185 lb (84 kg)	Jr	Indiana State	Chicago, Illinois
F/C		Steve Shaw	6 ft 8 in (2.03 m)	215 lb (98 kg)	Sr	El Camino JC	Redondo Beach, California

Head coach

- Bobby Dye (Idaho State)

Assistant coach(es)

- Mel Sims
- Gary Youngblood

Legend

- (C) Team captain
- (S) Suspended
- (I) Ineligible
- (W) Walk-on
- Injured
- Current redshirt

Roster

== Schedule and results ==
Date time, TV	Rank^{#}	Opponent^{#}	Result	Record	Site (attendance) city, state
Non-conference regular season
Nov 26, 1977*; 8:00 p.m.		at Oregon	L 61–69	0–1	McArthur Court (10,500); Eugene, Oregon
Dec 3, 1977*; 7:30 p.m.		Los Angeles State	W 87–72	1–1	Titan Gym (2,479); Fullerton, California
Dec 6, 1977*; 7:30 p.m.		Chapman	W 98–72	2–1	Titan Gym (2,112); Fullerton, California
Dec 9, 1977*; 7:00 p.m.		vs. William & Mary; Cougar Classic	L 62–67	2–2	Marriott Center (14,385); Provo, Utah
Dec 10, 1977*; 9:00 p.m.		at BYU; Cougar Classic	W 80–75	3–2	Marriott Center (11,128); Provo, Utah
Dec 12, 1977*; 7:30 p.m.		Wisconsin–Parkside	W 65–59 ^{OT}	4–2	Titan Gym (1,166); Fullerton, California
Dec 17, 1977*; 7:30 p.m.		Boise State	W 74–57	5–2	Titan Gym (1,692); Fullerton, California
Dec 19, 1977*; 7:30 p.m.		Aurora	W 77–47	6–2	Titan Gym (892); Fullerton, California
Dec 21, 1977*; 7:00 p.m.		vs. Los Angeles State; Portland Classic	W 92–77	7–2	Viking Pavilion (1,500); Portland, Oregon
Dec 22, 1977*; 9:00 p.m.		at Portland State; Portland Classic	W 80–62	8–2	Viking Pavilion (1,778); Portland, Oregon
Jan 3, 1978*; 8:00 p.m.		at Chapman	W 70–64	9–2	(1,012); Orange, California
Jan 7, 1978*; 7:30 p.m.		Illinois State	L 85–88	9–3	Titan Gym (3,290); Fullerton, California
PCAA regular season
Jan 12, 1978; 7:30 p.m.		UC Santa Barbara	W 56–54	10–3 (1–0)	Titan Gym (2,317); Fullerton, California
Jan 14, 1978; 8:00 p.m.		at UC Irvine	W 88–59	11–3 (2–0)	Crawford Hall (1,382); Irvine, California
Jan 19, 1978; 7:30 p.m.		San Jose State	W 81–66	12–3 (3–0)	Titan Gym (2,078); Fullerton, California
Jan 21, 1978; 7:30 p.m.		Pacific	W 79–61	13–3 (4–0)	Titan Gym (3,117); Fullerton, California
Jan 26, 1978; 8:00 p.m.		at San Diego State	L 69–94	13–4 (4–1)	Peterson Gym (3,204); San Diego, California
Jan 28, 1978; 7:30 p.m.		Long Beach State	W 83–81	14–4 (5–1)	Titan Gym (3,499); Fullerton, California
Feb 1, 1978; 8:00 p.m.		at Fresno State	L 47–55	14–5 (5–2)	Selland Arena (6,266); Fresno, California
Feb 4, 1978; 7:30 p.m.		Fresno State	W 54–48	15–5 (6–2)	Titan Gym (3,112); Fullerton, California
Feb 9, 1978; 8:00 p.m.		at Long Beach State	L 84–88	15–6 (6–3)	Long Beach Arena (5,130); Long Beach, California
Feb 11, 1978; 7:30 p.m.		San Diego State	L 70–76	15–7 (6–4)	Titan Gym (3,202); Fullerton, California
Feb 16, 1978; 8:00 p.m.		at Pacific	L 62–71	15–8 (6–5)	Pacific Pavilion (2,600); Stockton, California
Feb 18, 1978; 8:00 p.m.		at San Jose State	W 80–78	16–8 (7–5)	Independence High School (1,551); San Jose, California
Feb 23, 1978; 7:30 p.m.		UC Irvine	W 83–75	17–8 (8–5)	Titan Gym (1,432); Fullerton, California
Feb 25, 1978; 8:00 p.m.		at UC Santa Barbara	W 85–67	18–8 (9–5)	Robertson Gymnasium (1,434); Santa Barbara, California
PCAA tournament
Mar 2, 1978*	(3)	(6) San Jose State; Quarterfinals	W 88–78	19–8	Anaheim Convention Center (3,681); Anaheim, California
Mar 3, 1978*	(3)	(2) San Diego State; Semifinals	W 64–50	20–8	Anaheim Convention Center (5,894); Anaheim, California
Mar 4, 1978*	(3)	vs. (5) Long Beach State; Championship game	W 64–53	21–8	Anaheim Convention Center (6,692); Anaheim, California
NCAA tournament
Mar 11, 1978*	(W 4L)	vs. (W 2Q) No. 5 New Mexico; First Round	W 90–85	22–8	ASU Activity Center (11,316); Tempe, Arizona
Mar 16, 1978*	(W 4L)	vs. (W 3Q) No. 11 San Francisco; West Regional Semifinal – Sweet Sixteen	W 75–72	23–8	University Arena (17,750); Albuquerque, New Mexico
Mar 18, 1978*	(W 4L)	vs. (W 2L) No. 5 Arkansas; West Regional Final – Elite Eight	L 58–61	23–9	University Arena (18,144); Albuquerque, New Mexico
*Non-conference game. ^{#}Rankings from AP Poll. (#) Tournament seedings in parentheses. W=West. All times are in Pacific Time.
