= 1977–78 UC Irvine Anteaters men's basketball team =

American college basketball season

1977–78 UC Irvine Anteaters men's basketball
- Conference: Pacific Coast Athletic Association
- Record: 8–17 (2–12 PCAA)
- Head coach: Tim Tift (9th season)
- Home arena: Crawford Hall

1977–78 Pacific Coast Athletic Association men's basketball standings
	Conf.				Overall
Team	W		L	PCT	W		L	PCT
Fresno State	11	–	3	.786	21	–	6	.778
San Diego State	11	–	3	.786	19	–	9	.679
Cal State Fullerton †	9	–	5	.643	23	–	9	.719
Pacific	9	–	5	.643	17	–	10	.630
Long Beach State	7	–	7	.500	16	–	13	.552
San Jose State	4	–	10	.286	8	–	19	.296
UC Santa Barbara	3	–	11	.214	8	–	19	.296
UC Irvine	2	–	12	.143	8	–	17	.320
† 1978 PCAA tournament winner Rankings from AP Poll

The 1977–78 UC Irvine Anteaters men's basketball team represented the University of California, Irvine during the 1977–78 NCAA Division I men's basketball season. This was the program's first season in Division I after spending the previous 12 season in Division II. The Anteaters were led by ninth year head coach Tim Tift and played their home games at Crawford Hall as members of the Pacific Coast Athletic Association. They finished their inaugural season 8–17 and were 2–12 in PCAA play to finish 8th place. The anteaters did not receive an invitation to the 1978 PCAA tournament.

== Previous season ==
The 1976–77 UC Irvine Anteaters men's basketball team finished their final season in NCAA Division II as an Independent with a record of 10–17.

In July 1977, the anteaters were formally accepted into the Pacific Coast Athletic Association and reclassified as an NCAA Division I program beginning with the 1977–78 season.

== Off-season ==
=== Incoming transfer ===
Name	Pos.	Height	Weight	Year	Hometown	Notes
Steve McGuire	F	6'5"	N/A	Jr.	N/A	Junior college transfer from Rio Hondo College

=== 1977 Recruiting Class ===
College recruiting information (1977)
Name	Hometown	School	Height	Weight	Commit date
Quentin Brown; F	N/A	Theodore Roosevelt High School (Fresno) (CA)	6 ft 6 in (1.98 m)	N/A	
Quentin Brown; F	Recruit ratings: No ratings found				
Willie Alexander; G	N/A	Theodore Roosevelt High School (Fresno) (CA)	6 ft 1 in (1.85 m)	N/A	
Willie Alexander; G	Recruit ratings: No ratings found				
Bret Bell; C	N/A	Sanger Union High School (CA)	6 ft 8 in (2.03 m)	N/A	
Bret Bell; C	Recruit ratings: No ratings found				
Rick Jurk; G	N/A	Mira Costa High School (CA)	6 ft 4 in (1.93 m)	N/A	
Rick Jurk; G	Recruit ratings: No ratings found				
Overall recruit ranking:
Note: In many cases, Scout, Rivals, 247Sports, On3, and ESPN may conflict in their listings of height and weight.; In these cases, the average was taken. ESPN grades are on a 100-point scale.; Sources:

== Roster ==
1977–78 UC Irvine Anteaters men's basketball team
Players
Coaches

Pos.	#	Name	Height	Weight	Year	Hometown
C		Bret Bell	6 ft 8 in (2.03 m)	—	Fr
C		Phil Bolden	6 ft 6 in (1.98 m)	—	Jr
F		Quentin Brown	6 ft 6 in (1.98 m)	—	Fr
G		Ben Carson	6 ft 0 in (1.83 m)	—	So
C		Kirk Christ	6 ft 6 in (1.98 m)	—	Sr
G		Rick Jurk	6 ft 4 in (1.93 m)	—	Fr
C		Dave Knudsen	6 ft 7 in (2.01 m)	—	So
F		Steve McGuire	6 ft 5 in (1.96 m)	—	Jr
F		Steve Rodgers	6 ft 8 in (2.03 m)	—	So
G		Jack Sapp	6 ft 0 in (1.83 m)	—	So
F		Wayne Smith	6 ft 5 in (1.96 m)	—	RS Sr
G		Louis Stephens	6 ft 4 in (1.93 m)	—	Sr

Head coach

Tim Tift (Pepperdine)

Assistant coach(es)

Legend

- (C) Team captain
- (S) Suspended
- (I) Ineligible
- (W) Walk-on
- Injured
- Current redshirt

Roster
Last update: July 10, 2017

== Schedule and results ==
Date time, TV	Rank^{#}	Opponent^{#}	Result	Record	Site (attendance) city, state
Regular season
November 27, 1977*		at Portland	L 61–77	0–1	Howard Hall (945); Portland, OR
November 29, 1977*		at Chico State	W 62–56	1–1	– (352); Chico, CA
December 3, 1977*		at UC San Diego	L 64–76	1–2	– (250); San Diego, CA
December 10, 1977*		Wisconsin–Parkside	W 59–51	2–2	Crawford Hall (450); Irvine, CA
December 16, 1977*		Boise State	W 66–64	3–2	Crawford Hall (525); Irvine, CA
December 17, 1977*		Aurora College	W 70–48	4–2	Crawford Hall (450); Irvine, CA
December 20, 1977*		Portland	L 68–73	4–3	Crawford Hall (703); Irvine, CA
December 22, 1977*		at Oregon	L 62–77	4–4	McArthur Court (10,500); Eugene, OR
December 30, 1977*		at California	L 50–83	4–5	Harmon Gym (2,500); Berkeley, CA
January 7, 1978*		at Northern Colorado	W 60–58	5–5	Butler–Hancock Hall (650); Greeley, CO
January 12, 1978		Fresno State	L 40–45	5–6 (0–1)	Crawford Hall (1,025); Irvine, CA
January 14, 1978		Cal State Fullerton	L 59–88	5–7 (0–2)	Crawford Hall (1,382); Irvine, CA
January 19, 1978		at San Diego State	L 65–90	5–8 (0–3)	Peterson Gym (2,881); San Diego, CA
January 21, 1978		at Long Beach State	L 79–92	5–9 (0–4)	Long Beach Arena (3,036); Long Beach, CA
January 24, 1978*		at Loyola Marymount	W 72–69	6–9	Loyola Memorial Gymnasium (800); Los Angeles, CA
January 26, 1978		Pacific	L 58–70	6–10 (0–5)	Crawford Hall (575); Irvine, CA
January 28, 1978		San Jose State	W 73–58	7–10 (1–5)	Crawford Hall (682); Irvine, CA
February 2, 1978		at UC Santa Barbara	L 76–78	7–11 (1–6)	Robertson Gymnasium (1,482); Santa Barbara, CA
February 4, 1978		UC Santa Barbara	W 68–65	8–11 (2–6)	Crawford Hall (956); Irvine, CA
February 9, 1978		at San Jose State	L 67–70	8–12 (2–7)	Independence High School (1,440); San Jose, CA
February 11, 1978		at Pacific	L 73–58	8–13 (2–8)	Pacific Pavilion (2,350); Stockton, CA
February 16, 1978		Long Beach State	L 64–73	8–14 (2–9)	Crawford Hall (1,328); Irvine, CA
February 18, 1978		San Diego State	L 42–48	8–15 (2–10)	Crawford Hall (1,101); Irvine, CA
February 23, 1978		at Cal State Fullerton	L 75–83	8–16 (2–11)	Titan Gym (1,432); Fullerton, CA
February 25, 1978		at Fresno State	L 73–58	8–17 (2–12)	Selland Arena (6,493); Fresno, CA
*Non-conference game. ^{#}Rankings from AP Poll. (#) Tournament seedings in parentheses. All times are in Pacific Time.

== Awards and honors ==
- Wayne Smith
  - Second Team All-PCAA

== Team players drafted into the NBA ==
Round	Pick	Player	NBA club
4	22	Wayne Smith	Phoenix Suns
