= Kelvin Scarborough =

American basketball player (1964–2020)

Personal information
- Born: October 8, 1964 Washington, D.C., U.S.
- Died: December 1, 2020 (aged 56) Albuquerque, New Mexico, U.S.
- Listed height: 6 ft 1 in (1.85 m)
- Listed weight: 175 lb (79 kg)

Career information
- High school: Eastern (Washington, D.C.)
- College: New Mexico (1983–1987)
- NBA draft: 1987: 6th round, 123rd overall pick
- Drafted by: Denver Nuggets
- Position: Point guard
- Number: 11

Career highlights
- First-team All-WAC (1987)
- Stats at Basketball Reference

Kelvin Scarborough (October 8, 1964 – December 1, 2020) was an American basketball player. He played college basketball at the University of New Mexico from 1983 to 1987. He was a 6' 1" point guard for the Lobos and head coach Gary Colson.

== Playing career ==
=== High school ===
Scarborough played high school basketball at Eastern High School in Washington, D.C., where he was All-Metro Conference. He was a highly sought-after recruit, noted for his quickness, penetrating ability, and perimeter shooting. He was one of the quickest Lobo players ever, as a ball handler and defender.

=== Freshman and sophomore seasons ===
The 1983-84 Lobos relied heavily on four senior starters, with only three other players contributing significant minutes, including freshman Scarborough. He appeared in 32 games, averaging 12.4 minutes and 4.2 points per game. The Lobos won at #7 UCLA on the way to a 16–4 record, but they lost three games to top ten-ranked WAC rival UTEP, then appeared in the NIT, finishing the year 24–11.

The Lobos in 1984-85 were a young squad, starting three sophomores, including Scarborough and backcourt mate Hunter Greene. Scarborough averaged 10.6 points and a team-best 5.5 assists a game. He averaged 2.5 steals per game, a Lobo season record, and his 80 steals are the second best Lobo season total. The team got off to a shaky start, at 6–5, but then won eight of nine to take a share of the WAC lead. They faltered down the stretch, however, and finished third. They returned to the NIT, where they beat Texas A&M before losing to Fresno State and finishing 19–13.

=== Junior and senior seasons ===
The Lobos had four starters returning in 1985-86 until Greene was injured in the preseason. Forward Johnny Brown turned in an All-WAC performance, but the other inside players were young, and the loss of Greene left a hole in the backcourt. Scarborough averaged 10.8 points and 4.2 rebounds a game and again led the team with 4.9 assists and 1.7 steals per game. The Lobos played well at The Pit, but they suffered mightily on the road, including blowout losses at #6 Georgetown and at Arizona. They finished fifth in the WAC but still gained an invitation to the NIT, where they lost to Texas to finish 17–14.

As a senior in 1986–87, Scarborough had his best season, averaging 18.9 points, 4.1 rebounds, and 2.2 steals a game. He led the team in assists with 6.1 per game, field goal percentage (.535), and minutes played, the third most for a season in Lobo history, and he made the third most free throws in a Lobo season. The Lobos set the still-standing team record for most steals in a season, led by Scarborough and Greene. The Lobos beat Texas and Oklahoma State as they built a 17–5 record but then lost three straight on the road in a strong year for the WAC. They then won eight straight and reached the conference tournament final, missing a last second shot and losing to Wyoming, which would go on to the Sweet Sixteen in the NCAA tournament. The WAC placed three teams in the NCAA, but the Lobos again settled for the NIT. They finished the season 25–10, the most wins for a Lobo team up to that time, and Scarborough was named first team All-WAC.

In his career at New Mexico, Scarborough tallied the most steals in Lobo history, the fourth most assists, and the fifth most minutes played. He dished out 21 assists in a single game, a Lobo record and tied with three others for second most in NCAA history, one behind the record. He was the second leading scorer in Lobo history when he finished playing, though he has now slipped to twelfth. The Lobos compiled a record of 85–48 with four NIT appearances during Scarborough's career.

=== College stats ===
| Year | Team | GP | GS | MPG | FG% | 3P% | FT% | RPG | APG | SPG | BPG | PPG |
|---|---|---|---|---|---|---|---|---|---|---|---|---|
| 1983-84 | New Mexico | 32 | 0 | 12.4 | .465 | ... | .600 | 0.9 | 1.1 | 0.8 | 0.0 | 4.2 |
| 1984-85 | New Mexico | 32 | 32 | 35.8 | .438 | ... | .760 | 3.7 | **5.5** | **2.5*** | 0.1 | 10.6 |
| 1985-86 | New Mexico | 31 | 31 | 35.1 | .502 | ... | .659 | 4.2 | **4.9** | **1.7** | 0.2 | 10.8 |
| 1986-87 | New Mexico | 35 | 34 | **37.6** | **.535** | .353 | .778 | 4.1 | **6.1** | 2.2 | 0.1 | 18.9 |
| **Career** | | 130 | 97 | 29.6 | .495 | .353 | .728 | 3.2 | 4.4 | 1.8* | 0.1 | 11.3 |

- **Bold** indicates team leader; * indicates Lobo record

== Post-college career ==
Scarborough was selected by the Denver Nuggets in the sixth round of the 1987 NBA draft, though he never played in the NBA. He played professionally from 1988 to 1993 in Australia, Hong Kong, Mexico, the Philippines, and Indonesia. He then returned to the University of New Mexico and completed his degree, in 1997.

Scarborough then devoted his career to teaching, coaching, and mentoring at-risk youth. He was boys' basketball coach at Menaul School in Albuquerque for over a decade. He also coached the New Mexico Force AAU team, as well as minor league professional teams the Las Vegas Stars and the Gallup Talons. In 1993, he formed the New Mexico All-Stars, a program that travels around the state putting on basketball and fitness camps for under-privileged youths, focused on promoting education and discouraging kids from involvement in drugs and gangs.

== Death ==
Scarborough's death from natural causes at age 56 was announced on December 1, 2020.
