= 1977–78 Utah Utes men's basketball team =

American college basketball season

1977–78 Utah Utes men's basketball

NCAA tournament, Sweet Sixteen
- Conference: Western Athletic Conference

Ranking
- Coaches: No. 18
- AP: No. 14
- Record: 23–6 (12–2 WAC)
- Head coach: Jerry Pimm (4th season)
- Home arena: Special Events Center

1977–78 WAC men's basketball standings
	Conf.				Overall
Team	W		L	PCT	W		L	PCT
No. 12 New Mexico	13	–	1	.929	24	–	4	.857
No. 14 Utah	12	–	2	.857	23	–	6	.793
Colorado State	8	–	6	.571	18	–	9	.667
Arizona	7	–	8	.467	15	–	11	.577
BYU	6	–	8	.429	12	–	18	.400
Arizona State	6	–	9	.400	13	–	14	.481
Wyoming	3	–	11	.214	12	–	15	.444
UTEP	2	–	12	.143	10	–	16	.385
Rankings from AP Poll

The 1977–78 Utah Utes men's basketball team represented the University of Utah as a member of the Western Athletic Conference during the 1977–78 college basketball season. The team was led by head coach Jerry Pimm, and played their home games at the Special Events Center in Salt Lake City, Utah.

== Roster ==
1977–78 Utah Utes men's basketball team
Players
Coaches

Pos.	#	Name	Height	Weight	Year	Hometown
F	5	Jeff Judkins	6 ft 6 in (1.98 m)	235 lb (107 kg)	Sr	Salt Lake City, Utah
F	23	Danny Vranes	6 ft 7 in (2.01 m)	205 lb (93 kg)	Fr	Salt Lake City, Utah
F/C	42	Tom Chambers	6 ft 10 in (2.08 m)	225 lb (102 kg)	Fr	Ogden, Utah

Head coach

- Jerry Pimm (Southern California)

Assistant coach(es)

Legend

- (C) Team captain
- (S) Suspended
- (I) Ineligible
- (W) Walk-on
- Injured
- Current redshirt

== Schedule and results ==
Date time, TV	Rank^{#}	Opponent^{#}	Result	Record	Site city, state
Regular season
Dec 1, 1977*		Loyola Marymount	W 85–77	1–0	Special Events Center; Salt Lake City, Utah
Dec 3, 1977*	No. 20	USC	W 93–67	2–0	Special Events Center; Salt Lake City, Utah
Dec 9, 1977*	No. 14	Kent State	W 50–47	3–0	Special Events Center; Salt Lake City, Utah
Feb 23, 1978*		No. 5 New Mexico	W 95–92	20–5 (10–2)	Special Events Center; Salt Lake City, Utah
Feb 25, 1978		UTEP	W 68–52	21–5 (11–2)	Special Events Center; Salt Lake City, Utah
Mar 4, 1978	No. 19	BYU	W 81–74	22–5 (12–2)	Special Events Center; Salt Lake City, Utah
NCAA tournament
Mar 12, 1978*	No. 14	vs. Missouri; First round	W 86–79 ^{2OT}	23–5	Levitt Arena; Wichita, Kansas
Mar 17, 1978*	No. 14	vs. No. 6 Notre Dame; Midwest Regional Semifinal – Sweet Sixteen	L 56–69	23–6	Allen Fieldhouse; Lawrence, Kansas
*Non-conference game. ^{#}Rankings from AP Poll. (#) Tournament seedings in parentheses. MW=Midwest.
