= Kendall Williams =

American basketball player (born 1991)

Free agent
- Position: Shooting guard / point guard

Personal information
- Born: July 3, 1991 (age 35) Upland, California, U.S.
- Listed height: 6 ft 4 in (1.93 m)
- Listed weight: 183 lb (83 kg)

Career information
- High school: Los Osos (Rancho Cucamonga, California)
- College: New Mexico (2010–2014)
- NBA draft: 2014: undrafted
- Playing career: 2014–present

Career history
- 2014–2015: VL Pesaro
- 2015: Fileni Jesi
- 2015–2016: Chorale Roanne Basket
- 2016: Atléticos de San Germán

Career highlights
- MWC Player of the Year (2013); 2× First-team All-MWC (2013, 2014); AP honorable mention All-American (2013)

Kendall Williams (born July 3, 1991) is an American professional basketball player who last played for Atléticos de San Germán of the Puerto Rican Baloncesto Superior Nacional (BSN). He played college basketball for the University of New Mexico.

== High school ==
Williams attended Los Osos High School in Rancho Cucamonga, California, as a three-year starter while being a first team all-state and two-time all-CIF selection for the Grizzlies. During his senior year at Los Osos, Williams averaged 22.4 points per game, 4.8 assists per game and 2.9 steals per game to go along with 7.8 rebounds per game including 40 points in a 73–75 loss against Upland High School when he was 14-of-26 from the floor and 11-of-13 from the line. Williams was also a scrappy rebounder, posting double-digit boards ten times, including 13 in a game against Vista Murrieta and another contest versus Arcadia. He also was a prolific pick-pocketer, nabbing four or more steals ten times. Williams was a spectacular student at Los Osos, maintaining a 3.7 cumulative GPA for his high school career.

== College ==
=== UCLA ===
While still a tenth-grader at Los Osos HS, Williams verbally committed to the University of California, Los Angeles to play in 2010. While there was some skepticism concerning Williams early decision to attend UCLA, The Los Angeles Times reported that "[t]hose close to Williams say they are confident that his commitment will work out for both" Williams and UCLA. However, after UCLA pulled his scholarship in late July 2009 because of concerns of coach Ben Howland over Williams's on court behavior while Howland was in attendance.

=== New Mexico ===
==== Freshman Year, 2010–2011 ====
After decommitting from UCLA in June 2009, Williams quickly found a home in New Mexico in March 2010, and blossomed into a reliable player for Steve Alford's Lobos squad. Williams scored a career-high 20 points in a 91–54 decision against Longwood University and posted his first collegiate double-double against Colorado, putting up 18 points and 11 assists in a 89–76 win. Williams also jockeyed for scoring leader for the Lobos, and consistently dished out the second most assists on the team (behind Dairese Gary). In addition, Williams both maintained one of the top six assist-to-turnover ratios (2.15 assists to turnovers) in the Mountain West Conference, and led the conference in three-point shooting percentage, both incredible feats for a true freshman. On March 7, 2011, Williams was selected as the Mountain West Conference Freshman of the Year after averaging 10.1 points per game and 3.7 assists per game. In his first collegiate postseason game, Williams led the Lobos in scoring with a 16-point performance against Colorado State in a 67–61 victory.

Games Played	Games Started	Minutes/Game	Points/Game	Rebounds/Game	Assists/Game	Ast/TO Ratio	Field Goal Percentage	3pt. Field Goal Percentage	Free Throw Percentage
35	34	30.5	11.6	3.0	4.0	1.99	45.7%	42.6%	71.8%

==== Sophomore Year, 2011–2012 ====
Prior to the start of the 2011–12 college basketball season, Williams was ranked the tenth best mid-major point guard in the nation and the seventeenth best point guard overall in the nation. Williams was also noted to be one of twenty breakout players by Ballin' is a Habit. He was also picked as a Wooden Award preseason watch list snub, and substantiated that argument by being selected to the 2011–12 Mountain West Preseason All-Conference Team. During the middle of non-conference play, Williams was named one of 65 candidates for the Bob Cousy Award, which recognizes the nation's best point guard.

Despite not having the same prolific start as during his freshman year, Williams improved upon a number of his freshman stats during his second year, including points, assists, and rebounds. Williams recorded double-digit points in 18 of the Lobos' regular-season contests, including a season-high of 21 points in wins against North Dakota and at then-No. 15 San Diego State. Another notable regular-season performance included 16 points, 7 rebounds and 7 assists in a 76–71 win at Arizona State. In the postseason, Williams continued to contribute as he scored 12.2 points per game and dished out 4.4 assists per game during the MW tournament and NCAA tournament. In the MW Championship game vs. San Diego State, a 68–59 Lobo victory, Williams tallied 14 points and six assists. In New Mexico's opening-round win versus Long Beach State in the NCAA Tournament, Williams upped his output, scoring 16 points, including a three-pointer that gave New Mexico the lead for good with under five minutes to go.

To cap off his strong sophomore campaign, Williams was named Second Team All-Mountain West and First Team All-District 17 by the National Association of Basketball Coaches.

Games Played	Games Started	Minutes/Game	Points/Game	Rebounds/Game	Assists/Game	Ast/TO Ratio	Field Goal Percentage	3pt. Field Goal Percentage	Free Throw Percentage
34	32	29.8	12.1	3.3	4.2	1.91	44.4%	35.5%	78.0%

==== Junior Year, 2012–2013 ====
Bolstered by his strong showing his sophomore year, Williams opened the 2012–13 season with a handful of preseason accolades. Williams was chosen to the Preseason All-Mountain West team for the Lobos, both by the Mountain West and by College Sports Madness. Williams also highlighted CollegeBasketballTalk's top 15 backcourts of 2012–13 season, which checked in at No. 12 as a group.

Williams started his third year with five-straight games scoring in double figures, including a then-career high total of 23 points in a victory over Illinois–Chicago at the Paradise Jam. Also at the Paradise Jam, Williams showcased some late heroics versus George Mason, where he sank a three-point basket from 33 feet with 11.9 seconds to bring New Mexico to within two points and then stole the ensuing inbounds pass that eventually led to Tony Snell's game-winning three with 1.8 seconds remaining. Williams was selected as the MVP of the Paradise Jam Tournament after averaging 17.3 points over the three contests. Williams bettered his career high in points twice more during the non-conference portion of the Lobos' schedule, as he scored 24 points in wins at Indiana State and New Mexico State. During a December contest versus South Dakota State, Williams became the 30th player in program history to score 1,000 career points after chipping in 21. He closed out non-conference play scoring in double figures all but three times, and was named to the Naismith Memorial Basketball Hall of Fame final watch list for the 2013 Bob Cousy Collegiate Point Guard of the Year Award right as conference season started. Through the first 11 games of MW play, Williams maintained a relatively low profile, scoring more than 12 points just twice. He did post an 11-point, 7-assist and 6-rebound performance versus Air Force, but statistically speaking, Williams's opening of conference play saw him average 10.5 points per game and shoot 36 percent from the floor and 28 percent from beyond the arc, all below his career marks.

===== 46 Points =====
Despite Williams's uncharacteristic output to start conference play, all was forgotten when he scored 46 points versus No. 22 Colorado State on Feb. 23, 2013. Williams accounted for more than half of the Lobos' 91 points, and shot 12-of-16 from the floor, 10-of-13 from beyond the arc and converted 12-of-17 free throws. He also added five rebounds and four assists in 33 minutes, which made his point-per-minute average 1.4. His 10 three-pointers were a New Mexico and Mountain West record, and his 46 points tied for the third-highest scoring total in school history and fifth-best in conference history. He also set the school record in most points scored in a road game, and broke the Moby Arena scoring record of 44 points set by Portland State's Freeman Williams on Nov. 29, 1975.

Williams earned considerable attention for his exploits at Moby Arena (which snapped Colorado State's 27-game home winning streak), including his first Mountain West Player of the Week honor. Also among his accolades was earning the Capital One Cup Impact Performance Of the Week and player of the week honors from ESPN's Dick Vitale, NBCSports' Rob Dauster and a handful of other media outlets like CBS Sports and FOX. Williams was also added to Jason King's Wooden Award watchlist on ESPN after his performance.

After his showing at Colorado State (which bumped in season scoring average from 13.1 points to 14.4), Williams closed out the regular season in the same fashion in which he started, tallying double figures in his last two games. In a close loss at Air Force, he recorded his second career double-double, scoring 21 points and dishing out 10 assists.

Due most in part to his 46-point game, Williams was accorded the honor of Mountain West Player of the Year, as well as a berth on the conference's First Team. It was fourth time a New Mexico player won the conference player of the year award. He was also selected to the U.S. Basketball Writers Association All-District VIII team, which includes players from all Division I schools in New Mexico, Colorado, Nevada, Montana, Idaho, Wyoming, and Utah.

Games Played	Games Started	Minutes/Game	Points/Game	Rebounds/Game	Assists/Game	Ast/TO Ratio	Field Goal Percentage	3pt. Field Goal Percentage	Free Throw Percentage
30	28	34.4	14.0	3.6	5.0	2.27	41.7%	36.2%	77.5%

== Professional career ==
After going undrafted in 2014, he signed with Victoria Libertas Pesaro of the Lega Basket Serie A where he averaged 5.6 points per game. On January 29, 2015, he signed with Fileni Jesi of the Serie A2 Basket.

On September 28, 2016, Williams signed with the London Lightning of the National Basketball League of Canada; however, he left London on October 31 to sign with Raptors 905 of the NBA Development League.

== Playing style ==
ESPN called Williams "a multifaceted, offensive player" in their January 2010 scouting report, noting his long-range skills (shooting over 45% from beyond the arc) and lane-driving capabilities. ESPN lauded Williams's "ability to handle physical play when finishing in the lane" and was called a "high major prospect" by Scouthoops.com. His defense is characterized as tenacious and has been called by UNM head coach Steve Alford one of the fastest players he has ever coached.
