= Marvin Johnson (basketball) =

American basketball player

Personal information
- Born: June 22, 1956 (age 70) DeRidder, Louisiana, U.S.
- Listed height: 6 ft 5 in (1.96 m)
- Listed weight: 190 lb (86 kg)

Career information
- High school: DeRidder (DeRidder, Louisiana)
- College: Howard County JC (1974–1976); New Mexico (1976–1978)
- NBA draft: 1978: 2nd round, 31st overall pick
- Drafted by: Chicago Bulls
- Position: Small forward
- Stats at Basketball Reference

Marvin Johnson (born June 22, 1956) is an American former basketball player who played two years for the University of New Mexico varsity under coach Norm Ellenberger. A transfer from Howard Junior College, he led the Lobos in scoring in his rookie season in 1976–77. Johnson was chosen on the second round by the Chicago Bulls in the 1978 NBA draft.

Johnson went on to play for the Solent Stars in the English league and was named the circuit's Most Valuable Player in 1981.
