= Johnny Brown (basketball) =

American basketball player and coach

Personal information
- Born: May 15, 1963 (age 62) Los Angeles, California, U.S.
- Listed height: 6 ft 6 in (1.98 m)
- Listed weight: 215 lb (98 kg)

Career information
- High school: Manual Arts (Los Angeles, California)
- College: Loyola Marymount (1981–1983); New Mexico (1984–1986)
- NBA draft: 1986: 7th round, 146th overall pick
- Drafted by: Los Angeles Clippers
- Position: Power forward
- Number: 3

Career highlights
- First-team All-WAC (1986)
- Stats at Basketball Reference

Johnny Brown (born May 15, 1963) is a retired American basketball player and long-time college basketball assistant coach. He played power forward at the University of New Mexico from 1984 to 1986 and played professionally for five seasons. He has been an assistant coach for over twenty years at several schools, currently at University of the Incarnate Word.

== Playing career ==
Brown went to Manual Arts High School in Los Angeles, then spent his first two years of college at Loyola Marymount University. As a freshman in 1981–82 he averaged seven points and six rebounds, and as a sophomore he averaged 12.5 points and led the team with 8.7 rebounds a game. LMU did not offer the major that Brown wanted to pursue, so he decided to transfer. New Mexico coach Gary Colson saw him play in a summer league in Los Angeles and offered him a scholarship. Brown then sat out the 1983–84 season per NCAA transfer rules.

Brown was a 6' 6" forward, yet he was most comfortable playing inside the lane, using muscle and position to score and rebound over taller players. He thrived on contact and scoring in traffic, especially on bank shots off the glass, calling that "maybe my best attribute." He learned to muscle inside by playing streetball with bigger players, including some who later played professionally.

Brown missed the start of his junior season, 1984–85, with a foot injury, but he had an immediate impact when he joined the New Mexico line-up, scoring 26 to lead the team to a win at rival New Mexico State. The Lobos then beat NCAA tournament-bound Arizona before facing #1 Georgetown, led by Patrick Ewing. The Lobos lost in a competitive game, with Brown and front-court mate George Scott keeping the game close despite a marked size disadvantage. Brown led Lobo scorers on the season with 18.8 points a game, adding 6.3 rebounds a game. Brown and Scott both placed among Lobo all-time leaders in field goal percentage in a season. The Lobos built a 14–6 record but then lost five of six down the stretch. They received a bid to the NIT, where they beat Texas A&M and then lost to Fresno State, finishing the season 19–13.

The Lobos in 1985–86 suffered a key injury to guard Hunter Greene in the preseason, and Scott was lost to graduation. Senior Brown led an inexperienced squad with 20.9 points and 7.5 rebounds a game. He also led the team in field goal percentage and minutes played. The Lobos played well at home but struggled badly on the road. Despite a fifth-place finish in the WAC, the Lobos again received an invitation to the NIT, where they lost to Texas and finished 17–14. Brown was named first team All-WAC.

In his Lobo career, Brown scored 1,157 points, averaging 19.9 points a game. He is one of four Lobo players to score over a thousand points while playing only two seasons, and his career average is fifth best in school history. He also finished with the fifth best career field goal percentage in Lobo history (.569) and tied for first in single-game field goal percentage, going 11-for-11 in a game against Air Force. Brown graduated from UNM with a degree in University Studies, Sociology, and Speech Communication.

Brown was selected in the seventh round of the 1986 NBA draft by the Los Angeles Clippers, though he never played in the NBA. He played for five seasons in the World Basketball League (WBL), most notably with the Las Vegas Silver Streaks. He was named to the WBL All-Defensive Team in 1988, as Las Vegas won the league championship, and he was a three-time WBL All-Star.

=== College stats ===
| Year | Team | GP | GS | MPG | FG% | 3P% | FT% | RPG | APG | SPG | BPG | PPG |
|---|---|---|---|---|---|---|---|---|---|---|---|---|
| 1981–82 | Loyola Marymount | 26 | | 24.8 | .482 | ... | .688 | 5.5 | 0.9 | 0.6 | 0.2 | 5.9 |
| 1982–83 | Loyola Marymount | 27 | | 34.5 | .542 | ... | .597 | 8.7 | 1.1 | 1.4 | 0.2 | 12.5 |
| | LMU Totals | 53 | | 29.7 | .522 | ... | .625 | 7.1 | 1.0 | 1.0 | 0.2 | 9.3 |
| 1984–85 | New Mexico | 27 | 27 | 36.4 | .587 | ... | .625 | 6.3 | 1.1 | 1.0 | 0.2 | 18.8 |
| 1985–86 | New Mexico | 31 | 31 | 37.7 | .554 | ... | .586 | 7.5 | 1.4 | 1.0 | 0.1 | 20.9 |
| | UNM Totals | 58 | 58 | 37.1 | .569 | ... | .601 | 6.9 | 1.2 | 1.0 | 0.1 | 19.9 |
| Career | | 111 | | 33.6 | .529 | ... | .606 | 7.0 | 1.1 | 1.0 | 0.2 | 14.8 |

== Coaching career ==
Brown has been coaching college basketball since 1992. He has worked at the Division I level on the staffs at Fresno State, Montana State, Northern Iowa, and Texas A&M-Corpus Christi. Brown helped lead Fresno State to NIT bids in 1996, 1997, and 1998, including a Final Four run in the last of those appearances. He left the Bulldogs to help establish the Texas A&M-Corpus Christi basketball program, which played its first season in 1999–2000. He also helped coach Eastern Oklahoma to a regional final appearance in 2001–02 and a semi-final appearance in 2003–04. Brown spent a season coaching at New Mexico Junior College, then spent five seasons at Southern Utah University. He coached at Ranger College in 2013–14, and he currently coaches at University of the Incarnate Word. Brown has coached numerous players who played professionally, including Melvin Ely and Rafer Alston. He works primarily with big men as well as with conditioning, scouting, recruiting, and on-the-floor coaching.

=== Coaching Experience ===
- Assistant Coach, University of the Incarnate Word, 2015–present
- Assistant Coach, Ranger College, 2013–2014
- Assistant Coach, Southern Utah, 2007–2012
- Assistant Coach, New Mexico Jr. College, 2006–07
- Assistant Coach, Montana State, 2004–06
- Assistant Coach, Eastern Oklahoma, 2003–04
- Assistant Coach, Binghamton, 2002–03
- Assistant Coach, Eastern Oklahoma, 2001–02
- Assistant Coach, Northern Iowa, 2000–01
- Assistant Coach, Texas A&M Corpus Christi, 1998–2000
- Assistant Coach, Fresno State, 1994–98
- Assistant Coach, Cal Poly, 1992–93
