= Bob King (basketball) =

American basketball player and coach (1923–2004)

Biographical details
- Born: August 24, 1923; Gravity, Iowa, U.S.
- Died: December 10, 2004 (aged 81); Albuquerque, New Mexico, U.S.

Coaching career (HC unless noted)
- 1960–1962: Iowa (assistant)
- 1962–1972: New Mexico
- 1975–1978: Indiana State

Administrative career (AD unless noted)
- 1973–1981: Indiana State

Head coaching record
- Overall: 236–113

Accomplishments and honors

Championships
- 2 WAC (1964, 1968)

Awards
- University of New Mexico Athletics Hall of Honor (1987); Indiana State University Athletics Hall of Fame (1999); MVC Athletics Hall of Fame (2014)

Bob King (August 24, 1923 – December 10, 2004) was an American college basketball coach and administrator. He was head coach at the University of New Mexico from 1962 to 1972 and at Indiana State University from 1975 to 1978. He also served as Assistant Athletics Director at New Mexico (1972–73) and Athletics Director at Indiana State (1974–80).

King coached basketball Hall of Famers Larry Bird, Mel Daniels, and Don Nelson. The success of his New Mexico teams led to the construction of The Pit, the home venue of the Lobos, and its court is named after him. He also assembled the Indiana State team that went to the 1979 NCAA Final Four and lost in the championship game. Both schools have inducted King into their Athletics Halls of Fame, as has the Missouri Valley Conference.

== Early career ==
King was born in Gravity, Iowa, where he was an All-State basketball player in high school. He lettered in baseball as a freshman at the University of Iowa before graduating in three years with a bachelor's degree in Physical Education in 1947. He earned a master's degree in Educational Guidance and Psychology from Drake University in 1957. King coached for 12 seasons at Britt High School and Algona High School in Iowa and Rockford West High School in Rockford, Illinois. King led Rockford West to three consecutive Regional championships from 1957 to 1959, while compiling an overall high school record of 205–75. King then returned to his alma mater and became an assistant coach at Iowa for two seasons (1960–62) under Sharm Scheuerman. At Iowa, King coached two-time All-American, NBA player and Hall of Fame coach Don Nelson, who became the all-time leader in NBA coaching victories.

== University of New Mexico ==
King was hired as head coach of the New Mexico Lobos in 1962. The Lobo program had gone 42–149 (.220) over the previous eight seasons and had only two winning seasons in the previous fifteen years. King transformed the program immediately, winning more games in his first two seasons than the team had won in the previous six combined. In ten seasons as Lobo head coach, King compiled a record of 175–89 (.663), the second most coaching wins in team history, with two Western Athletic Conference (WAC) titles, three appearances in the National Invitation Tournament (NIT), and the school's first NCAA tournament bid.

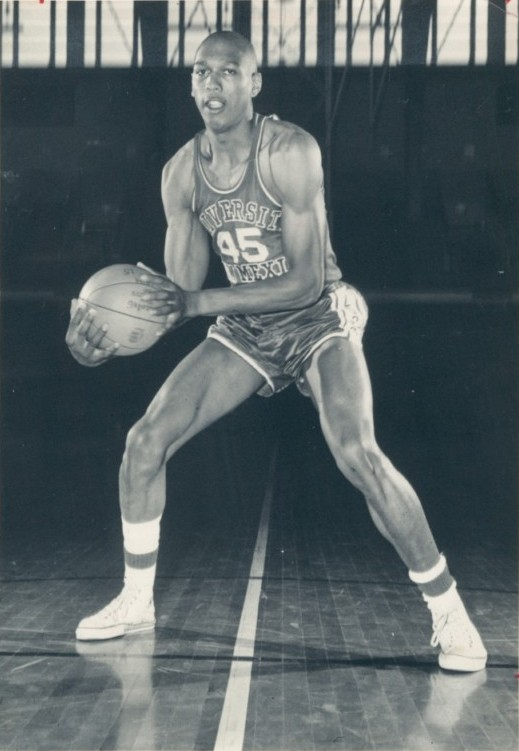
Mel Daniels

King instilled fundamental principles of the game, running a disciplined offense and a relentless, pressure defense, building his early teams around dominant centers. His first Lobo squad was led by future ABA-standout Ira Harge, who transferred to New Mexico from a Junior College in Iowa. The Lobos went 16–9 in their first season under King. In 1963–64, they won the WAC championship for the first time and went to the NIT in New York City. They defeated Drake and upset NYU before losing in the championship game to Bradley, finishing the season 23–6, the most wins in program history at that point. Harge averaged 19 points and 12 rebounds as a Lobo and was honored as "the most prolific scorer in the history of the school" at the time.

King next signed center Mel Daniels, one of the greatest players in Lobo history. Daniels averaged 20 points and 11 rebounds a game as a three-year starter (1964–67), leading the team to a combined 54–24 record and two more NIT appearances. Daniels went on to become an ABA All-Time Team member after winning two MVP awards and three championships with the Indiana Pacers. In 2012, he was inducted into the Basketball Hall of Fame. After his playing career, Daniels joined King's staff at Indiana State as an assistant, and he later worked in the Pacers front office for over twenty years.

The Lobos entered the national rankings for the first time and spent a total of 52 weeks in the rankings during King's tenure. The team became wildly popular in Albuquerque, attendance at their games more than doubled, and soon their home venue was selling out regularly. University Arena, now formally known as Dreamstyle Arena but popularly known as "The Pit", opened at the beginning of the 1966–67 season and has become one of the most renowned college basketball arenas in the country. Attendance at The Pit was second in the nation in its first year and has remained among national leaders ever since, and the Lobos have won over eighty percent of their games there.

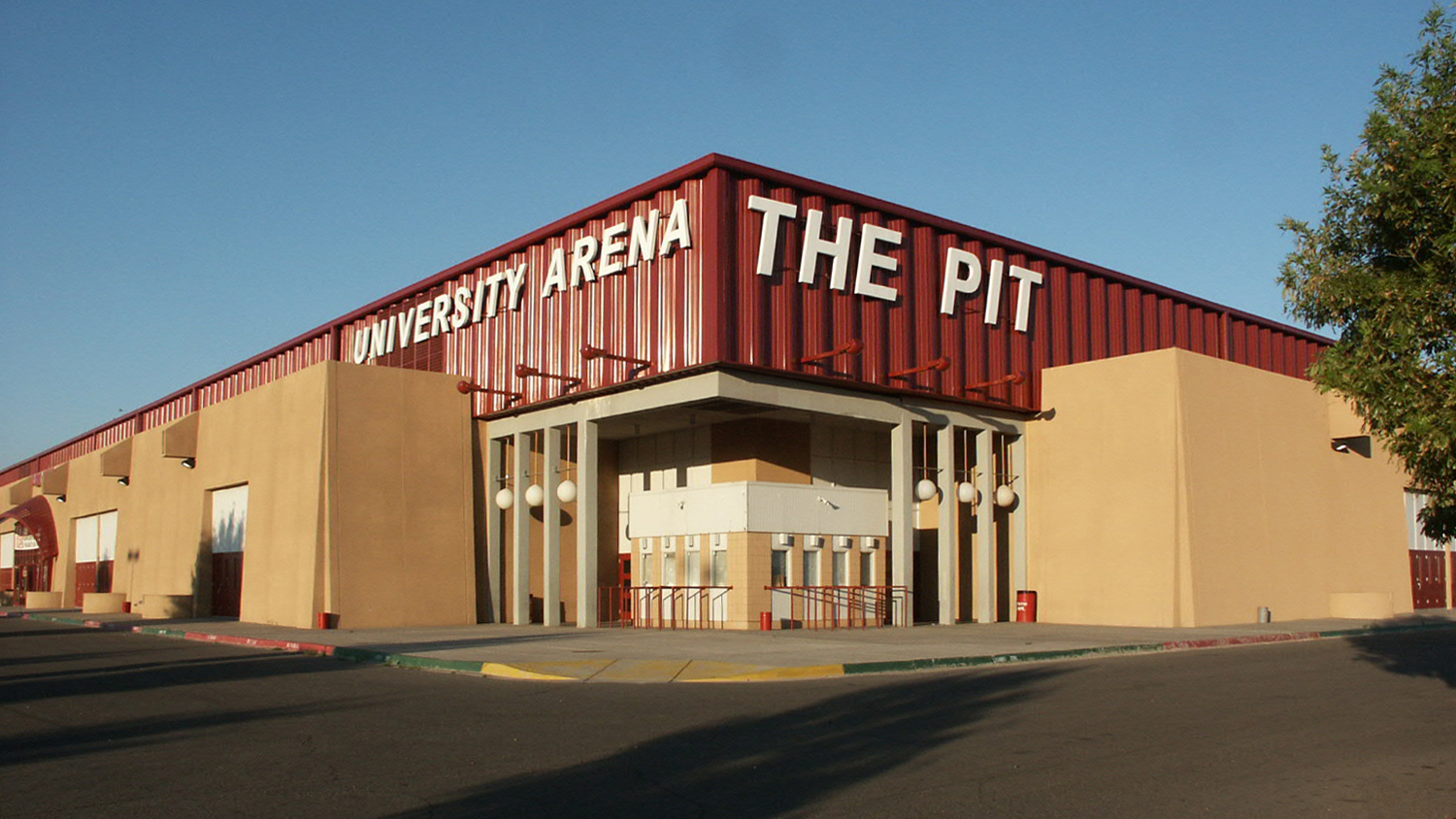
The Pit

During the same period, Lobo rivals UTEP and New Mexico State also attained national prominence. UTEP (then Texas Western) won the national championship in 1966, and New Mexico State reached the Final Four in 1970. A fierce rivalry developed among King, Miners coach Don Haskins, and Aggies coach Lou Henson. Their teams each played one another twice a season, often with national rankings at stake.

The 1967–68 Lobos had lost Daniels to graduation, and they were picked in preseason polls to finish last in the WAC. Instead they bolted to a 17–0 start, climbing into the national rankings. The team was the most balanced squad King had at New Mexico, with four players averaging in double-figures, led by Ron Nelson with 19.5 points per game. The Lobos beat #5 Utah and #10 New Mexico State, surging to #4 in the polls. They won the WAC conference, and Nelson was honored as All-WAC and a Helms All-American. The Lobos received their first bid to the NCAA tournament, playing in the regionals at The Pit. They were upset by Santa Clara, however, and finished the season 23–5.

The focus on inside play returned the next season as Willie Long began his run as a three-year starter. The team finished 17–9 but failed to reach the post-season. Long averaged 23.9 points a game in both his final two seasons, earning All-WAC recognition both years and Helms All-American status as a senior. Like Harge and Daniels, Long went on to play in the ABA. The Lobos slumped to a 42–36 record in King's final three seasons as head coach, with no postseason appearances.

King stepped down as coach after the 1971–72 season, becoming Assistant Athletics Director at UNM the next year. He had hoped to take over as Athletics Director, as the current AD was set to retire in 1973, but after he was passed over for the job, perhaps due to state politics, King resigned.

== Indiana State University ==
King was hired as Athletics Director at Indiana State, serving from 1974 to 1980, transforming the program and leading it to national prominence. Under King the ISU football program elevated to Division I status, and the school joined the Missouri Valley Conference (MVC). The men's gymnastics team was NCAA co-champion in 1977, producing Olympian Kurt Thomas, and four-time Olympic medalist Bruce Baumgartner wrestled for the ISU team.

King was head coach of the ISU basketball team for three seasons, from 1975 through 1978. King and assistant coach Bill Hodges recruited Larry Bird, who had started school the previous year at Indiana University but quit before basketball season began. Bird had been working for the public works department in his hometown, among other odd jobs, while also playing in AAU league games and tournaments. Hodges was persistent, showing up at Bird's house and jobs, trying to convince him to return to college ball. King and Hodges went to see Bird play in an AAU all-star game. King noticed scratches on Bird's arms and correctly guessed that he had been putting up hay all day. Bird finished with 43 points and 25 rebounds, and King convinced him to visit ISU for a tryout. Bird enrolled for the fall semester but sat out the 1975–76 season due to NCAA transfer rules. The Sycamores went 13–12. Bird practiced with the team, and rumors began to circulate that the red-shirt squad was beating the starters.

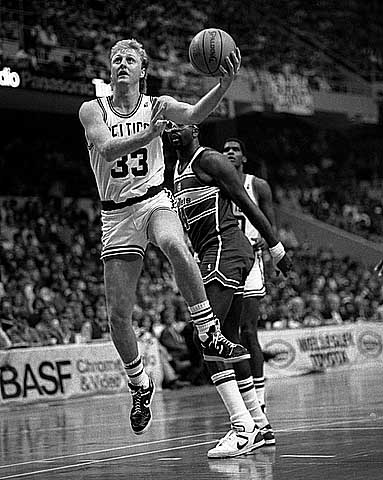
Bird with the Boston Celtics

Bird began his ISU career year with a flourish, scoring over 30 points in his first games, later scoring 47 points with 19 rebounds against Butler. The Sycamores had joined the MVC but were not eligible for the conference title, and they dominated a schedule of mostly independents. Bird averaged 32.8 points and 13.3 rebounds a game, leading the team to a 25–2 regular season record. Sports Illustrated put him on its cover and called him "College Basketball’s Secret Weapon." Attendance surged and ISU recorded its first ever sold-out home games. The Sycamores were ranked #16 and received their first post-season invitation as a Division I school, playing at Houston in the NIT. They lost in the closing seconds, 83–82, despite 44 points and 14 boards from Bird, finishing the season 25–3.

The Sycamores began the 1977–78 season 13–0, including a blowout over Purdue. They then lost five straight, struggling on the road in the MVC. The team finished the season strong, winning eight out of ten but losing at Creighton in the conference tournament final. They again received a bid to the NIT, where they beat Illinois State in the first round before losing at Rutgers, 57–56, finishing the season 23–9. Bird averaged 30 points and 11.5 rebounds and was named a first team UPI All-American.

Shortly before practices for the 1978–79 season started, King suffered a heart attack followed by a brain aneurysm and was forced to relinquish his coaching duties. Hodges took over, but King continued to contribute as the coaches met regularly during the season. Hodges especially valued King's input on defense, where his innovative scheme was later adopted by Bob Knight at Indiana. The team completed its pre-conference schedule undefeated, including a win at eventual Big Ten champion Purdue, and they climbed into the national rankings. Early in the conference season, Hodges had become frustrated with opponents breaking the ISU press and asked King to attend practice. King recommended an adjustment that led to immediate improvement and a series of tough conference wins.

King could have returned to the sidelines at some point, but he continued to have short-term memory problems. He attended most Sycamore home games but was not up to traveling. He made an exception for the MVC road game to New Mexico State, where he still had a number of friends. The game, played before a record crowd in Las Cruces, turned out to be one of the biggest scares of the season for the Sycamores. Bird and two other starters fouled out, and the Aggies held a two-point lead with time running out. ISU sixth man Bob Heaton hit a half court desperation shot at the buzzer to send the game into overtime, and the Sycamores edged the Aggies in the extra period. ISU players hoisted Hodges onto their shoulders in celebration, but he reached down and embraced King.

The Sycamores rose to #1 in the national rankings and completed the regular season 26–0. Bird averaged 28.6 points, 14.9 rebounds, and 5.5 assists a game. Junior PG Carl Nicks added 19.3 points and five assists a game. King had encouraged Nicks to transfer to a junior college for his sophomore season to hone his game, and the strategy had paid off. (As a senior the next season, Nicks averaged 26.8 points a game, and he later played professionally for several years.) ISU swept through the MVC tournament, winning the championship game over New Mexico State.

The Sycamores received a one-seed in the NCAA tournament . They beat Virginia Tech and Oklahoma handily, then edged #5 Arkansas to reach the Final Four. They beat #6 DePaul in the semi-final game, advancing to the NCAA championship game against #3 Michigan State at 33–0. The Spartans were led by Magic Johnson, and the game became one of the most memorable finals in NCAA basketball history, sparking a surge of interest in the NCAA tournament. The Spartans won, and Bird and Johnson continued their intense rivalry over the next decade in the NBA.

Hodges was named National Coach of the Year. He honored King, stating, "The two greatest things a man can give another are knowledge and a chance. Bob King gave me both." Former New Mexico great Mel Daniels was also an assistant coach on the ISU staff. Years later, Daniels, Bird, and Nicks would be reunited on the coaching staff and front office of the Indiana Pacers.

King continued as ISU Athletics Director until he retired in 1980. He compiled a head coaching record of 61–24 (.718) at ISU, the third best winning percentage in school history (John Wooden is first at .746), and the eighth most coaching wins. King was inducted into the Indiana State University Athletics Hall of Fame in 1999 and the Missouri Valley Conference Hall of Fame in 2014.

== Retirement ==
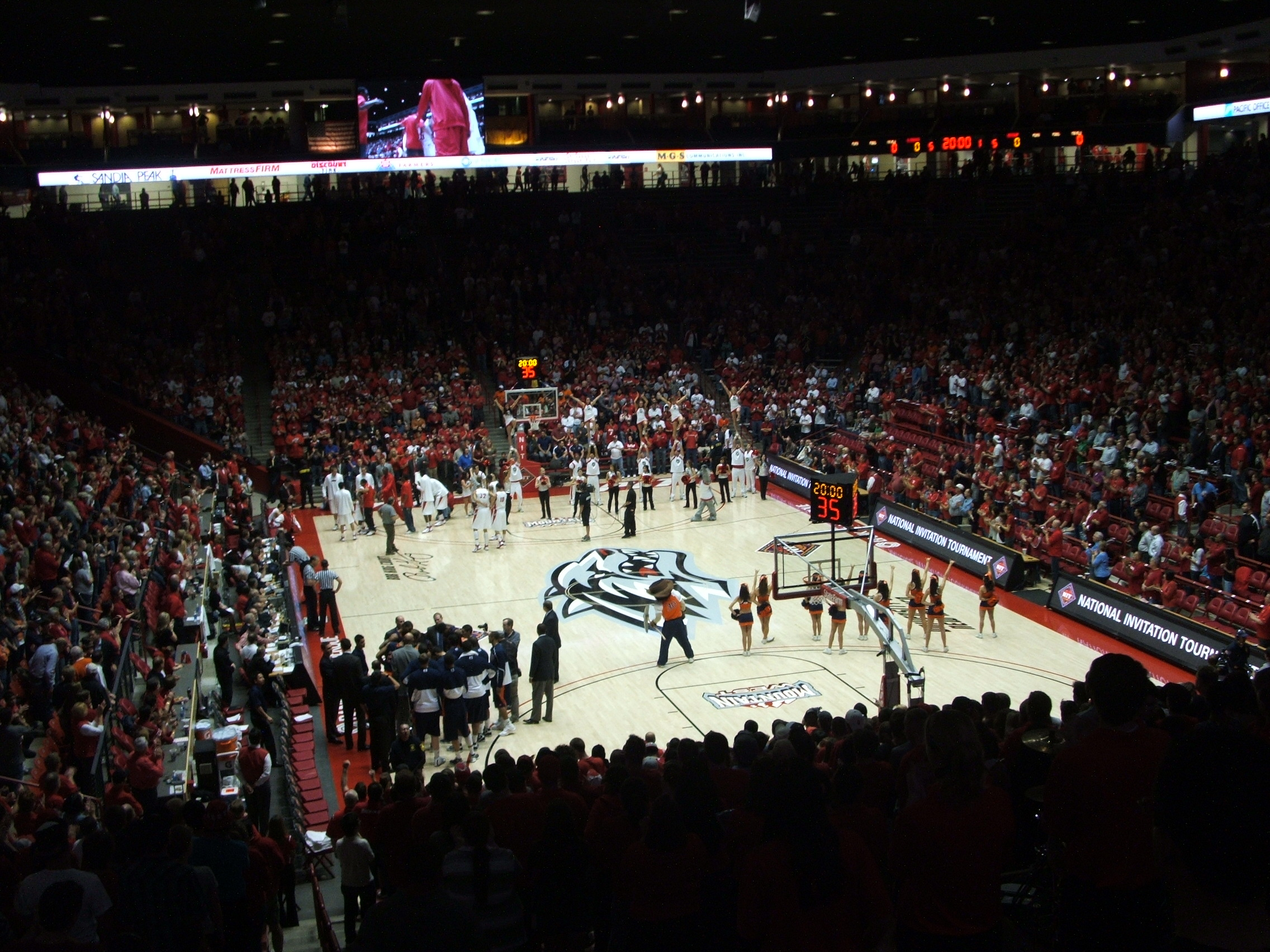
Bob King Court at The Pit

In thirteen seasons as a head coach, King compiled an overall record of 236–113 (.676), taking five teams to the NIT and one team to the NCAA Tournament. His teams won over 20 games four times, and he never had a losing season in his career.

In 1981 King returned to New Mexico, where he lived in Albuquerque and Belen and regularly attended Lobo games at The Pit. He was inducted into the New Mexico Sports Hall of Fame in 1982 and the University of New Mexico Athletics Hall of Honor in 1987. In a formal ceremony on December 1, 1992, the basketball court at The Pit was dedicated and named Bob King Court in honor of the man known as the “Architect of Lobo Basketball.”

King died in Albuquerque on December 10, 2004, survived by his wife, four sons, and two daughters. A public memorial service was held at The Pit, attended by hundreds of mourners and former players, including Bird, Daniels, Harge, and Ron Nelson. Nelson praised King for his integrity and discipline, qualities he instilled in his players. Daniels and Harge credited King for caring about his players and teaching them life lessons beyond the game. Daniels noted how King had taught him to prepare, on the court and in the classroom, and that he treated his players with respect, which they readily returned. Harge stated, "Bob King did more for me than anybody in my life." Bird said King "was instrumental in the success of my career. I will always be grateful for his friendship, guidance, and help. Coach King was more than a coach; he was a dear friend and mentor."

== Head coaching record ==
Record table
Season	Team	Overall	Conference	Standing	Postseason
New Mexico Lobos (Western Athletic Conference) (1962–1972)
1962–63	New Mexico	16–9	4–6	4th	
1963–64	New Mexico	23–6	7–3	T–1st	NIT Runner-up
1964–65	New Mexico	19–8	5–5	T–2nd	NIT Second Round
1965–66	New Mexico	16–8	4–6	5th	
1966–67	New Mexico	19–8	5–5	T–3rd	NIT Second Round
1967–68	New Mexico	23–5	8–2	1st	NCAA University Division Regional Fourth Place
1968–69	New Mexico	17–9	4–6	T–5th	
1969–70	New Mexico	13–13	7–7	T–5th	
1970–71	New Mexico	14–12	7–7	7th	
1971–72	New Mexico	15–11	7–7	T4th	
New Mexico:		175–89 (.663)	58–54 (.518)		
Indiana State Sycamores (Missouri Valley Conference) (1975–1978)
1975–76	Indiana State	13–12			
1976–77	Indiana State	25–3			NIT First Round
1977–78	Indiana State	23–9	11–5	T–2nd	NIT Second Round
Indiana State:		61–24 (.718)	11–5 (.688)		
Total:		236–113 (.676)			
National champion Postseason invitational champion Conference regular season champion Conference regular season and conference tournament champion Division regular season champion Division regular season and conference tournament champion Conference tournament champion
