= Willie Long =

American basketball player

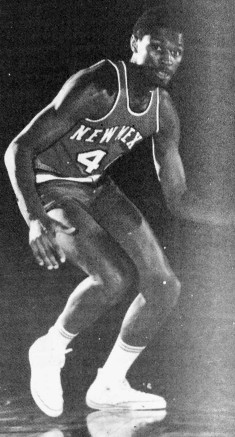
- Long as a member of the New Mexico Lobos men's basketball team, circa 1971

Personal information
- Born: March 1, 1950 (age 76) Fort Wayne, Indiana, U.S.
- Listed height: 6 ft 8 in (2.03 m)
- Listed weight: 225 lb (102 kg)

Career information
- High school: South Side (Fort Wayne, Indiana)
- College: New Mexico (1968–1971)
- NBA draft: 1971: 2nd round, 35th overall pick
- Drafted by: Cleveland Cavaliers
- Playing career: 1971–1974
- Position: Small forward / power forward
- Number: 30

Career history
- 1971–1972: The Floridians
- 1972–1974: Denver Rockets

Career highlights
- 2× First-team All-WAC (1970, 1971); Fourth-team Parade All-American (1967); Indiana Mr. Basketball (1967)
- Stats at Basketball Reference

Willie Long (born March 1, 1950) is an American former professional basketball player.

Long starred at South Side High School in Fort Wayne, Indiana, where he earned Indiana Mr. Basketball honors in 1967 after averaging 25.6 points per game. He led the Archers to the state finals, losing in the semi-finals to traditional Indiana power Lafayette Jefferson. As a junior, he led the Archers to an IHSAA Regional title (the equivalent of the Sweet Sixteen).

Long played college basketball at the University of New Mexico under head coach Bob King. Long was the leading scorer for the Lobos in 1969-70 and 1970–71, averaging 23.9 points a game both seasons, leading the Western Athletic Conference in scoring as a senior. He amassed 1,542 career points and 800 rebounds, averaging 20 points and 10 rebounds a game, ranking #10 in Lobo history in points scored and #4 in rebounds. He was selected All-WAC in 1969-70 and 1970–71 and a Helms All-American in 1970–71.

Long was selected by the Cleveland Cavaliers in the second round of the 1971 NBA draft, but he never played in the NBA. He instead spent three seasons in the American Basketball Association with The Floridians and the Denver Rockets. In 213 games over his professional career, he averaged 11.4 points and 6.0 rebounds per game.

In 1999 Long was inducted into the Indiana Basketball Hall of Fame.

Long later became an executive with Taco Bell, based in Atlanta.
