= Dairese Gary =

American basketball player (born 1988)

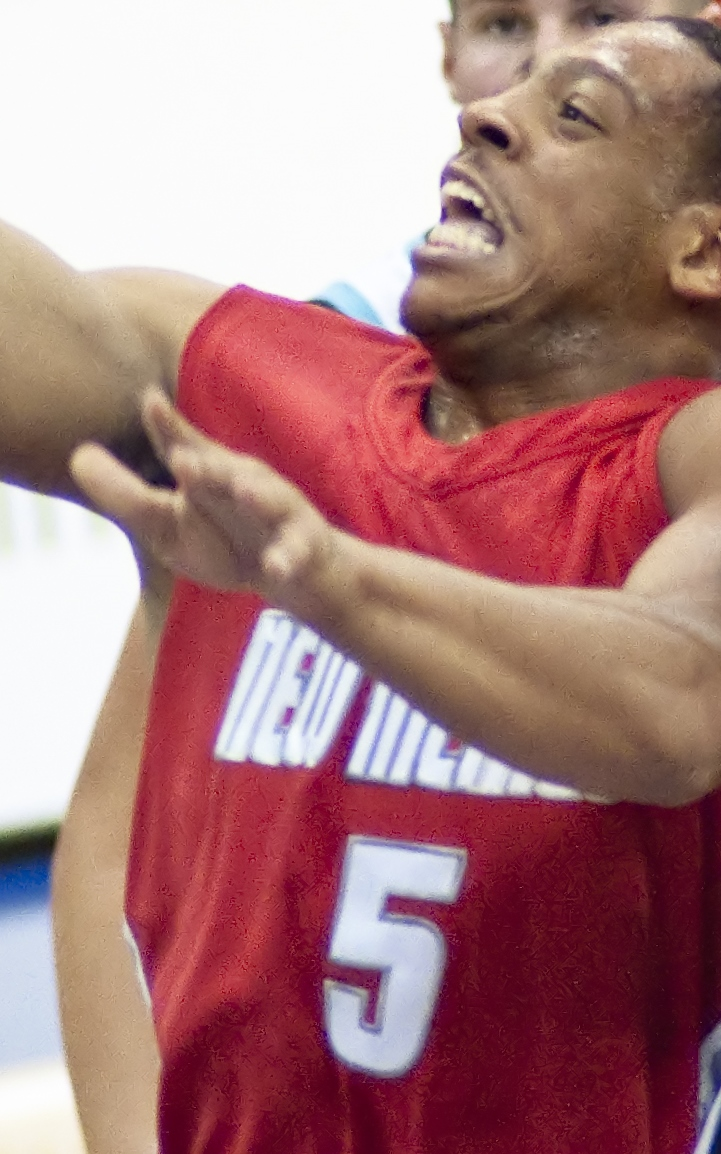
- Gary with New Mexico in 2009

Personal information
- Born: October 21, 1988 (age 38) Elkhart, Indiana, U.S.
- Listed height: 6 ft 1 in (1.85 m)
- Listed weight: 205 lb (93 kg)

Career information
- High school: Concord (Elkhart, Indiana)
- College: New Mexico (2007–2011)
- NBA draft: 2011: undrafted
- Playing career: 2012–2016
- Position: Point guard

Career history
- 2012–2014: Fort Wayne Mad Ants
- 2014–2015: Somouha Alexandria
- 2015–2016: Al Fateh

Career highlights
- 2x First-team All-MWC (2010, 2011)

Dairese Layton Gary (born October 21, 1988, pronounced da-REECE) is a former American professional basketball player. He played college basketball at New Mexico, where he was named first-team All-MWC in 2010 and 2011.

== High school career ==
Gary attended Concord High School in Elkhart, Indiana, lettering in basketball and football. During his junior year at Concord, Gary led the team to the sectional title, averaging 22.3 points, four rebounds, and two assists per game while guiding Concord to a 22–2 record. During his senior year, he led Concord back to another winning record, 13–7, while compiling 21.8 points, 4.3 rebounds, 3.9 assists and 1.8 steals per game. He shot 56.3% from the floor, 34.7% from three-point range and 69.0% from the foul line during his senior season. He finished his high school career scoring 1,330 points (ninth all-time at Concord) and as a two-time first team all-area selection, enough to garner a three-star rating from Scout.com. He verbally committed to play for Steve Alford at Iowa as a sophomore, but signed a letter of intent at New Mexico after Alford was hired at the school. "I don't know much about (New Mexico), I know it's warm," he said. Gary's nickname is "Little Bus” because of a resemblance to former NFL running back Jerome “The Bus” Bettis.

== College career ==
=== Freshman year, 2007–2008 ===
Gary started the last 28 games as the team's point guard, the most starts at from a freshman at point guard in nearly ten years. Gary led the Lobos in assists (as well as being eighth in the Mountain West Conference and first among all MWC newcomers) and was second on the team in steals. Gary posted a season-high 18 points in an 80–63 victory over Texas Tech on December 15, connecting on all four of his 3-point attempts. On February 13, 2008, he scored 12 points in a 73–63 win at San Diego State. Due to his freshman success, CollegeHoops.net named Gary and honorable mention High-Major All-Freshman after helping the J. R. Giddens-led team to a 24–9 record, including an NIT berth.

Games played	Games started	Minutes/Game	Points/Game	Rebounds/Game	Assists/Game	Field goal percentage	3pt. field goal percentage	Free throw percentage
33	28	23.5	7.8	2.3	3.2	44.5%	39.1%	73.9%

=== Sophomore year, 2008–2009 ===
After a year as the team's starting point guard, Gary's role was more defined as he began flourishing in his new role, being the only player to start every game. He was second in the Mountain West Conference in assists, fifth in assist-to-turnover ratio, and ninth in steals. Along with players like junior Roman Martinez, and seniors Daniel Faris, Chad Toppert and Tony Danridge, the Lobos posted a 22–12 record and an NIT berth, advancing to the second round where Gary put up 15 points, four assists, and a pair of steals in a losing effort to Notre Dame. Gary was also instrumental in a late season victory against Colorado State, putting up 18 points (all after halftime), eight assists, and four rebounds in an 81–79 double-overtime win.

Games played	Games started	Minutes/Game	Points/Game	Rebounds/Game	Assists/Game	Field goal percentage	3pt. field goal percentage	Free throw percentage
34	34	23.9	8.1	2.2	4.1	43.6%	39.2%	72.1%

=== Junior year, 2009–2010 ===
After the departure of Faris, Toppert and Danridge, the burden of leading the New Mexico team to success fell on the shoulders of Roman Martinez, Darington Hobson, and Gary. They posted a 12-game winning streak in which Gary posted five games scoring double figures, including a 21-point, 4-assist, 4-rebound game at San Diego on December 9. Despite their preseason fifth-place rank in the Mountain West Conference, the Lobos won 14 straight in the conference, with Gary averaging 14.1 points and 4.4 rebounds during the streak, including 23 points or greater in three games (BYU twice and Colorado State). Gary was honored for his play by being named first-team all-Mountain West and part of the all-defensive team in the Mountain West Conference.

Games played	Games started	Minutes/Game	Points/Game	Rebounds/Game	Assists/Game	Field goal percentage	3pt. field goal percentage	Free throw percentage
35	35	28.6	13.1	2.8	3.9	45.0%	34.1%	75.0%

=== Senior Year, 2010–2011 ===
The 2010-2011 Lobos returned few upperclassmen, including only one senior (Gary) and three juniors. Gary, a preseason all-conference member, led the Lobos in points and assists. Gary had a double-double (14 points and 10 assists) against then-ranked No. 9 BYU in an 86–77 win in The Pit on January 30, 2011. Steve Alford said after the game: “In the end, it’s that one guy again, Dairese Gary. He plays all 40 minutes, he’s guarding the best player (Fredette) on the other team. This is what Dairese has done his entire career, and we’re seeing a very special player come into the last half of his (final season).” Gary followed that performance by posting career-highs in points in back-to-back games against UNLV and TCU, putting up 26 and 32 points, respectively. Like his junior year, Gary was honored by being named first-team all-Mountain West and part of the all-defensive team in the Mountain West. However, in a semifinals game in a Mountain West Conference men's basketball tournament game against BYU, Gary tore his ACL, ending his collegiate career. He averaged 14.1 points per game. Gary is 13th in career scoring at New Mexico with 1,458 points, and is 4th in assists with 564. After the season, he was arrested for driving while intoxicated, a week after teammate Chad Adams was arrested for the same offense.

Games played	Games started	Minutes/Game	Points/Game	Rebounds/Game	Assists/Game	Field goal percentage	3pt. field goal percentage	Free throw percentage
33	33	33.8	14.1	3.2	5.5	48.2%	33.7%	78.0%

== Professional career ==
Gary was forced to sit out the season after his injury and became a graduate assistant for the Lobos. Gary was selected by the Los Angeles D-Fenders in the first round (16th overall pick) of the 2012 NBA D-League draft. He was immediately traded to the Fort Wayne Mad Ants. "It feels good to be a member of the Ft. Wayne Mad Ants," said Gary. "And it feels great be able to play basketball again, especially for my home state and in front of my family." In 2014, he was picked up by Somouha Alexandria in the Egyptian league.
