= Hunter Greene (basketball) =

American basketball player (born 1965)

Personal information
- Listed height: 6 ft 6 in (1.98 m)

Career information
- High school: Van Nuys (Van Nuys, California)
- College: New Mexico (1983–1988)
- NBA draft: 1988: undrafted
- Position: Shooting guard / small forward
- Number: 21

Career highlights
- 2× Second-team All-WAC (1987, 1988)

Hunter Greene (born 1965) is an American basketball player who played college basketball at the University of New Mexico from 1983 to 1988. At 6' 6" he played primarily guard and wing. He was a versatile all-around player, accomplished scorer, and strong defender for the Lobos and head coach Gary Colson. He finished his career as the leading scorer in Lobo history, though he has since fallen to eighth, and he holds the school record for most steals in a season.

He has served as a color analyst on broadcasts of Lobo basketball games on KKOB radio since 2014.

== Early life ==
He was born in 1965 in Los Angeles, California.

== Career ==
=== Early years ===
Greene played high school basketball at Van Nuys High School, where he was 3A Player of the Year in Southern California as a senior in 1982–83, averaging 26 points and 14 rebounds per game. He only began playing organized basketball as a sophomore in high school, and he played sparingly in his first year at New Mexico, averaging 1.4 points in 25 game appearances. He continued developing his skills in a pro-am circuit summer league in Los Angeles, getting more comfortable as a guard and shooter.

The summer league work paid off, and as a sophomore, in 1984–85, Greene became a starter for the Lobos, averaging 11.4 points and 4.3 rebounds a game. Greene shared backcourt duties with fellow sophomore Kelvin Scarborough, and the young Lobo squad went 19–13 with an appearance in the NIT. Four starters were returning for the 1985–86 season, but Greene was injured during a preseason practice and missed the season.

=== Junior and senior seasons ===
Greene returned for his junior year in 1986–87 to lead New Mexico with 21.1 points and 6.2 rebounds a game. The team set the Lobo season record for most steals, and Greene set the individual Lobo record for number of steals in a season (84). Scarborough averaged 18.9 points and six assists and set the Lobo career record for steals. The Lobos beat Texas and Oklahoma State and built a 17–5 record before losing three straight on the road in a strong year for the WAC. They then won eight straight and reached the conference tournament final, missing a last second shot and losing to Wyoming, which would go on to the Sweet Sixteen in the NCAA tournament. The WAC placed three teams in the NCAA, but the Lobos settled for the NIT. They finished the season 25–10, the most wins for a Lobo team up to that time.

Greene was a versatile player who maintained a composed countenance on the court, leading quietly by example. As a senior, he averaged 16.8 points and 6.8 rebounds and again led the team in steals. His most memorable moment came in a game named by a panel of writers as the top game ever at The Pit, the home venue of the Lobos, as New Mexico was hosting #1 Arizona, led by All-Americans Sean Elliott and Steve Kerr. The Lobos built an early 25–9 lead, and the Wildcats slowly came back. Elliott had a chance to put Arizona into the lead with seconds left, but Greene blocked the shot to seal the win, the only time the Lobos have beaten a #1-ranked team. New Mexico beat #5 Wyoming a week later and climbed into the rankings at #19. They fell into a 6–10 slide, however, struggling badly on the road. They again went to the NIT, where they won two games before losing in the quarter-finals to finish the season 22–14.

Greene finished his career as the leading scorer in Lobo history, with 1,745 points, though he has since fallen to eighth, and he is third in career steals, behind Scarborough and Jaelen House. He is the only Lobo ever to surpass 1,500 points, 600 rebounds, 300 assists, and 200 steals. The Lobos went 90–48 during his four years, with four NIT appearances.

=== Career stats ===
Year	Team	GP	GS	MPG	FG%	3P%	FT%	RPG	APG	SPG	BPG	PPG
1983–84	New Mexico	25	0	7.0	.361	...	.800	0.9	0.4	0.3	0.1	1.4
1984–85	New Mexico	32	31	31.8	.480	...	.770	4.3	3.3	1.3	0.3	11.4
1986–87	New Mexico	35	35	35.4	.463	.356	**.786**	**6.2**	3.0	**2.4***	0.7	**21.1**
1987–88	New Mexico	36	36	**33.6**	.435	.279	**.808**	6.8	3.8	**1.9**	0.3	16.8
**Career**		128	102	28.4	.455	.316	.792	4.9	2.8	1.6	0.4	13.6

- **Bold** indicates team leader; * School record for steals in a season (84)

== Post-playing career ==
Greene graduated in 1988 with a degree in communications from the University of New Mexico. After his playing career, he became a sales representative and then went into commercial real estate in Albuquerque. In 2022, he became partner of a venture investment firm.

He has also worked as a color analyst on broadcasts of Lobo basketball games on KKOB radio since 2014.

== Personal life ==
His wife Rita Santiago-Greene died of cancer in 2005. They had three children together.
