= 1977–78 Villanova Wildcats men's basketball team =

American college basketball season

1977–78 Villanova Wildcats men's basketball

EAA Regular season champions EAA Tournament champions

NCAA Men's Division I Tournament, Elite Eight
- Conference: Eastern Athletic Association
- Record: 23–9 (7–3 EAA)
- Head coach: Rollie Massimino (5th season)
- Assistant coach: Mitch Buonaguro (1st season)
- Home arena: Villanova Field House

1977–78 Eastern 8 men's basketball standings
	Conf.				Overall
Team	W		L	PCT	W		L	PCT
East
Rutgers	7	–	3	.700	24	–	7	.774
Villanova †	7	–	3	.700	23	–	9	.719
Pittsburgh	5	–	5	.500	16	–	11	.593
UMass	5	–	5	.500	15	–	12	.556
West
Duquesne	5	–	5	.500	11	–	17	.393
George Washington	4	–	6	.400	15	–	11	.577
Penn State	4	–	6	.400	8	–	19	.296
West Virginia	3	–	7	.300	12	–	16	.429
† 1978 Eastern 8 Tournament winner Rankings from AP Poll

The 1977–78 Villanova Wildcats men's basketball team represented Villanova University during the 1977–78 NCAA Division I men's basketball season. The head coach was Rollie Massimino. The team played its home games at Villanova Field House in Villanova, Pennsylvania, and was a member of the Eastern Athletic Association (EAA). The team won the regular season EAA title and reached the Elite Eight of the NCAA tournament before falling to Duke. Villanova finished with a 23–9 record (7–3 Big East).

== Roster ==
1977–78 Villanova Wildcats men's basketball team
Players
Coaches

Pos.	#	Name	Height	Weight	Year	Hometown
G	3	Rory Sparrow	6 ft 2 in (1.88 m)	—	So	Paterson, New Jersey
F	33	Keith Herron	6 ft 6 in (1.98 m)	—	Sr	Washington, D.C.
F	44	Alex Bradley	6 ft 6 in (1.98 m)	205 lb (93 kg)	Fr	Long Branch, New Jersey

Head coach

- Rollie Massimino (Vermont)

Assistant coach(es)

- Mitch Buonaguro (Boston College)

Legend

- (C) Team captain
- (S) Suspended
- (I) Ineligible
- (W) Walk-on
- Injured
- Current redshirt

== Schedule and results ==
Date time, TV	Rank^{#}	Opponent^{#}	Result	Record	Site city, state
Regular season
Nov 27, 1977*		Merrimack	W 102–70	1–0	Villanova Field House; Villanova, Pennsylvania
Nov 30, 1977*		Philadelphia Textile	W 61–57	2–0	Villanova Field House; Villanova, Pennsylvania
Dec 3, 1977		at West Virginia	W 72–62	3–0 (1–0)	WVU Coliseum; Morgantown, West Virginia
Dec 6, 1977		at Rutgers	W 61–54	4–0 (2–0)	Rutgers Athletic Center; Piscataway, New Jersey
Dec 10, 1977*		vs. Penn	W 69–68	5–0	The Palestra; Philadelphia, Pennsylvania
Dec 13, 1977*		at Princeton	W 58–56	6–0	Jadwin Gymnasium; Princeton, New Jersey
Dec 22, 1977		Duquesne	W 86–70	7–0 (3–0)	Villanova Field House; Villanova, Pennsylvania
Dec 28, 1977*		vs. Washington; Far West Classic	W 78–73	8–0	Veterans Memorial Coliseum; Portland, Oregon
Dec 29, 1977*		at Oregon State; Far West Classic	L 57–58 ^{OT}	8–1	Veterans Memorial Coliseum; Portland, Oregon
Dec 30, 1977*		vs. Washington State; Far West Classic	L 56–62	8–2	Veterans Memorial Coliseum; Portland, Oregon
Jan 7, 1978*		Boston College	W 102–76	9–2	The Palestra; Philadelphia, Pennsylvania
Jan 11, 1978		UMass	W 71–64	10–2 (4–0)	The Palestra; Philadelphia, Pennsylvania
Jan 14, 1978*		vs. Temple	L 73–81	10–3	The Palestra; Philadelphia, Pennsylvania
Jan 17, 1978*		Rider	W 76–60	11–3	The Palestra; Philadelphia, Pennsylvania
Jan 19, 1978*		at No. 7 Notre Dame	L 69–70	11–4	Joyce Center; Notre Dame, Indiana
Jan 21, 1978		George Washington	W 90–83	12–4 (5–0)	Villanova Field House; Villanova, Pennsylvania
Jan 25, 1978		Penn State	W 98–76	13–4 (6–0)	Villanova Field House; Villanova, Pennsylvania
Jan 28, 1978*		at St. John's	L 64–65	13–5	Alumni Hall; Queens, New York
Jan 31, 1978*		at No. 16 Providence	W 73–66	14–5	Providence Civic Center (10,229); Providence, Rhode Island
Feb 4, 1978		at George Washington	W 59–58	15–5 (7–0)	Charles E. Smith Center; Washington, D.C.
Feb 8, 1978*		St. Bonaventure	W 91–76	16–5	The Palestra; Philadelphia, Pennsylvania
Feb 11, 1978		at Pittsburgh	L 81–97	16–6 (7–1)	Fitzgerald Field House; Pittsburgh, Pennsylvania
Feb 14, 1978		at UMass	L 72–87	16–7 (7–2)	Curry Hicks Cage; Amherst, Massachusetts
Feb 18, 1978*		at La Salle	W 82–79	17–7	The Palestra; Philadelphia, Pennsylvania
Feb 22, 1978		Rutgers	L 78–81 ^{OT}	17–8 (7–3)	Villanova Field House; Villanova, Pennsylvania
Feb 25, 1978*		vs. Saint Joseph's	W 72–64	18–8	The Palestra; Philadelphia, Pennsylvania
EAA tournament
Mar 2, 1978*	(2)	vs. (7) Penn State; Quarterfinals	W 73–65	19–8	Civic Arena; Pittsburgh, Pennsylvania
Mar 3, 1978*	(2)	at (3) Pittsburgh; Semifinals	W 72–70	20–8	Civic Arena; Pittsburgh, Pennsylvania
Mar 4, 1978*	(2)	vs. (8) West Virginia; Championship game	W 63–59	21–8	Civic Arena; Pittsburgh, Pennsylvania
NCAA tournament
Mar 12, 1978*	(E 2Q)	vs. (E 4L) La Salle; First round	W 103–97	22–8	The Palestra; Philadelphia, Pennsylvania
Mar 17, 1978*	(E 2Q)	vs. (E 1L) No. 13 Indiana; East Regional Semifinal – Sweet Sixteen	W 61–60	23–8	Providence Civic Center; Providence, Rhode Island
Mar 19, 1978*	(E 2Q)	vs. (E 1Q) No. 7 Duke; East Regional Final – Elite Eight	L 72–90	23–9	Providence Civic Center; Providence, Rhode Island
*Non-conference game. ^{#}Rankings from AP poll. (#) Tournament seedings in parentheses. E=East. All times are in Eastern Time.
