= Justin Herron =

American football player (born 1995)

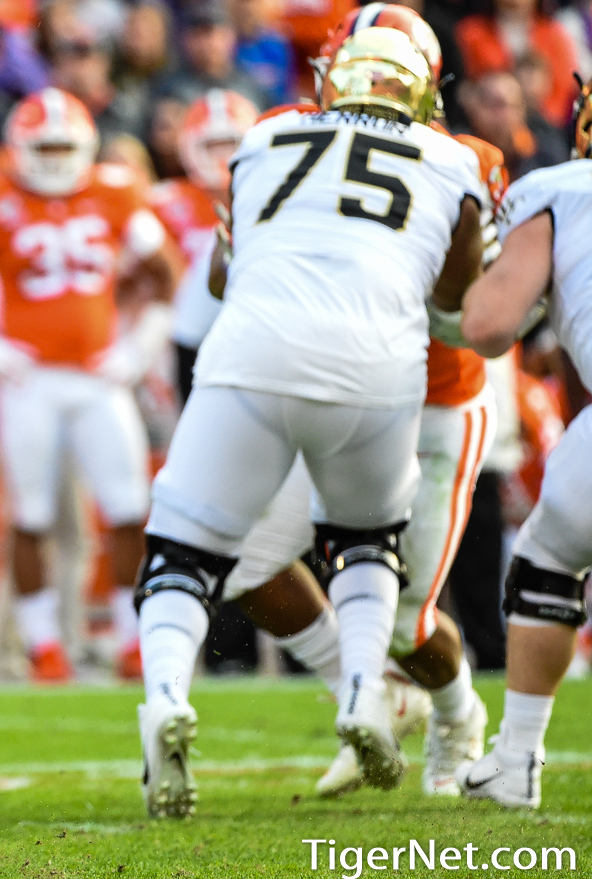
- Herron with the Wake Forest Demon Deacons

Profile
- Position: Offensive tackle

Personal information
- Born: November 27, 1995 (age 30); Silver Spring, Maryland, U.S.
- Listed height: 6 ft 5 in (1.96 m)
- Listed weight: 305 lb (138 kg)

Career information
- High school: Bullis School (Potomac, Maryland)
- College: Wake Forest (2014–2019)
- NFL draft: 2020: 6th round, 195th overall pick

Career history
- New England Patriots (2020–2022); Las Vegas Raiders (2022–2023); New Orleans Saints (2024); Detroit Lions (2025)

Awards and highlights
- Third-team All-ACC (2019)

Career NFL statistics as of 2024
- Games played: 35
- Games started: 11
- Stats at Pro Football Reference

Justin Herron (born November 27, 1995) is an American professional football offensive tackle. He played college football for the Wake Forest Demon Deacons. He was selected by the New England Patriots in the sixth round of the 2020 NFL draft, and has also played for the Las Vegas Raiders.

== Early life ==
Herron attended Bullis School in Potomac, Maryland, where he played as an offensive lineman. In addition to football, he played baseball and basketball and was a trumpeter in the jazz band. A 3-star recruit, Herron committed to Wake Forest over offers from Boston College, Old Dominion, Rutgers, and Villanova.

== College career ==
Herron tore his ACL in Week 1 of the 2018 season. After coming back for another year as a graduate student, he was named a team captain and earned third-team All-Atlantic Coast Conference honors. He set the Wake Forest record with 51 games played.

== Professional career ==
Pre-draft measurables
Height	Weight	Arm length	Hand span	Wingspan	40-yard dash	10-yard split	20-yard split	20-yard shuttle	Three-cone drill	Vertical jump	Broad jump	Bench press
6 ft 3 5/8 in (1.92 m)	308 lb (140 kg)	33 1/2 in (0.85 m)	8 7/8 in (0.23 m)	6 ft 8 1/2 in (2.04 m)	5.26 s	1.88 s	3.09 s	4.88 s	8.41 s	33.0 in (0.84 m)	8 ft 9 in (2.67 m)	27 reps
All values from NFL Combine

=== New England Patriots ===
Herron was selected by the New England Patriots in the sixth round, with the 195th overall pick of the 2020 NFL draft. He was placed on injured reserve on October 31, 2020 with an ankle injury. He was activated on November 28.

=== Las Vegas Raiders ===
On September 21, 2022, the Patriots traded Herron and a 2024 seventh-round draft pick to the Las Vegas Raiders in exchange for a 2024 sixth-round pick. He suffered a torn ACL in practice and was placed on injured reserve on October 7.

After having played in 7 regular season games across two seasons with the team, between suffering a knee injury and a concussion, Herron was waived on December 27, 2023.

=== New Orleans Saints ===
On April 29, 2024, Herron signed with the New Orleans Saints. He was placed on injured reserve on July 28, ending his season.

=== Detroit Lions ===
On August 2, 2025, Herron signed with the Detroit Lions. He was placed on injured reserve eight days later. He was released on November 4.

== Personal life ==
His father Reggie played basketball at Villanova. His uncle Keith was a second-round selection in the 1978 NBA draft by the Portland Trail Blazers and played five seasons in the NBA.

On March 22, 2021, Herron and another citizen were given "Outstanding Service" awards by the Tempe, Arizona, Police Department for helping save a woman from a violent sexual assault.
