= John Nevin =

John Nevin may refer to:

- John Williamson Nevin, American theologian and educationalist
- John Anthony Nevin, American psychologist
- John Joe Nevin, Irish boxer
- Jake Nevin, athletic trainer for Villanova University athletic teams
