= 1978 Eastern 8 men's basketball tournament =

- Classification: Division I
- Season: 1977–78
- Teams: 8
- Site: Civic Arena; Pittsburgh
- Champions: Villanova (1st title)
- Winning coach: Rollie Massimino (1st title)
- MVP: Alex Bradley (Villanova)

1977–78 Eastern 8 men's basketball standings
| | Conf. | | | | Overall |
| Team | W | | L | PCT | W | | L | PCT |
|---|---|---|---|---|---|---|---|---|
East
| Rutgers | 7 | – | 3 | .700 | 24 | – | 7 | .774 |
| Villanova † | 7 | – | 3 | .700 | 23 | – | 9 | .719 |
| Pittsburgh | 5 | – | 5 | .500 | 16 | – | 11 | .593 |
| UMass | 5 | – | 5 | .500 | 15 | – | 12 | .556 |
West
| Duquesne | 5 | – | 5 | .500 | 11 | – | 17 | .393 |
| George Washington | 4 | – | 6 | .400 | 15 | – | 11 | .577 |
| Penn State | 4 | – | 6 | .400 | 8 | – | 19 | .296 |
| West Virginia | 3 | – | 7 | .300 | 12 | – | 16 | .429 |
† 1978 Eastern 8 Tournament winner Rankings from AP Poll

The 1978 Eastern 8 men's basketball tournament was the second season of the American men's basketball postseason competition now known as the Atlantic 10 men's basketball tournament. It was organized by the Eastern Athletic Association, popularly known as the "Eastern 8", an NCAA Division I basketball-only conference that began competition in the 1976–77 season. The conference adopted its current name of Atlantic 10 Conference in 1982.

The 1978 tournament winner was the Villanova Wildcats team.

== Bracket ==
First round March 2, 1978; Pittsburgh
1 | Rutgers | 74
8 | West Virginia | 81
4 | Massachusetts | 69
5 | Duquesne | 76*
2 | Villanova | 73
7 | Pennsylvania State | 65
3 | Pittsburgh | 85
6 | George Washington | 83

Semifinals; March 3, 1978; Pittsburgh
8 | West Virginia | 59
5 | Duquesne | 57
2 | Villanova | 72
3 | Pittsburgh | 70

Finals; March 4, 1978; Pittsburgh
8 | West Virginia | 59
2 | Villanova | 63
