= Ingelsby =

Ingelsby is a surname. It may refer to:

- Brad Ingelsby (born 1980), American screenwriter and film producer
- Martin Ingelsby (born 1978), American college basketball coach, brother of Brad Ingelsby
- Tom Ingelsby (born 1951), American basketball player during 1970s, father of Brad and Martin Ingelsby
