= Hubie White =

American basketball player (born 1940)

Personal information
- Born: January 26, 1940 (age 86) Philadelphia, Pennsylvania, U.S.
- Listed height: 6 ft 4 in (1.93 m)
- Listed weight: 205 lb (93 kg)

Career information
- High school: West Philadelphia (Philadelphia, Pennsylvania)
- College: Villanova (1959–1962)
- NBA draft: 1962: 2nd round, 14th overall pick
- Drafted by: San Francisco Warriors
- Playing career: 1962–1971
- Position: Shooting guard
- Number: 7, 23, 32, 14

Career history
- 1962–1963: San Francisco Warriors
- 1963: Camden Bullets
- 1963–1964: Wilmington Blue Bombers
- 1964: Philadelphia 76ers
- 1964–1965: Wilkes-Barre Barons
- 1965–1967: Harrisburg Patriots
- 1967–1968: Wilkes-Barre Barons
- 1969–1970: Miami Floridians
- 1970–1971: Pittsburgh Condors
- 1971: Trenton Pat Pavers

Career highlights
- Second-team All-American – SN (1962); Robert V. Geasey Trophy winner (1962); No. 14 retired by Villanova Wildcats

Career NBA and ABA statistics
- Points: 578 (4.8 ppg)
- Rebounds: 264 (2.2 rpg)
- Assists: 110 (0.9 apg)
- Stats at NBA.com
- Stats at Basketball Reference

Hubie White (born January 26, 1940) is an American former basketball player. The 6' 3" shooting guard played for West Philadelphia High School in Philadelphia. He played college basketball for Villanova University from 1959 to 1962. White earned All-America honors in 1962. He was a three-time All Big Five player, AP and UPI All-East, and two-time All State. Villanova retired White's #14 jersey on January 27, 2001.

White played professionally for San Francisco (NBA) in the 1962–63 season, Philadelphia (NBA) 1963–64, Miami (ABA) 1969–70, and Pittsburgh (ABA) 1970–71.

== Career statistics ==
Legend
GP	Games played	GS	Games started	MPG	Minutes per game
FG%	Field goal percentage	3P%	3-point field goal percentage	FT%	Free throw percentage
RPG	Rebounds per game	APG	Assists per game	SPG	Steals per game
BPG	Blocks per game	PPG	Points per game	**Bold**	Career high

=== NBA/ABA ===
==== Regular season ====
Year	Team	GP	MPG	FG%	3P%	FT%	RPG	APG	PPG
1962–63	San Francisco	29	9.3	.360		.667	1.2	**1.0**	3.2
1963–64	Philadelphia	23	8.5	.295		.607	1.8	.5	3.4
1969–70	Miami (ABA)	**54**	**15.3**	**.402**	.163	.738	**2.9**	**1.0**	**6.7**
1970–71	Pittsburgh (ABA)	14	11.9	.279	**.286**	**.769**	2.3	**1.0**	3.3
Career (NBA)		52	9.0	.329		.630	1.5	.8	3.3
Career (ABA)		68	14.6	.384	.180	.742	2.8	1.0	6.0
Career (overall)		120	12.1	.366	.180	.706	2.2	.9	4.5
