= Bob Schafer =

American basketball player

Personal information
- Born: March 29, 1933 Philadelphia, Pennsylvania, U.S.
- Died: February 15, 2005 (aged 71) Philadelphia, Pennsylvania, U.S.
- Listed height: 6 ft 3 in (1.91 m)
- Listed weight: 195 lb (88 kg)

Career information
- High school: Roman Catholic (Philadelphia, Pennsylvania)
- College: Villanova (1952–1955)
- NBA draft: 1955: 3rd round, 17th overall pick
- Drafted by: Philadelphia Warriors
- Playing career: 1955–1956
- Position: Shooting guard
- Number: 25, 7, 27, 3

Career history
- 1955: Philadelphia Warriors
- 1955–1956: St. Louis Hawks
- 1956: Syracuse Nationals

Career highlights
- No. 25 retired by Villanova Wildcats; AP Honorable mention All-American (1954)

Career NBA statistics
- Points: 273
- Rebounds: 82
- Assists: 68
- Stats at NBA.com
- Stats at Basketball Reference

Robert Thomas Schafer (March 29, 1933 – February 15, 2005) was an American professional basketball player. The 6' 3" guard out of Roman Catholic High School in Philadelphia played college basketball for Villanova University from 1952 to 1955.

Schafer was the first Villanova player to score 2000 points, and earned All-America honors in 1954.

== Biography ==
In 1951, during his college career, Schafer was forcefully approached by three men who tried to intimidate him into throwing some games. He rejected their advances and reported the matter to the FBI.

Schafer played professional basketball for the NBA's Philadelphia Warriors and St. Louis Hawks in 1955–56, and for the Syracuse Nationals in 1956–57.

== Career statistics ==
Legend
GP	Games played	GS	Games started	MPG	Minutes per game
FG%	Field goal percentage	3P%	3-point field goal percentage	FT%	Free throw percentage
RPG	Rebounds per game	APG	Assists per game	SPG	Steals per game
BPG	Blocks per game	PPG	Points per game	**Bold**	Career high

=== NBA ===
==== Regular season ====
Year	Team	GP	MPG	FG%	FT%	RPG	APG	PPG
1955–56	Philadelphia	12	6.8	**.343**	.583	1.1	.8	2.6
1955–56	St. Louis	**42**	11.8	.294	.797	**1.4**	1.0	**4.6**
1956–57	Syracuse	11	**15.2**	.288	**.846**	1.0	**1.4**	4.5
Career		65	11.5	.298	.777	1.3	1.0	4.2

==== Playoffs ====
Year	Team	GP	MPG	FG%	FT%	RPG	APG	PPG
1956	St. Louis	4	9.8	.150	.833	2.3	.3	2.8
