= Joe Lord =

American basketball player

Personal information
- Born: December 28, 1922 Norristown, Pennsylvania
- Died: December 1986 (aged 63–64) Absecon, New Jersey
- Listed height: 6 ft 1 in (1.85 m)
- Listed weight: 175 lb (79 kg)

Career information
- High school: Norristown (Norristown, Pennsylvania)
- College: Villanova (1941–1943, 1945–1947)
- NBA draft: 1947: undrafted
- Playing career: 1947–1951
- Position: Guard

Career history
- 1947: Rochester Royals
- 1947–1951: Reading Keys / Rangers
- 1950–1951: Pottsville Packers
- 1951–1952: Lancaster Rockets

Career highlights
- EPBL champion (1948); All-EPBL First Team (1949); Third-team All-American – Helms (1947)

Joseph Thomas Lord Jr. (December 28, 1922 – December 1986) was an American professional basketball player. He played for the Rochester Royals for four games in the National Basketball League during the 1947–48 season and averaged 1.5 points per game. He also played in the Eastern Professional Basketball League (EPBL), where he was selected as a member of the All-EPBL First Team in 1949. Lord won an EPBL championship with the Reading Keys in 1948.
