= JayVaughn Pinkston =

American basketball player (born 1991)

Personal information
- Born: November 27, 1991 (age 34) Brooklyn, New York, U.S.
- Listed height: 6 ft 7 in (2.01 m)
- Listed weight: 240 lb (109 kg)

Career information
- High school: Bishop Loughlin (Brooklyn, New York)
- College: Villanova (2011–2015)
- NBA draft: 2015: undrafted
- Playing career: 2016–present
- Position: Power forward

Career history
- 2016–2017: Mantovana
- 2017–2018: Krosno
- 2018–2019: Kolossos Rodou
- 2019–2020: KTP Basket
- 2020: Soles de Mexicali

Career highlights
- Second-team All-Big East (2014); Third-team All-Big East (2013); Honorable mention All-Big East (2015); McDonald's All-American (2010); Second-team Parade All-American (2010)

JayVaughn Pinkston (born November 27, 1991) is an American former professional basketball player. He played college basketball for Villanova University.

Pinkston was selected to play in the McDonald's All-American Game during a stellar career at Bishop Loughlin Memorial High School. As a senior, he was selected to the Parade All-American second team. He was named New York's Player of the Year as a senior. He became the first player in Loughlin history to earn the honor of playing in the McDonald's All-American game.

== Early life ==
Pinkston was born on November 27, 1991, in Brooklyn, New York. His mother, Kerry Pinkston, gave birth to him when she was in high school. She worked several jobs, including security officer, to support him as a single mother. JayVaughn suffered several bouts of asthma as a child. He began playing basketball at the age of 11 after a growth spurt. Pinkston recalls being awful at first, but began to show signs of improvement after training with his cousin Tyren for several years.

== High school career ==
Pinkston attended Bishop Loughlin Memorial High School, where he played basketball under three different head coaches. On January 23, 2009, Pinkston scored 39 points in s loss to Christ the King High School. He was suspended academically midway through his junior season and considered transferring to a different school, but instead improved his grades. In his first game back from suspension on March 5, Bishop Loughlin edged St. Raymond's 77-74 behind 31 points from Pinkston.

As a senior, Pinkston averaged 25 points, 13 rebounds, five assists and two blocks to lead Bishop Loughlin to the CHSAA Class AA intersectional final. Pinkston's basketball résumé includes being named a McDonald's All-American while he was a senior. Pinkston dreamed of playing in the game since he was in the eighth grade. "I'm the first player from Loughlin to make the McDonald's game; that's big," Pinkston said. "In the end, it's not about individual stuff but getting the 'W.' You take nothing for granted; I did my talking on the court." He was selected to the Parade All-American second team and was named New York's Player of the Year as a senior. The McDonald's All-American scored 1,643 career points at Bishop Loughlin becoming the all-time scoring leader at the school.

The Daily News reported that multiple sources expected JayVaughn to sign a letter to attend the University of Tennessee over Villanova and St. John's, but sources with knowledge of Pinkston's thinking say he reconsidered his decision, discussed it with his family and decided to hold off until the late signing date. Before graduating, Pinkston made his announcement April 14, 2010, to continue his education at Villanova University. Coach Jay Wright was excited to for JayVaughn to be entering his school by saying, "JayVaughn is an incredibly talented young man who has a unique passion for the game. He has been well-coached by Edwin Gonzalez and Kimani Young. He can play multiple positions and has been a leader at Bishop Loughlin for four years. We are thrilled to welcome JayVaughn and his mom, Kerry, into the Villanova Family."

== College career ==
=== Redshirt ===
On November 7, 2010, Pinkston punched two students at the Sigma Phi Epsilon house. The Upper Merion Township police arrested and charged Pinkston with two counts of assault and harassment. Villanova University allowed him to finish his coursework for the first semester, but he was banned for the second semester. He could not use practice facilities and had to watch his team play from the bleachers. "That's the first time anything like that had happened to me," he said. "And that's a big one for an 18-year-old kid. I saw my life, everything I had worked for, flash before my eyes."

Jay Wright thought Pinkston was going to transfer, and offered his support if he decided to. Pinkston instead decided to stay with the team, which greatly surprised Wright. Pinkston found lodging with Matt and Christy O'Reilly, whose children went to school with Wright's children. Per NCAA policy, Pinkston had to pay the going rate for renting an apartment in the area. He found work stacking boxes in a nearby warehouse, and the O'Reillys became like a second family to him.

=== Freshman ===
Pinkston made his collegiate debut with nine points and four rebounds in a blowout win against Monmouth. He averaged 9.6 points and 5.2 rebounds per game in his redshirt freshman season. He scored 12.6 points in Big East conference games and shot 103 free throws in conference, which was a team high. Pinkston was named Big East Rookie of the Week on January 23, 2012, after posting 13 points and 12 rebounds against St. John's. In February he scored in excess of 20 points in three games, including a 28-point, 14-rebound performance versus Providence. Despite Pinkston's improvement, Villanova limped to a 13–19 record and missed the postseason.

=== Sophomore ===
Pinkston improved his nutrition and lost weight in the offseason prior to his sophomore year. As a sophomore, Pinkston led the team in scoring with 13.3 points per game. According to KenPom.com, he posted the eighth highest free-throw rate in the Division I basketball. In May, he had his assault charge expunged from his record after entering in the Accelerated Rehabilitative Disposition program.

=== Junior ===
Pinkston had a major health scare in August 2013. After turning his ankle in a pickup basketball game, his foot began to swell. Initially, he thought nothing of it, but when the swelling didn't go down, Pinkston became concerned and sought medical advice. The Villanova team physician squeezed his leg and it burst with pus. Pinkston was rushed to the hospital, where he was diagnosed with MRSA and had emergency surgery. The disease did not spread to his bloodstream and he was released in less than a week. Teammate Ryan Arcidiacono thought the major health scare changed Pinkston's outlook on life, making him a more humble person.

Pinkston was named to the preseason second team All-Big East. He notched a season-high 27 points to go along with eight rebounds in a 98–68 win at St. Joseph's on December 7. Pinkston scored his 1,000th point in a Villanova uniform on January 8, 2014, in a victory over Seton Hall; he finished with 17 points.

As a junior, Pinkston improved his averages to 14.1 points and 6.1 rebounds per game. At the conclusion of the regular season, he was a second team All-Big East selection. He joined teammate James Bell on the All-Big 5 Second Team. He was selected to the District II (NY, NJ, DE, DC, PA, WV) All-District team by the United States Basketball Writers Association (USBWA). Pinkston was listed on the National Association of Basketball Coaches Division I All‐District 5 second team on March 12.

=== Senior ===
The New York Post named Pinkston the preseason Big East Player of the Year as a senior. He was selected to the preseason first team All-Big East. In its preseason rankings of the best players in college basketball, ESPN listed Pinkston at number 39. He debuted as a senior on November 14, with 11 points and 7 rebounds against Lehigh. In Villanova's November 25 matchup against Michigan, Pinkston hit a layup to give the Wildcats a 56–55 lead with 13.4 seconds remaining and then blocked Zak Irvin's dunk attempt seconds later. Villanova ended up winning by a score of 60–55. On December 20, in the Wildcats' 82–78 overtime win over Syracuse, Pinkston had 25 points and 10 rebounds and made a basket with 4.2 seconds remaining in regulation to send the game to overtime.

== Professional career ==
=== 2015–16 season ===
After going undrafted in the 2015 NBA draft, Pinkston joined the Brooklyn Nets for the 2015 NBA Summer League. However, in his first practice with the Nets, he tore his left ACL. On March 25, 2016, he was acquired by the Maine Red Claws of the NBA Development League, but didn't play for them.

=== 2016–17 season ===
On July 1, 2016, Pinkston joined the Boston Celtics for the 2016 NBA Summer League. On July 30, 2016, Pinkston signed a one-year deal with the Italian team Dinamica Mantova of the Serie A2.

=== 2017–18 season ===
On July 13, 2017, Pinkston signed with the Polish team Krosno for the 2017–18 season. On March 18, 2018, Pinkston recorded a career-high 37 points, shooting 12-of-23 from the field, along with ten rebounds and four assists in a 106–117 overtime loss to AZS Koszalin. In 30 games played for Krosno, Pinkston averaged 18 points, 5.8 rebounds, 1.8 assists and 1.4 steals, shooting 42.4 percent from 3-point range.

=== 2018–19 season ===
On August 2, 2018, Pinkston signed a two-year deal with the Israeli team Hapoel Holon. However, on October 4, 2018, Pinkston parted ways with Holon before appearing in a game for them. On November 10, 2018, Pinkston signed with the Greek team Kolossos Rodou for the 2018–19 season.

=== 2019–20 season ===
On September 17, 2019, he has signed with KTP Basket of the Korisliiga. Pinkston averaged 16.4 points, 5.9 rebounds, 2.5 assists and 1.4 steals per game.

=== 2020–21 season ===
On August 22, 2020, Pinkston signed with Soles de Mexicali of the Liga Nacional de Baloncesto Profesional. In the first game of the season, Pinkston suffered a calf injury and left the team.

== The Basketball Tournament (TBT) ==
In the summer of 2017, Pinkston competed in The Basketball Tournament on ESPN for Supernova; a team composed of Villanova University basketball alum. In two games, he averaged 7.0 points and 2.5 rebounds per game to help number two seeded Supernova advance to the second-round where they were defeated 82–74 by Team Fancy.

== Player profile ==
At 6'7 and 235 pounds, Pinkston is somewhat undersized for the power forward position. He makes up for it with what Jay Wright calls "the killer instinct". His signature move is a fast spin move in the low post, which ESPN praised for its compactness. Pinkston worked on his footwork while he was boxing with the Police Athletic League of New York City. "No doubt boxing has improved my footwork," he said. Jon Rothstein of CBS Sports called Pinkston "a bruising forward with point guard skills" and compared him to former Villanova forward Curtis Sumpter. The Philadelphia Daily News described his game as "Charles Barkley meets DeJuan Blair."
