= 1977–78 Penn State Nittany Lions basketball team =

American college basketball season

1977–78 Penn State Nittany Lions men's basketball
- Conference: Eastern Athletic Association (Eastern 8)
- Record: 8–19 (4–6 Eastern 8)
- Head coach: Johnny Bach (10th season)
- Home arena: Rec Hall

1977–78 Eastern 8 men's basketball standings
	Conf.				Overall
Team	W		L	PCT	W		L	PCT
East
Rutgers	7	–	3	.700	24	–	7	.774
Villanova †	7	–	3	.700	23	–	9	.719
Pittsburgh	5	–	5	.500	16	–	11	.593
UMass	5	–	5	.500	15	–	12	.556
West
Duquesne	5	–	5	.500	11	–	17	.393
George Washington	4	–	6	.400	15	–	11	.577
Penn State	4	–	6	.400	8	–	19	.296
West Virginia	3	–	7	.300	12	–	16	.429
† 1978 Eastern 8 Tournament winner Rankings from AP Poll

The 1977–78 Penn State Nittany Lions men's basketball team represented the Pennsylvania State University during the 1977–78 NCAA Division I men's basketball season. The team was led by 10th-year head coach Johnny Bach, and played their home games at Rec Hall in University Park, Pennsylvania as members of the Eastern Athletic Association (Eastern 8).

== Roster ==
1977–78 Penn State Nittany Lions men's basketball team
Players	Coaches
Pos. / # / Name / Height / Weight / Year / Hometown; F / 43 / Frank Brickowski / 6 ft 9 in (2.06 m) / 232 lb (105 kg) / Fr / Bayville, New York	Head coach: Johnny Bach; Assistant coach(es) Legend: (C) Team captain; (S) Suspended; (I) Ineligible; (W) Walk-on; Injured; Current redshirt

== Schedule ==
Date time, TV	Rank^{#}	Opponent^{#}	Result	Record	Site city, state
December 1*		vs. No. 14 Maryland	L 80–89	0–1	
December 5*		Delaware	W 86–84 ^{OT}	1–1	Rec Hall; University Park, Pennsylvania
December 7*		Virginia Tech	L 75–84	1–2	Rec Hall; University Park, Pennsylvania
December 10*		North Carolina State	L 60–79	1–3	Rec Hall; University Park, Pennsylvania
December 12*		Muhlenberg	W 101–78	2–3	Rec Hall; University Park, Pennsylvania
December 16*		at No. 12 Syracuse	L 45–81	2–4	Manley Field House; Syracuse, NY
December 17*		at Colgate	W 85–63	3–4	Cotterell Court; Hamilton, NY
December 20		at Duquesne	L 55–63	3–5 (0–1)	Civic Arena; Pittsburgh, Pennsylvania
December 28		vs. DePaul	L 67–82	3–6 (0–1)	Blue Cross Arena; Rochester, New York
December 29		vs. Rochester (NY)	W 92–67	4–6 (0–1)	Blue Cross Arena; Rochester, New York
January 4		Rutgers	W 81–79	5–6 (1–1)	Rec Hall; University Park, Pennsylvania
January 7		Duquesne	L 48–54	5–7 (1–2)	Rec Hall; University Park, Pennsylvania
January 11*		No. 8 Syracuse	L 77–83	5–8 (1–2)	Rec Hall; University Park, Pennsylvania
January 14		at George Washington	L 68–84	5–9 (1–3)	Charles E. Smith Center; Washington, D.C.
January 16*		at No. 13 Virginia	L 56–83	5–10 (1–3)	University Hall; Charlottesville, Virginia
January 22*		at Saint Francis (PA)	L 68–72	5–11 (1–3)	Maurice Stokes Athletic Center
January 25		at Villanova	L 76–98	5–12 (1–4)	Villanova Field House; Villanova, Pennsylvania
January 28		Pittsburgh	L 65–82	5–13 (1–5)	Rec Hall; University Park, Pennsylvania
January 30		at West Virginia	L 68–78	5–14 (1–6)	WVU Coliseum; Morgantown, WV
February 2*		Marquette	L 60–73	5–15 (1–6)	Rec Hall; University Park, Pennsylvania
February 4*		at Army	L 52–64	5–16 (1–6)	USMA Fieldhouse; West Point, NY
February 8*		Temple	L 64–74	5–17 (1–6)	Rec Hall; University Park, Pennsylvania
February 11*		at Navy	L 64–87	5–18 (1–6)	Halsey Field House; Annapolis, Maryland
February 15		West Virginia	W 76–75	6–18 (2–6)	Rec Hall; University Park, Pennsylvania
February 18		at Pittsburgh	W 75–68 ^{OT}	7–18 (3–6)	Fitzgerald Field House; Pittsburgh, Pennsylvania
February 21		UMass	W 76–69 ^{OT}	8–18 (4–6)	Rec Hall; University Park, Pennsylvania
EAAC tournament
March 2	(7)	vs. (2) Villanova; Quarterfinals	L 65–73	8–19 (4–6)	Civic Arena; Pittsburgh, Pennsylvania
*Non-conference game. ^{#}Rankings from AP poll. (#) Tournament seedings in parentheses. All times are in Eastern Time.
