= Jake Nevin =

John "Jake" Nevin (ca. 1910 - December 10, 1985) served as an athletic trainer for Villanova University athletic teams for over 50 years until his death in 1985. Nevin, then using a wheelchair and suffering from Lou Gehrig's disease, inspired the 1985 Villanova Wildcats basketball team during their run to the NCAA Championship. In 1985, Villanova renamed the Villanova Field House in honor of Nevin. Villanova also retired basketball jersey number 1 for Nevin.
