= Keith Herron =

American basketball player (born 1956)

Personal information
- Born: June 14, 1956 (age 70) Memphis, Tennessee, U.S.
- Listed height: 6 ft 6 in (1.98 m)
- Listed weight: 195 lb (88 kg)

Career information
- High school: Mackin Catholic (Washington, D.C.)
- College: Villanova (1974–1978)
- NBA draft: 1978: 2nd round, 24th overall pick
- Drafted by: Portland Trail Blazers
- Playing career: 1978–1982
- Position: Shooting guard / small forward
- Number: 33, 15

Career history
- 1978–1979: Atlanta Hawks
- 1980–1981: Detroit Pistons
- 1981–1982: Cleveland Cavaliers

Career NBA statistics
- Points: 1,219 (9.8 ppg)
- Rebounds: 242 (2.0 rpg)
- Assists: 174 (1.4 apg)
- Stats at NBA.com
- Stats at Basketball Reference

Keith Orlando Herron (born June 14, 1956) is an American former professional basketball player. He was born in Memphis, Tennessee.

As a 6'7" forward out of Mackin High School in Washington, D.C., he played collegiately for the Villanova Wildcats. At the end of his college basketball career, he was Villanova's all-time leading scorer for 19 years, a mark that has since been surpassed by Kerry Kittles. Herron was named to Basketball Weekly's All-East team, The Sporting News All-America team, the All-NIT team, and twice to the All-Big Five team. Herron's brothers Larry and Reggie also played for the Villanova Wildcats.

Herron was drafted by the Portland Trail Blazers in the second round of the 1978 NBA draft. Herron played for the Atlanta Hawks in 1978–79, Detroit Pistons in 1980–81, and Cleveland Cavaliers in 1981–82.

Herron's nephew Justin Herron is an offensive tackle for the New England Patriots.

== Career statistics ==
Legend
GP	Games played	GS	Games started	MPG	Minutes per game
FG%	Field goal percentage	3P%	3-point field goal percentage	FT%	Free throw percentage
RPG	Rebounds per game	APG	Assists per game	SPG	Steals per game
BPG	Blocks per game	PPG	Points per game	**Bold**	Career high

=== NBA ===
==== Regular season ====
Year	Team	GP	GS	MPG	FG%	3P%	FT%	RPG	APG	SPG	BPG	PPG
1978–79	Atlanta	14	0	5.8	.292		**.923**	.7	.2	.4	.1	2.9
1980–81	Detroit	**80**		**28.4**	**.453**	**.182**	.854	**2.6**	**1.9**	**1.1**	**.3**	**13.7**
1981–82	Cleveland	30	0	9.0	.368	.000	.875	.7	.8	.3	.1	2.8
Career		124	0	21.1	.438	.167	.858	2.0	1.4	.8	.2	9.8
