= Tom Ingelsby =

American basketball player (born 1951)

Personal information
- Born: February 12, 1951 (age 75) Philadelphia, Pennsylvania, U.S.
- Listed height: 6 ft 3 in (1.91 m)
- Listed weight: 180 lb (82 kg)

Career information
- High school: Cardinal O'Hara (Springfield, Pennsylvania)
- College: Villanova (1970–1973)
- NBA draft: 1973: 2nd round, 27th overall pick
- Drafted by: Atlanta Hawks
- Playing career: 1973–1976
- Position: Point guard
- Number: 24, 42, 6

Career history
- 1973–1974: Atlanta Hawks
- 1974–1975: Spirits of St. Louis
- 1975: San Diego Sails
- 1975–1976: Lancaster Red Roses

Career highlights
- No. 24 retired by Villanova Wildcats; Robert V. Geasey Trophy winner (1973)
- Stats at NBA.com
- Stats at Basketball Reference

Thomas J. Ingelsby (born February 12, 1951) is an American former professional basketball player.

Ingelsby spent his youth in Springfield, Delaware County, Pennsylvania. He attended St. Francis of Assisi Elementary School in Springfield, where he played basketball and football. As the quarterback, he led the football team to victory in the Philadelphia Parade of Champions. Ingelsby continued his athletic career at Cardinal O'Hara High School in Springfield from 1965 to 1969. In his junior season, he played a pivotal role in helping the basketball team win the Philadelphia Catholic League championship, although they fell short in the City Championship to the West Philadelphia High School Speedboys.

Standing at 6' 3" tall, Ingelsby played college basketball for the Villanova Wildcats from 1970 to 1973. He earned recognition as the MVP of the Quaker City Tournament in Philadelphia in 1972 and was also named to the NABC and Big Five All-Star squad that season. Throughout his collegiate career, Ingelsby accumulated 1616 points and 279 assists.

Ingelsby was selected in the late first round of the 1972 NBA draft as the 27th overall pick by the Atlanta Hawks. He went on to play professionally for the Atlanta Hawks during the 1973–74 season, the Spirits of St. Louis (American Basketball Association) in the 1974–75 season, and the San Diego Sails in the 1975–76 season.

Ingelsby is the father of Delaware coach Martin Ingelsby and coached his son at Archbishop Carroll High School. His son Brad Ingelsby is a screenwriter, and his daughter Chrissi Ingelsby Dunleavy is married to Baker Dunleavy. Ingelsby and his wife Rose have two other children, Colleen Ingelsby Mooney and Tom Ingelsby, co-founder of Wayne, PA based Birch Benefits.

== Career statistics ==
Legend
GP	Games played	GS	Games started	MPG	Minutes per game
FG%	Field goal percentage	3P%	3-point field goal percentage	FT%	Free throw percentage
RPG	Rebounds per game	APG	Assists per game	SPG	Steals per game
BPG	Blocks per game	PPG	Points per game	**Bold**	Career high

=== NBA/ABA ===
==== Regular season ====
Year	Team	GP	MPG	FG%	3P%	FT%	RPG	APG	SPG	BPG	PPG
1973–74	Atlanta (NBA)	**48**	8.3	.382		.784	.9	.8	.4	**.1**	2.7
1974–75	St. Louis (ABA)	22	**15.6**	**.489**	**.200**	.741	**2.3**	**1.7**	**.6**	.0	**5.0**
1975–76	San Diego (ABA)	5	2.8	.333	–	**1.000**	.6	.0	.0	.0	.8
Career (ABA)		27	13.3	.484	.200	.759	2.0	1.4	.5	.0	4.2
Career (overall)		75	10.1	.424	.200	.773	1.3	1.0	.4	.1	3.2
