= Villanova Wildcats men's basketball =

Basketball team for Villanova University, Pennsylvania, US

2026–27 Villanova Wildcats men's basketball team
- University: Villanova University
- First season: 1920–21; 106 years ago
- Athletic director: Eric Roedl
- Head coach: Kevin Willard; 2nd season, 24–7 (.774)
- Location: Villanova, Pennsylvania
- Arena: William B. Finneran Pavilion (6,500); Xfinity Mobile Arena (21,600)
- NCAA division: Division I
- Conference: Big East
- Nickname: Wildcats
- Colors: Navy blue and white
- Student section: Nova Nation
- All-time record: 1849–956 (.659)
- NCAA tournament record: 71–39 (.645)

NCAA Division I tournament champions
- 1985, 2016, 2018
Other NCAA Division I tournament results
Runner-up	1971*
Final Four	1939, 1971*, 1985, 2009, 2016, 2018, 2022
Elite Eight	1939, 1949, 1962, 1970, 1971*, 1978, 1982, 1983, 1985, 1988, 2006, 2009, 2016, 2018, 2022
Sweet Sixteen	1951, 1955, 1962, 1964, 1970, 1971*, 1972, 1978, 1982, 1983, 1985, 1988, 2005, 2006, 2008, 2009, 2016, 2018, 2021, 2022
Appearances	1939, 1949, 1951, 1955, 1962, 1964, 1969, 1970, 1971*, 1972, 1978, 1980, 1981, 1982, 1983, 1984, 1985, 1986, 1988, 1990, 1991, 1995, 1996, 1997, 1999, 2005, 2006, 2007, 2008, 2009, 2010, 2011, 2013, 2014, 2015, 2016, 2017, 2018, 2019, 2021, 2022, 2026

NIT champions
- 1994

Conference tournament champions
- Eastern 8: 1978, 1980 Big East: 1995, 2015, 2017, 2018, 2019, 2022

Conference regular-season champions
- Eastern 8: 1978, 1979, 1980 Big East: 1982, 1983, 1997, 2006, 2014, 2015, 2016, 2017, 2019, 2020, 2021

Conference division champions
- Big East 6: 1997

Uniforms
Home	Away
- * vacated by NCAA

The Villanova Wildcats men's basketball program represent Villanova University in men's college basketball and competes in the Big East Conference of NCAA Division I. Their first season was the 1920–21 season. Named the Wildcats, Villanova is a member of the Philadelphia Big 5, five Philadelphia college basketball teams who share a passionate rivalry. (Note: Villanova has announced it will be withdrawing from the Big 5 after the 2026–27 season.)

The Wildcats have won the national championship three times: 1985, 2016, and 2018. Their 1985 NCAA championship victory as an 8 seed still stands as the lowest seed ever to win the title. The championship game of that year is referred to as "The Perfect Game" as they shot a championship game record 78.6% as a team for the game (22 for 28, including 9 for 10 in the second half). Their 2016 NCAA Championship is referred to as "The Perfect Ending" and became the second of only two NCAA Men's Championship games to be won on a buzzer beater when Kris Jenkins drained a shot as time expired. They made the Final Four in 1939, 1971, 1985, 2009, 2016, 2018, and 2022; their six Final Four appearances are 13th most all-time. As of 2026, they have an NCAA Tournament record of 71–39 (.637).

Villanova has defeated six No. 1 seeds in the NCAA tournament (Michigan and Georgetown in 1985, Pittsburgh in 2009, Kansas and North Carolina in 2016, and Kansas in 2018), which is sixth most all-time. The Villanova Wildcats have appeared in the NCAA tournament 39 times, the eighth highest total in NCAA history. They have won the Big East regular season championship eight times, most recently winning four straight from 2014 to 2017. They won the Big East tournament in 1995, 2015, 2017, 2018, 2019 and 2022. Through 2021, Villanova has 1,817 wins, which is 19th among Division I men's basketball teams and is tied for 9th in all time winning percentage at (.657). Villanova has won the Philadelphia Big Five 27 times, and is tied with Temple University for the most of any team, including five straight from 2014 to 2018. The Wildcats have appeared in the National Invitation Tournament 18 times, winning in 1994.

== By the numbers ==
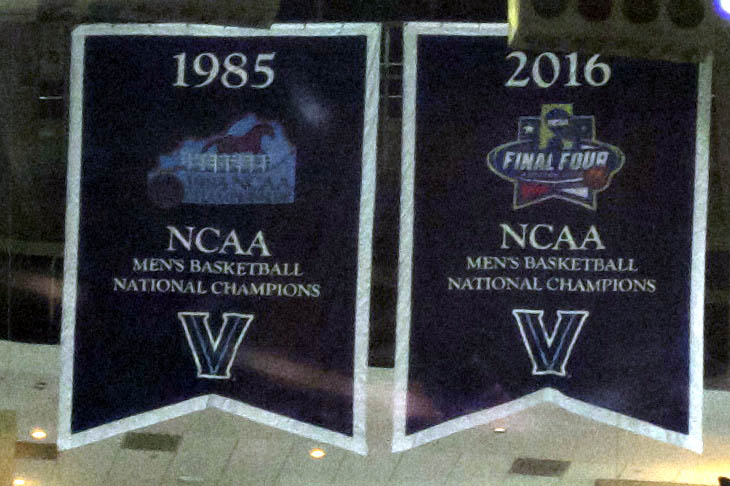
Villanova national championship banners hanging in the rafters of the Xfinity Mobile Arena in South Philadelphia, the home arena for the Wildcats

- NCAA National Championships – 3
- NCAA Championship Game Appearances – 4
- NCAA Final Four – 7
- NCAA Elite Eight – 14
- NCAA Sweet Sixteen – 18
- NCAA Tournament Appearances – 39
- National Coach of the Year – 2
- Conference Regular Season Championships – 12
- All-Americans – 20
- Weeks Ranked as AP #1 Team – 19
- 30-Win Seasons – 5
- Philadelphia Big 5 Championships – 25
- Philadelphia Big 5 Player of the Year – 20
- Winning Seasons – 78

== History ==
=== Early years (1920–1936) ===
Villanova began its varsity basketball program in 1920. Michael Saxe coached for six seasons, from 1920 to 1926, compiling a 64–30 record (.681). John Cashman coached three seasons, from 1926 to 1929, compiling a 21–26 record (.447). George "Doc" Jacobs coached seven seasons, from 1929 to 1936, and had a 62–56 record (.525).

The team played its first game in 1920 in Alumni Hall on Villanova's campus, beating Catholic University 43–40. In the early years, Villanova's home courts were Alumni Hall and West Catholic High School. In 1932, The Wildcats moved into the Villanova Field House—now known as the Jake Nevin Field House, which was named after Villanova's long-time trainer. Villanova also played many home games at the Palestra on the campus of the University of Pennsylvania beginning in 1929. The Wildcats played home games in both the Villanova Field House and the Palestra until 1986.

=== Al Severance era (1936–1961) ===
Al Severance coached Villanova for 25 seasons, from 1936 to 1961. It was under Severance's leadership that Villanova's basketball program rose to prominence. Severance compiled a 413–201 record (.673).

The 1938–39 team won the first-ever NCAA Tournament game, which put them in the inaugural Final Four. Severance led the Wildcats to the NCAA tournament again in 1949, 1951, and 1955. Villanova earned NIT bids in 1959 and 1960.

The most storied player in Villanova history, Paul Arizin, played during this era. Severance discovered Arizin, already a Villanova student, playing basketball in the Villanova Fieldhouse. Arizin holds the Villanova record for most points in a game (85), and is credited with inventing the jump shot and was the 1949 College Player of the Year. Other notable players from the Severance era include Joe Lord, Larry Hennessy, Bob Schafer and George Raveling.

Coincidentally, Severance died on April 1, 1985, which was the same day that Villanova upset Georgetown University and Patrick Ewing to take the NCAA basketball championship.

==== 1939 Final Four ====
The inaugural NCAA tournament featured eight teams from throughout the country. Villanova, representing the Mid-Atlantic states, beat Brown, representative of the New England States, 43–40 before a crowd of 3,500 at the Palestra. The following night, the Wildcats lost to Ohio State 53–36 in the Eastern Division championship.

=== Jack Kraft era (1961–1973) ===
Jack Kraft coached Villanova for 12 years, from 1961 through 1973. He compiled a 238–95 record (.715). Kraft led Villanova to the NCAA tournament six times, and five times to the NIT. Only once did Kraft's teams fail to earn a post-season bid, in his final season.

Notable players during the Jack Kraft era include: Chris Ford, Tom Ingelsby, Wali Jones, Bill Melchionni, Howard Porter, Jim Washington, and Hubie White.

==== 1971 NCAA finalist ====
On March 27, 1971, Villanova made its first appearance in an NCAA basketball tournament championship game against the legendary John Wooden and his mighty UCLA Bruins.

Kraft's Villanova squad, entering the game at 27–6, was nicknamed the "Iron Men" and made up of just nine players led by Howard Porter. Defending champion UCLA, at 28–1, featured Sidney Wicks, Curtis Rowe, Henry Bibby, and Steve Patterson. The Bruins had won six of the previous seven NCAA championships, including the previous four.

Villanova fought from behind for most of the game, twice cutting the lead to three in the final minutes. Villanova lost by six, 68–62. Up to that time, the six-point loss was the narrowest spread of UCLA's six NCAA title game victories.

Despite the loss, Villanova's Howard Porter was named the Tournament's Most Outstanding Player. Porter was later stripped of the award and the team's NCAA victories were vacated after it was discovered that Porter had violated NCAA rules because he had signed a professional contract with the Pittsburgh Condors of the American Basketball Association during the middle of his senior year.

=== Rollie Massimino era (1973–1992) ===
During Rollie Massimino's tenure, the Villanova Wildcats abandoned their traditional independent status by joining the newly formed Eastern Eight Conference in 1975. In 1980, the Wildcats moved into the new Big East Conference, along with Georgetown, St. John's, and Syracuse. The 1980s were the golden age of the Big East, highlighted by the 1985 NCAA tournament, when Villanova, Georgetown, and St. John's all reached the Final Four.

Massimino's teams had tremendous success in the NCAA tournament, usually in an underdog role. He led the Wildcats to the NCAA tournament 11 times, winning in 1985, and his teams reached the Elite Eight five times in an 11-year span: 1978, 1982, 1983, 1985, and 1988. Massimino's teams were well-prepared for the tournament, always playing a difficult schedule and emphasizing tenacious defense. Massimino lost the opening game in the NCAA tournament only once, to Shaquille O'Neal and Chris Jackson-led LSU in 1990, and he remarkably never lost to a lower-seeded team.

Massimino coached for 19 seasons at Villanova, compiling a record of 357–241 (.596). In the NCAA tournament, Massimino had a 20–10 record (.667).

Notable players from the Massimino era include Alex Bradley, Stewart Granger, Keith Herron, Dwayne McClain, Harold Jensen, Ed Pinckney, John Pinone, Harold Pressley, Rory Sparrow, and Doug West.

In 1976, the Wildcats played their first game in the Spectrum in Philadelphia. Because of the greater seating capacity, Villanova generally played a few home games each year at the Spectrum until the opening of what is now known as the Xfinity Mobile Arena. Villanova christened its current home court as John Eleuthère du Pont Pavilion, now the Pavilion, with a 64–62 victory over Maryland on February 1, 1986.

==== 1985 National Champions ====
In 1985, under the direction of Massimino, the men's basketball team completed one of the most surprising runs in NCAA tournament history by winning the national championship in the first year of the 64-team field. The eighth-seeded Wildcats (unranked in the final AP poll) beat Dayton (at Dayton), top-seeded Michigan, Maryland and second-seeded North Carolina to win the Southeast Regional en route to the Final Four in Lexington, Kentucky. After defeating 2-seed Memphis State in the national semifinals, Villanova met defending champion Georgetown, a 10-favorite led by Patrick Ewing, in the title game on April 1, 1985.

Top-seeded Georgetown had beaten conference rival Villanova twice during the regular season, and had reached the title game with tenacious defense, which gave up less than 40% of their opponents' shots from the field in both the regular season and the postseason. Before the championship game, Massimino told his team they had to play a perfect game in order to beat Georgetown. In perhaps the greatest shooting performance in NCAA history, the Wildcats went 22-of-28 from the field to convert a blistering 78.6% of their shots, including a second half where they missed only one basket. The Hoyas hung tough, converting 55% of their 53 attempts, but were unable to overcome the astounding shooting performance as Villanova won 66–64 to claim the NCAA championship. The Wildcat squad remains the only eight-seed and the lowest overall seed in tournament history to win the championship, and their overall team shooting percentage remains an NCAA tournament record for a single game. The game is often cited among the greatest upsets in college basketball history. Ed Pinckney, who shot 5-of-7 and had 16 points in the game, was named the tournament's Most Outstanding Player. This game is featured in the book The Perfect Game by Frank Fitzpatrick.

=== Steve Lappas era (1992–2001) ===
Lappas compiled a very respectable record of 174–110 (.613) during his years at Villanova. The 1994 and 1995 teams, led by Kerry Kittles, Jason Lawson, Eric Eberz, and Alvin Williams, won the NIT and Big East tournaments, respectively. The 1995 Big East tournament title was capped by a decisive victory over a Connecticut team that had been ranked Number 1 during the regular season before being defeated on the Huskies home court by Villanova. This represents the one and only time Villanova won the original Big East tournament before the Conference was reconfigured in 2013.

Under Coach Lappas, Villanova reached the NCAA tournament in 1995, 1996, 1997, and 1999, compiling a disappointing 2–4 record and never advancing beyond the second round. After a 2001 First round NIT loss at Minnesota, junior center Michael Bradley announced he was forgoing his final year of eligibility to enter the NBA draft, essentially leaving Villanova without a returning star player. Shortly thereafter, Hofstra coach and former Massimino assistant Jay Wright became available, and the Administration decided a coaching change would benefit all parties. Lappas left Villanova to pursue other opportunities, ultimately becoming a respected television analyst for CBS coverage of NCAA basketball, and has been welcomed back with open arms to the Villanova basketball family.

Notable players in the Lappas era include Michael Bradley, Kerry Kittles, Jason Lawson, Tim Thomas, John Celestand and Alvin Williams and Eric Eberz.

During the Lappas-era, Villanova began playing a few major home games at Xfinity Mobile Arena beginning in 1996. Villanova's first game in the new arena was a December 1996 loss to the Duke Blue Devils. Xfinity Mobile Arena was known as the CoreStates Center, the First Union Center, the Wachovia Center, and the Wells Fargo Center before it adopted its current name.

=== Jay Wright era (2001–2022) ===
Jay Wright was named Villanova's head coach in 2001. As Rollie Massimino's assistant from 1987 through 1992, he was well-acquainted with Villanova. Prior to his hiring by Villanova, Wright was head coach at Hofstra.

Villanova earned a post-season tournament berth in each of Wright's initial ten seasons as Villanova head coach before missing in 2011–12. The Wildcats played in the NIT in 2002, 2003, and 2004, and in 14 of 15 NCAA Tournaments since 2005. Wright's Villanova teams have reached 6 Regionals, 4 Final Fours and have won 2 National Championships. During Wright's tenure, Villanova has compiled a 34–13 record in the NCAA tournament, crowned with the 2016 and 2018 National Championships. Six of Wright's NCAA Tournament losses at Villanova have been to the eventual National Champion. One of the highlights of his tenure was an amazing run to the 2009 Final Four when Villanova beat #1 seeded Pittsburgh to win the Elite 8 on a coast-to-coast buzzer beating layup by team captain Scottie Reynolds. Villanova subsequently lost the national semifinals to eventual NCAA Champion North Carolina.

Strong starts to the 2009–10 and 2010–11 seasons were followed by struggling finishes. Villanova barely beat Robert Morris in overtime before taking losses at the hands of St Mary's (2010) and George Mason (2011) in NCAA Tournament play. Villanova had a rebuilding 2011–12 season, compiling a 13–19 record and missing a post-season bid for the only time in Wright's tenure.

A young nucleus in 2012–13 was a portent of future glory and saw the Wildcats make a return trip to the 2013 NCAA tournament where they fell to once-and-future foe North Carolina. Still, a #2 seed in 2013–14 and a #1 seed in 2014–15 preceded second round NCAA exits at the hands of Connecticut (2014) and N.C. State (2015) causing Nova Nation some well-publicized consternation. The 2016 and 2018 Championship runs put the "underachiever" tag to the sword, cementing Wright's Villanova legacy as the program's greatest mentor. The 2016 National Championship victory was accomplished on the strength of Kris Jenkin's NBA-range 3 point buzzer bomb, thwarting North Carolina. The 2018 Championship win over Michigan culminated a six-game NCAA tournament run in which no opponent finished within a dozen points of the Wildcats.

Notable players during the Jay Wright era include Randy Foye, Kyle Lowry, Dante Cunningham, Allan Ray, Mike Nardi, Will Sheridan, Curtis Sumpter, Scottie Reynolds, Corey Fisher, JayVaughn Pinkston, Darrun Hilliard, 2016 champions including Final Four most outstanding player Ryan Arcidiacono, Daniel Ochefu, Kris Jenkins and Josh Hart. Four Villanova players from the 2018 championship team were drafted by the NBA—national player of the year and Final Four most outstanding player Jalen Brunson, Mikal Bridges, Donte Divincenzo and Omari Spellman. National title holdovers Phil Booth and Eric Paschall keyed Villanova' surprising run to the 2019 Big East Regular Season and tournament championships. In the 2019 NCAA Tournament, six seed Villanova gained a measure of revenge against St. Mary's with a first-round victory followed by a loss to Purdue, a strong 3 seed, in the second round. Booth ended his Villanova career as the all-time winningest player in program history with 2 national titles and 4 Big East tournament championships (2015, 2017, 2018, and 2019).

==== 2004–05 season ====
Under coach Jay Wright, Villanova's men's basketball team reached the 2005 NCAA Tournament Sweet 16, defeating New Mexico and Florida before losing to #1 seed and eventual champion North Carolina by one point. Junior Forward Curtis Sumpter was injured in the Florida game and did not return to the court until the 2006–07 season. There is controversy surrounding a disputed traveling call against Allan Ray made in the closing seconds of the UNC game. With under a minute left and Villanova down by three, Ray drove and made a shot. There was contact with a UNC defender and a whistle. Most assumed the whistle signified a foul on Carolina, giving Ray a chance to tie the game with the resultant free-throw. Incredibly, the officials ruled that Ray committed a traveling violation prior to taking the shot, negating the basket, and rendering Kyle Lowry's buzzer beating 3 pointer a mere footnote to a painful loss. In an ironic twist of fate, Booth, late in the 2016 National Championship game (also against North Carolina), made a crucial "and one" three point opportunity denied Allan Ray 12 years earlier.

==== 2005–06 season ====
Led by senior guards Randy Foye and Allan Ray as well as sophomore guard Kyle Lowry, the Villanova men's basketball team began the 2005–2006 year ranked #4 in the major polls from USA Today and the Associated Press. Having lost only three regular season games, the Wildcats enjoyed a #1 seed in the 2006 tournament—their first. The Wildcats' wins over Monmouth, Arizona, and Boston College brought them back to the Elite Eight for the first time since 1988. Villanova's 75–62 upset loss in Minneapolis to eventual champion Florida ended the team's run toward a Regional Final. The loss to Florida was the second consecutive year that Villanova was eliminated in the NCAA tournament by the eventual national champion. The Wildcats' 28 wins during the 2006 campaign was the second most victories for any Villanova Men's Basketball team at that time. Foye, Ray and Lowry all entered the NBA following the season.

==== 2006–07 season ====
Wright's 2006–2007 team was composed mainly of freshmen and sophomores who, at times, struggled to mesh. The Wildcats improved throughout the season, due in large part to the emergence of freshman Scottie Reynolds. Villanova finished the 2006–07 season with a record of 22–11. The Wildcats earned an at-large bid to the 2007 NCAA Tournament, where they lost in the second round to the Kentucky Wildcats. Villanova's 2006–07 free throw percentage of .781 led the NCAA, and set a Villanova season record.

==== 2007–08 season ====
The 2007–08 campaign was an erratic one for the young Wildcats, a team with no seniors. After a promising 9–1 start, Villanova had a rough start to its Big East season. In mid-season, the Wildcats lost five consecutive games by double digits and lost 6 of 7 games during a 3-week span in the middle of the season, as the freshmen struggled to adjust to the college game, and the experienced players encountered difficulties in adjusting to leadership positions. In February and March, as the players became more comfortable within Coach Wright's system, and with improved defense, the team began to win.

A win against Syracuse in the Big East tournament was good enough for the Wildcats to secure one of the final at-large bids to the NCAA tournament. Villanova proved it was worthy of the bid when an upset over Clemson and a victory over Siena put them in the final 16 teams in the tournament, where they lost to eventual National Champion Kansas.

==== 2008–09 season ====
Most notable in the 2008–09 season was the rise to prominence of senior forward Dante Cunningham. Cunningham averaged 16.1 points per game, an increase of nearly 6 points over the previous season. He also managed to average 7.5 rebounds, 1.2 blocks, and 1.2 steals per game. Cunningham was honored as the Big East Most Improved Player. His teammate, tenacious sophomore guard Corey Fisher, was also honored as the Big East Sixth Man of the Year for his contributions off the bench.

The Wildcats finished the regular season with a mark of 26–7, earning a school record for most regular season victories. They lost their final regular season game to the Louisville Cardinals, 69–55, in the fourth round, or semi-finals of the Big East tournament. The Wildcats began the NCAA tournament at the Wachovia Center, a secondary venue for home games. They survived an early scare by American to handily beat two of college basketball's most prestigious programs, UCLA and Duke, in the rounds of 32 and 16 by a combined margin of 43 points.

Villanova won a very close match up against number 1 seed Pittsburgh in the Elite 8 round of the tournament, with guard Scottie Reynolds racing down the court to make a layup with only 0.5 seconds left. Pitt took the final shot, which bounced off the backboard to end the game. The last-second basket by Reynolds was widely hailed as one of the most exciting plays of that year's tournament, with Sports Illustrated's Seth Davis calling the victory "one of the great games in NCAA tournament history". Villanova advanced to the Final Four where they faced the North Carolina Tar Heels. Villanova fell to the Tar Heels in the national semifinals at Ford Field in Detroit, Michigan, by a final score of 83–69. This was the fourth time in five years that Villanova's tournament ouster was by the eventual national champion.

The Wildcats' record of 30–8 broke a previous high for most victories in a season, a distinction previously held by the 2005–06 Wildcats squad. The senior class of 2009, composed of forwards Dante Cunningham, Shane Clark, Dwayne Anderson and Frank Tchuisi, earned the distinction of being the winningest senior class in school history.

==== 2009–10 season ====
The Wildcats enjoyed another highly successful regular season, finishing with a record of 24–7 and earning a #2 Seed in the NCAA tournament. They lost in the first round of the Big East tournament to Marquette and required overtime to defeat 15th seeded Robert Morris University in the opening round of the NCAA tournament. The Wildcats were defeated in the 2nd round by the 10th seeded St. Mary's Gaels.

Scottie Reynolds ended his career as the second-leading scorer in Villanova history with 2,222 points, 21 points short of breaking Kerry Kittles's all-time record. He finished his college career with 472 assists and 203 steals. Reynolds was named to the 2010 AP All-American 1st team, but was not selected in the NBA draft.

==== 2016 National Champions ====
The Wildcats enjoyed another highly successful regular season and held the AP #1 ranking in the nation for the first time in school history over a 3-week period. They finished the regular season with a 27–4 record losing only to teams (Oklahoma, Virginia, Providence, Xavier) that were ranked at the time of the match-up. Villanova finished Big East Conference play 16–2 for the third year in a row also garnering their 3rd straight outright Regular Season Conference Title. After losing in the Big East tournament championship Game to Seton Hall, 69–67, the Wildcats earned a 2 seed in the NCAA tournament South Region where they dispatched the #15 seeded UNC Asheville by 30 points, followed by a 19-point win over #7 seed Iowa. After defeating #3 seed Miami by 23, they moved on to the Elite Eight to face the overall #1 seed Kansas Jayhawks. The Wildcats defense shined as they won by 5 points to advance to their 5th Final Four and the first since 2009. They faced #2 seed Oklahoma Sooners, who had beaten Villanova by 23 on December 7, 2015, at Pearl Harbor, Hawaii early in the season. In the national semi-Finals, Villanova beat the Sooners by 44 points (an NCAA Final Four record) to advance to the NCAA Championship for the first time in 31 years. They faced the second-overall #1 seed North Carolina Tar Heels for the championship. On April 4, Villanova defeated UNC on a game-winning three-point shot at the buzzer by Kris Jenkins to win the NCAA Championship by a final score of 77–74, winning their second NCAA championship. UNC had recovered from a 10-point deficit in the final five minutes to tie the game on an off-balance, double-clutch three-point shot that passed through the net with 4.7 seconds left, leaving the Wildcats one last chance to clinch a victory before overtime. Kris Jenkins inbounded the ball to four-year team captain Ryan Arcidiacono, who dribbled down court, passed the ball and set a bubble screen to assist Jenkins' game-winning shot. Coach Jay Wright credits the play to the "Wildcat minute", where the team practices late-game scenarios at every practice. The game has been called one of the greatest in the history of NCAA tournament championships.

Villanova ended the 2016 season at 35–5 including the unanimous #1 ranking in the final Coaches' Poll (USA Today) while capturing their 2nd NCAA basketball championship trophy in the history of the program. In beating #3 seed Miami (AP #10), #1 seed Kansas (AP #1), #2 seed Oklahoma (AP #7) and #1 seed UNC (AP #3), Villanova became the first school in 31 years — since the 1985 Villanova Wildcats — to not only beat four top-three seeds on the way to a national title but to also beat four straight opponents ranked in the AP top 10, in addition to beating AP-ranked Iowa in the Round of 32. Villanova's run included two of the ten most offensively efficient games in the analytics era (2002–present), beating Miami and Oklahoma by scoring 1.56 and 1.51 points per possession in the Sweet Sixteen and Final Four, respectively. It has been called perhaps the most dominant tournament championship run of all time, and the most dominant of the analytics era by a wide margin, with Villanova posting an average margin of victory equal to 20.7 points per game (+124 total point margin).

==== 2018 National Champions ====
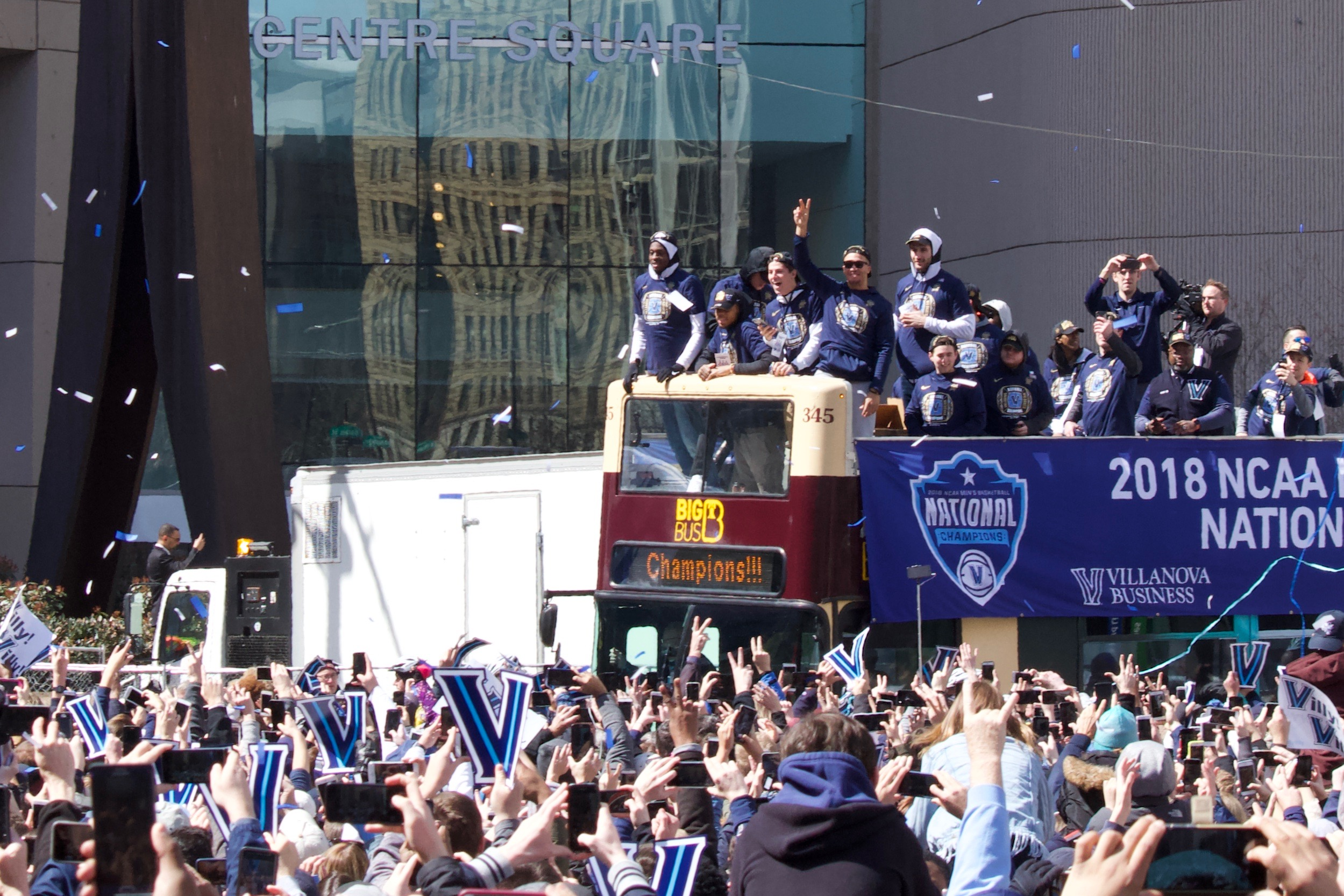
Championship parade in Center City, Philadelphia on April 5, 2018

The Wildcats finished second in regular season Big East play, won the Big East tournament, and were undefeated in non-conference play. They were awarded the top seed in the East Regional for the NCAA tournament. They reached the Final Four with wins over 16 seed Radford, 9 seed Alabama, 5 seed West Virginia and 3 seed Texas Tech with each victory coming by double-digit margins. In the national semifinals they faced the Kansas Jayhawks, the one seed from the Midwest Region, and defeated them 95–79. In this game Villanova set the new record for successful 3-point attempts in a Final Four game (breaking the previous full-game record before reaching halftime, finishing with 18 total made attempts). In the NCAA tournament championship Game they played the Michigan Wolverines, the 3 seed from the West Region. The Wildcats earned their third national championship in school history by beating the Wolverines 79–62. The game saw a historic performance by Big East Sixth Man of the Year Donte DiVincenzo (31 points, 5 rebounds, 3 assists, 2 steals and 2 blocks), named the 2018 Final Four's Most Outstanding Player. Coach Wright led the team to a 36–4 record for the 2017–18 season (14–4 Big East). The 36–4 mark sets the record for most wins in any Villanova season. Jalen Brunson received the Wooden Award as well as Associated Press and Naismith National Player of the Year Awards for his season leading the Wildcats. Mikal Bridges was presented the Julius Erving Award as the nation's best small forward—the second straight year a Villanova player achieved that honor after Josh Hart won it in 2017. Jay Wright was named winner of the John R. Wooden Legends of Coaching Award.

== Awards and honors ==
=== Individual Coaching honors ===
National Coach of the Year
2006	Jay Wright	Naismith, NABC
2016	Jay Wright	Naismith
2018	Jay Wright	Legends of Coaching Award

Conference Coach of the Year
1977	Rollie Massimino	Eastern 8 Conference
1979	Rollie Massimino	Eastern 8 Conference
1982	Rollie Massimino	Big East Conference
2006	Jay Wright	Big East Conference
2009	Jay Wright	Big East Conference
2014	Jay Wright	Big East Conference
2015	Jay Wright	Big East Conference
2016	Jay Wright	Big East Conference
2019	Jay Wright	Big East Conference

=== Individual Player honors ===
National Player of the Year
1971	Howard Porter	Forward	NCAA Final Four Most Outstanding Player
1985	Ed Pinckney	Forward	NCAA Final Four Most Outstanding Player
1997	Tim Thomas	Forward	National Freshman of the Year
1985	Ed Pinckney	Forward	NCAA Final Four Most Outstanding Player
2016	Ryan Arcidiacono	Guard	NCAA Final Four Most Outstanding Player
2017	Josh Hart	Guard	Julius Erving Award, Senior CLASS Award
2018	Jalen Brunson	Guard	Naismith, AP, John R. Wooden Award, Adolph Rupp Trophy, Bob Cousy Award
2018	Mikal Bridges	Forward	Julius Erving Award
2018	Donte DiVincenzo	Guard	NCAA Final Four Most Outstanding Player
2020	Saddiq Bey	Forward	Julius Erving Award
2022	Collin Gillespie	Guard	Bob Cousy Award

Conference Player of the Year
1995	Kerry Kittles	Guard
2006	Randy Foye	Guard
2015	Ryan Arcidiacono	Guard
2017	Josh Hart	Guard
2018	Jalen Brunson	Guard
2021	Jeremiah Robinson-Earl	Forward
2021	Collin Gillespie	Guard
2022	Collin Gillespie	Guard

Conference Individual Awards
1986	Harold Pressley	Forward	Big East Defensive Player of the Year
1988	Gary Massey	Guard	Big East Defensive Player of the Year
1997	Jason Lawson	Center	Big East Defensive Player of the Year
1997	Tim Thomas	Forward	Big East Rookie of the Year
2007	Scottie Reynolds	Guard	Big East Rookie of the Year
2009	Dante Cunningham	Guard	Big East Most Improved Player
2014	Darrun Hilliard	Guard	Big East Most Improved Player
2014	Daniel Ochefu	Center	Big East Most Improved Player
2015	Josh Hart	Guard	Big East Sixth Man of the Year
2017	Josh Hart	Guard	Big East Defensive Player of the Year
2017	Mikal Bridges	Forward	Big East Defensive Player of the Year
2018	Dante DiVincenzo	Guard	Big East Sixth Man of the Year
2018	Omari Spellman	Forward	Big East Rookie of the Year
2020	Jeremiah Robinson-Earl	Forward	Big East Rookie of the Year
2023	Cam Whitmore	Forward	Big East Rookie of the Year
2026	Tyler Perkins	Guard	Big East Most Improved Player

Big East All-Freshman team selections
1994	Jason Lawson	C
1997	Tim Thomas	F
2000	Gary Buchanan	G
2004	Mike Nardi	G
2005	Kyle Lowry	G
2007	Scottie Reynolds	G
2008	Corey Fisher	G
2010	Maalik Wayns	G
2013	Ryan Arcidiacono	G
2014	Josh Hart	G
2016	Jalen Brunson	G
2017	Donte DiVincenzo	G
2018	Omari Spellman	F
2019	Saddiq Bey	F
2020	Justin Moore	G
2020	Jeremiah Robinson-Earl	F

All-American team selections

Year	Name	Pos.
1947	Joe Lord‡	G
1950	Paul Arizin*	F
1952	Larry Hennessey‡	G
1953	Larry Hennessey‡	G
1954	Bob Schafer§	G
1969	Howard Porter‡	F
1971	Howard Porter†	F
1972	Hank Siemiontkowski§	F
1982	Stewart Granger§	G
1982	John Pinone§	F

Year	Name	Pos.
1983	John Pinone‡	F
1995	Kerry Kittles†	G
1996	Kerry Kittles*	G
1997	Alvin Williams§	G
1997	Tim Thomas§	F
2001	Michael Bradley†	C
2006	Allan Ray†	G
2006	Randy Foye*	G
2010	Scottie Reynolds*	G
2016	Josh Hart‡	G

Year	Name	Pos.
2017	Josh Hart*	G
2018	Mikal Bridges‡	F
2018	Jalen Brunson*	G
2020	Saddiq Bey§	G
2021	Collin Gillespie§	G
2021	Jeremiah Robinson-Earl§	F
2022	Collin Gillespie‡	G
2025	Eric Dixon‡	F

* – denotes consensus First-Team All-American
† – denotes consensus Second-Team All-American
‡ – denotes Third-Team AP All-American
§ – denotes AP Honorable Mention All-American

McDonald's High School All-Americans

- Ed Pinckney – 1981
- Harold Pressley – 1982
- Barry Bekkedam – 1986
- Tim Thomas – 1996
- Jason Fraser – 2002
- Scottie Reynolds – 2006
- Corey Stokes – 2007
- Dominic Cheek & Maalik Wayns – 2009
- JayVaughn Pinkston – 2010
- Jalen Brunson – 2015
- Jahvon Quinerly – 2018
- Jeremiah Robinson-Earl & Bryan Antoine – 2019

Robert V. Geasey Trophy

- Hubie White – 1962
- Wali Jones – 1963,'64
- Bill Melchionni – 1966
- Johnny Jones – 1968
- Howard Porter – 1969
- Chris Ford – 1972
- Tom Ingelsby – 1973
- John Pinone – 1981,'82,'83
- Ed Pinckney – 1985
- Harold Pressley – 1986
- Kerry Kittles – 1995,'96
- Randy Foye – 2006
- Scottie Reynolds – 2010
- James Bell – 2014
- Darrun Hilliard – 2015
- Josh Hart – 2017
- Jalen Brunson – 2018
- Saddiq Bey – 2020

== Postseason ==
=== NCAA Tournament history ===
Villanova has appeared in 40 NCAA Tournaments, beginning with the first in 1939. The Wildcats have amassed a tournament record of 67–38 (.638), and were the national champions in 1985, 2016, and 2018. Their three titles are the 8th most of any program. They have reached the Final Four five times, tied for fifteenth most. Villanova has won as the underdog (based on Tournament seeding) 16 times, more than any other program, and they are the highest seed (8) to ever win the NCAA tournament (1985). Villanova is one of only two programs (the other being Ohio State) that has played in the NCAA tournament in every decade since the 1930s.

Opponent	Result	Score	Site	City	Round
2022 − 2 Seed - FINAL FOUR
Delaware	W	80–60	PPG Paints Arena	Pittsburgh, Pennsylvania	First round
Ohio State	W	71–61	PPG Paints Arena	Pittsburgh, Pennsylvania	Second Round
Michigan	W	63–55	AT&T Center	San Antonio, Texas	Regional semifinals
Houston	W	50–44	AT&T Center	San Antonio, Texas	Regional Final
Kansas	L	65–81	Caesars Superdome	New Orleans, Louisiana	National semifinals
2021 − 5 Seed
Winthrop	W	73–63	Indiana Farmers Coliseum	Indianapolis, Indiana	First round
North Texas	W	84–61	Bankers Life Fieldhouse	Indianapolis, Indiana	Second Round
Baylor	L	51–62	Hinkle Fieldhouse	Indianapolis, Indiana	Regional semifinals
2019 − 6 Seed
Saint Mary's	W	61–57	XL Center	Hartford, Connecticut	First round
Purdue	L	61–87	XL Center	Hartford, Connecticut	Second Round
2018 − 1 Seed – NCAA CHAMPIONS
Radford	W	87–61	PPG Paints Arena	Pittsburgh, Pennsylvania	First round
Alabama	W	81–58	PPG Paints Arena	Pittsburgh, Pennsylvania	Second Round
West Virginia	W	90–78	TD Garden	Boston, Massachusetts	Regional semifinals
Texas Tech	W	71–59	TD Garden	Boston, Massachusetts	Regional Final
Kansas	W	95–79	Alamodome	San Antonio, Texas	National semifinals
Michigan	W	79–62	Alamodome	San Antonio, Texas	national championship
2017 − 1 Seed
Mount St. Mary's	W	76–56	KeyBank Center	Buffalo, New York	First round
Wisconsin	L	62–65	KeyBank Center	Buffalo, New York	Second Round
2016 – 2 Seed – NCAA CHAMPIONS
UNC Asheville	W	86–56	Barclays Center	Brooklyn, New York	First round
Iowa	W	87–68	Barclays Center	Brooklyn, New York	Second Round
Miami	W	92–69	KFC Yum! Center	Louisville, Kentucky	Regional semifinals
Kansas	W	64–59	KFC Yum! Center	Louisville, Kentucky	Regional Final
Oklahoma	W	95–51	NRG Stadium	Houston, Texas	National semifinals
North Carolina	W	77–74	NRG Stadium	Houston, Texas	national championship
2015 – 1 Seed
Lafayette	W	93–52	Consol Energy Center	Pittsburgh, Pennsylvania	Second Round
North Carolina State	L	68–71	Consol Energy Center	Pittsburgh, Pennsylvania	Third round
2014 – 2 Seed
Milwaukee	W	73–53	First Niagara Center	Buffalo, New York	Second Round
Connecticut	L	65–77	First Niagara Center	Buffalo, New York	Third round
2013 – 9 Seed
North Carolina	L	71–78	Sprint Center	Kansas City, Missouri	Second Round
2011 – 9 Seed
George Mason	L	57–61	Quicken Loans Arena	Cleveland, Ohio	Second Round
2010 – 2 Seed
Robert Morris	W	73–70 ^{OT}	Dunkin' Donuts Center	Providence, Rhode Island	First round
St. Mary's	L	68–75	Dunkin' Donuts Center	Providence, Rhode Island	Second Round
2009 – 3 Seed – FINAL FOUR
American	W	80–67	Wachovia Center	Philadelphia, Pennsylvania	First round
UCLA	W	89–69	Wachovia Center	Philadelphia, Pennsylvania	Second Round
Duke	W	77–54	TD Banknorth Garden	Boston, Massachusetts	Regional semifinals
Pittsburgh	W	78–76	TD Banknorth Garden	Boston, Massachusetts	Regional Final
North Carolina	L	69–83	Ford Field	Detroit, Michigan	National semifinals
2008 – 12 Seed – Sweet 16
Clemson	W	75–69	St. Pete Times Forum	Tampa, Florida	First round
Siena	W	84–72	St. Pete Times Forum	Tampa, Florida	Second Round
Kansas	L	57–72	Ford Field	Detroit, Michigan	Regional semifinals
2007 – 9 Seed
Kentucky	L	58–67	United Center	Chicago, Illinois	First round
2006 – 1 Seed – Elite 8
Monmouth	W	58–45	Wachovia Center	Philadelphia, Pennsylvania	First round
Arizona	W	82–78	Wachovia Center	Philadelphia, Pennsylvania	Second Round
Boston College	W	60–59 ^{OT}	Hubert H. Humphrey Metrodome	Minneapolis, Minnesota	Regional semifinals
Florida	L	62–75	Hubert H. Humphrey Metrodome	Minneapolis, Minnesota	Regional Final
2005 – 5 Seed – Sweet 16
New Mexico	W	55–47	Gaylord Entertainment Center	Nashville, Tennessee	First round
Florida	W	76–65	Gaylord Entertainment Center	Nashville, Tennessee	Second Round
North Carolina	L	67–66	Carrier Dome	Syracuse, New York	Regional semifinals
1999 – 8 Seed
Mississippi	L	70–72	Bradley Center	Milwaukee	First round
1997 – 4 Seed
Long Island	W	101–91	Lawrence Joel Veterans Memorial Coliseum	Winston-Salem, North Carolina	First round
California	L	68–75	Lawrence Joel Veterans Memorial Coliseum	Winston-Salem, North Carolina	Second Round
1996 – 3 Seed
Portland	W	92–56	Bradley Center	Milwaukee	First round
Louisville	L	64–68	Bradley Center	Milwaukee	Second Round
1995 – 3 Seed
Old Dominion	L	81–89 ^{3OT}	Pepsi Arena	Albany, New York	First round
1991 – 9 Seed
Princeton	W	50–48	Carrier Dome	Syracuse, New York	First round
North Carolina	L	69–84	Carrier Dome	Syracuse, New York	Second Round
1990 – 12 Seed
LSU	L	63–70	Thompson–Boling Arena	Knoxville, Tennessee	First round
1988 – 6 Seed – Elite 8
Arkansas	W	82–74	Riverfront Coliseum	Cincinnati	First round
Illinois	W	66–63	Riverfront Coliseum	Cincinnati	Second Round
Kentucky	W	80–74	BJCC	Birmingham, Alabama	Regional semifinals
Oklahoma	L	59–78	BJCC	Birmingham, Alabama	Regional Finals
1986 – 10 Seed
Virginia Tech	W	71–62	LSU Assembly Center	Baton Rouge, Louisiana	First round
Georgia Tech	L	61–66	LSU Assembly Center	Baton Rouge, Louisiana	Second Round
1985 – 8 Seed – NCAA CHAMPIONS
Dayton	W	51–49	University of Dayton Arena	Dayton, Ohio	First round
Michigan	W	59–55	University of Dayton Arena	Dayton, Ohio	Second Round
Maryland	W	46–43	BJCC	Birmingham, Alabama	Regional semifinals
North Carolina	W	56–44	BJCC	Birmingham, Alabama	Regional Finals
Memphis State	W	52–45	Rupp Arena	Lexington, Kentucky	National semifinals
Georgetown	W	66–64	Rupp Arena	Lexington, Kentucky	national championship
1984 – 7 Seed
Marshall	W	84–72	The MECCA	Milwaukee	First round
Illinois	L	56–64	The MECCA	Milwaukee	Second Round
1983 – 3 Seed – Elite 8
Bye					First round
Lamar	W	60–56	The Summit	Houston	Second Round
Iowa	W	55–54	Kemper Arena	Kansas City, Missouri	Regional semifinals
Houston	L	71–89	Kemper Arena	Kansas City, Missouri	Regional Finals
1982 – 3 Seed – Elite 8
Bye					First round
Northeastern	W	76–72 ^{3OT}	Nassau Coliseum	Uniondale, New York	Second Round
Memphis State	W	70–66 ^{OT}	Reynolds Coliseum	Raleigh, North Carolina	Regional semifinals
North Carolina	L	60–70	Reynolds Coliseum	Raleigh, North Carolina	Regional Finals
1981 – 9 Seed
Houston	W	90–72	Charlotte Coliseum	Charlotte, North Carolina	First round
Virginia	L	50–54	Charlotte Coliseum	Charlotte, North Carolina	Second Round
1980 – 8 Seed
Marquette	W	77–59	Providence Civic Center	Providence, Rhode Island	First round
Syracuse	L	83–97	Providence Civic Center	Providence, Rhode Island	Second Round
1978 – Elite 8
La Salle	W	103–97	Palestra	Philadelphia	First round
Indiana	W	61–60	Providence Civic Center	Providence, Rhode Island	Regional semifinals
Duke	L	72–90	Providence Civic Center	Providence, Rhode Island	Regional Finals
1972 – Sweet 16
East Carolina	W	85–70	Jadwin Gymnasium	Princeton, New Jersey	First round
Pennsylvania	L	67–78	WVU Coliseum	Morgantown, West Virginia	Regional semifinals
South Carolina	L	78–90	WVU Coliseum	Morgantown, West Virginia	Consolation
1971 – NCAA RUNNER-UP (Vacated by the NCAA)
Saint Joseph's	W	93–75	Palestra	Philadelphia	First round
Fordham	W	85–75	Reynolds Coliseum	Raleigh, North Carolina	Regional semifinals
Pennsylvania	W	90–47	Reynolds Coliseum	Raleigh, North Carolina	Regional Finals
Western Kentucky	W	92–89	Astrodome	Houston	National semifinals
UCLA	L	62–68	Astrodome	Houston	national championship
1970 – Elite 8
Temple	W	77–69	Palestra	Philadelphia	First round
Niagara	W	98–73	Carolina Coliseum	Columbia, South Carolina	Regional semifinals
St. Bonaventure	L	74–94	Carolina Coliseum	Columbia, South Carolina	Regional Finals
1969
Davidson	L	61–75	Reynolds Coliseum	Raleigh, North Carolina	First round
1964 – Sweet 16
Providence	W	77–66	Palestra	Philadelphia	First round
Duke	L	73–87	Reynolds Coliseum	Raleigh, North Carolina	Regional semifinals
Princeton	W	74–62	Reynolds Coliseum	Raleigh, North Carolina	Consolation
1962 – Elite 8
West Virginia	W	90–75	Palestra	Philadelphia	First round
NYU	W	79–70	Cole Field House	College Park, Maryland	Regional semifinals
Wake Forest	L	69–79	Cole Field House	College Park, Maryland	Regional Finals
1955 – Sweet 16
Duke	W	74–73	Madison Square Garden	New York City	First round
Canisius	L	71–73	Palestra	Philadelphia	Regional semifinals
Princeton	W	64–57	Palestra	Philadelphia	Consolation
1951 – Sweet 16
North Carolina State	L	62–67			Regional semifinals
1949 – Elite 8
Kentucky	L	72–85	Madison Square Garden	New York City	Regional Finals
Yale	W	78–67	Madison Square Garden	New York City	Consolation
1939 – NCAA FINAL FOUR
Brown	W	42–30	Palestra	Philadelphia	Regional Finals
Ohio State	L	36–53	Palestra	Philadelphia	National semifinals

=== NCAA Tournament Seeding History ===
The NCAA began seeding the tournament with the 1979 edition.

Years →	'80	'81	'82	'83	'84	'85	'86	'88	'90	'91	'95	'96	'97	'99	'05	'06	'07	'08	'09	'10	'11	'13	'14	'15	'16	'17	'18	'19	'21	'22
Seeds →	8	9	3	3	7	8	10	6	12	9	3	3	4	8	5	1	9	12	3	2	9	9	2	1	2	1	1	6	5	2

=== NIT history ===
The Wildcats have appeared in the National Invitation Tournament (NIT) 19 times. Their combined record is 24–19. They were NIT Champions in 1994.

Year	Round	Opponent	Result
1959	First Round	St. John's	L 67–75
1960	First Round; Quarterfinals	Detroit; Utah State	W 88–86; L 72–73
1963	First Round; Quarterfinals; Semifinals; 3rd-place game	DePaul; Wichita State; Canisius; Marquette	W 63–51; W 54–53; L 46–61; L 58–66
1965	Quarterfinals; Semifinals; Finals	Manhattan; NYU; St. John's	W 73–71; W 91–69; L 51–55
1966	First Round; Quarterfinals; Semifinals; 3rd-place game	St. John's; Boston College; NYU; Army	W 63–61; W 86–85; L 63–78; W 76–65
1967	First Round	Marshall	L 68–70
1968	First Round; Quarterfinals	Wyoming; Kansas	W 77–66; L 49–55
1977	First Round; Quarterfinals; Semifinals; 3rd-place game	Old Dominion; Massachusetts; St. Bonaventure; Alabama	W 71–68; W 81–71; L 82–86; W 102–89
1987	First Round	La Salle	L 84–86
1989	First Round; Second round Quarterfinals	Saint Peter's; Penn State; Michigan State	W 76–56; W 76–67; L 63–70
1992	First Round	Virginia	L 80–83
1994	First Round; Second round Quarterfinals; Semifinals; Finals	Canisius; Duquesne; Xavier; Siena; Vanderbilt	W 103–79; W 82–66; W 76–74; W 66–58; W 80–73
2000	First Round; Second round	Delaware; Kent State	W 72–63; L 67–81
2001	First Round	Minnesota	L 78–87
2002	First Round; Second round Quarterfinals	Manhattan; Louisiana Tech; Temple	W 84–69; W 67–64; L 57–63
2003	Opening Round	Siena	L 59–74
2004	First Round; Second round Quarterfinals	Drexel; Virginia; Rutgers	W 85–70; W 73–63; L 60–72
2023	First Round	Liberty	L 57–62
2024	First Round	VCU	L 61-70

=== National Campus Basketball Tournament results ===
The Wildcats appeared in the only National Campus Basketball Tournament. Their record is 0–1.

Year	Round	Opponent	Result
1951	Quarterfinals	Utah	L 65–67

=== CBC results ===
The Wildcats have appeared in the College Basketball Crown once. Their overall record is 2–1.

Year	Round	Opponent	Result
2025	First Round; Quarterfinals; Semifinals	Colorado; USC; UCF	W 85–64; W 60–59; L 98–104^{OT}

== Basketball Hall of Fame ==
- Paul Arizin '50, inducted 1978.
- Rollie Massimino, coached Villanova to first national championship in 1985, inducted 2013
- Jay Wright, two-time National Championship winning coach, inducted 2021

== Individual honors ==
Villanova honors outstanding former players, coaches, and others by retiring their numbers or jerseys. For those honored, a replica jersey is hung in the rafters of the Pavilion. Uniform numbers of retired jerseys remain in circulation, while retired numbers are no longer used. Paul Arizin's #11 is the only retired number. As of 2019, 21 have been honored with a retired number or jersey, including 16 players, four coaches, and longtime trainer Jake Nevin.

=== Retired numbers ===
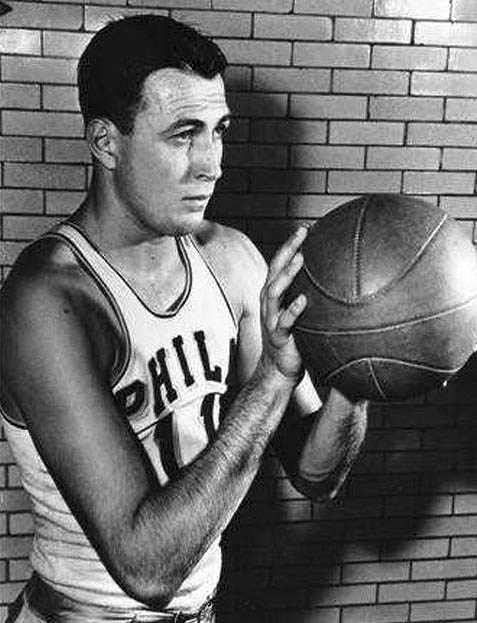
Paul Arizin, the only player to have his number retired by Villanova

Villanova Wildcats retired numbers
No.	Player	Pos.	Career	No. ret.	Ref.
11	Paul Arizin	SF	1947–50		

=== Retired/honored jerseys ===
The honorees include:

- Al Severance, Coach.
- Jack Kraft, Coach.
- Rollie Massimino, Coach (1973–92). Jersey retired in 2005.
- No. 1 Jake Nevin, longtime trainer. Jersey retired in 1984.
- No. 1 Kyle Lowry (2004–2006). Jersey retired in 2020.
- No. 1 Jalen Brunson (2015–2018). Jersey retired in 2022.
- No. 2 Randy Foye (2002–2006). Jersey retired in 2011.
- No. 3 Josh Hart (2013–2017). Jersey retired in 2022.
- No. 11 Paul Arizin (1947–1950). Jersey retired in 1994.
- No. 14 Larry Hennessy (1950–1953).
- No. 14 Allan Ray (2002–2006). Jersey retired in 2019.
- No. 14 Hubie White (1959–1962). Jersey retired in 2001.
- No. 15 Ryan Arcidiacono (2012–2016). Jersey retired in 2020.
- No. 24 Wali Jones (1961–1964). Jersey retired in 1995.
- No. 24 Tom Ingelsby (1970–1973). Jersey retired in 2006.
- No. 25 Bill Melchionni (1963–1966). Jersey retired in 1995.
- No. 25 Bob Schafer (1951–1955).
- No. 30 Kerry Kittles (1992–1996). Jersey retired in 1998.
- No. 33 Keith Herron (1974–1978).
- No. 42 Chris Ford (1969–1972). Jersey retired in 2006.
- No. 45 John Pinone (1979–1983). Jersey retired in 1995.
- No. 50 Jim Washington (1962–1965). Jersey retired in 1995.
- No. 54 Howard Porter (1968–1971). Jersey retired in 2019.
- No. 54 Ed Pinckney (1981–1985)

== Villanova career records ==
Games played	Collin Gillespie – 156 games
Rebounds	Howard Porter – 1,325 rebounds
Assists	Kenny Wilson – 627 assists
Steals	Kerry Kittles – 277 steals
Blocks	Jason Lawson – 375 blocks
Points Scored	Eric Dixon – 2,314 points

=== All-time career leaders ===
Points
Rank	Player	Years	Points
1.	Kerry Kittles	1992–96	2,243
2.	Scottie Reynolds	2006–10	2,222
3.	Keith Herron	1974–78	2,170
4.	Bob Schafer	1951–55	2,094
5.	Doug West	1985–89	2,037
6.	Howard Porter	1968–71	2,026
7.	Allan Ray	2002–06	2,025
8.	John Pinone	1979–83	2,024
9.	Randy Foye	2002–06	1,966
10.	Josh Hart	2013–17	1,921
11.	Ed Pinckney	1981–85	1,865
12.	Gary Buchanan	1999–03	1,799
13.	Larry Hennessy	1950–53	1,737
14.	Jalen Brunson	2015–18	1,667
15.	Corey Fisher	2007–11	1,652
16.	Curtis Sumpter	2002–07	1,651
17.	Paul Arizin	1947–50	1,648
18.	Alex Bradley	1977–81	1,634
19.	Tom Ingelsby	1970–73	1,616
20.	Bill Melchionni	1963–66	1,612

Rebounds
Rank	Player	Years	Rebounds
1.	Howard Porter	1968–71	1,317
2.	Jim Washington	1962–65	1,194
3.	Jack Devine	1951–55	1,181
4.	Ed Pinckney	1981–85	1,107
5.	Harold Pressley	1982–86	1,016
6.	Jim Mooney	1950–53	1,010
7.	Daniel Ochefu	2012–16	929
8.	Jason Lawson	1993–97	908
9.	Brooks Sales	1998–02	858
10.	John Pinone	1979–83	837
11.	Mouphtaou Yarou	2009–13	836
12.	George Raveling	1957–60	835
13.	Dante Cunningham	2005–09	819
14.	Josh Hart	2013–17	812
15.	Alex Bradley	1977–81	797
16.	Curtis Sumpter	2002–07	794
17.	Antonio Peña	2007–11	765
18.	Hubie White	1959–62	755
19.	Hank Siemiontkowski	1969–72	739
20.	JayVaughn Pinkston	2011–15	737

Assists
Rank	Player	Years	Assists
1.	Kenny Wilson	1985–89	627
2.	Stewart Granger	1979–83	595
3.	Alvin Williams	1993–97	553
4.	Ryan Arcidiacono	2012–16	535
5.	Chris Ford	1969–72	500
6.	Rory Sparrow	1976–80	495
7.	Corey Fisher	2007–11	487
8.	Scottie Reynolds	2006–10	482
9.	Joe Rogers	1973–77	474
10.	Gary McLain	1981–85	456

Steals
Rank	Player	Years	Steals
1.	Kerry Kittles	1992–96	277
2.	Harold Pressley	1982–86	216
3.	Scottie Reynolds	2002–06	207
4.	Gary Massey	1985–89	204
5.	Alvin Williams	1993–97	200
6.	Randy Foye	2002–06	198
7.	Ed Pinckney	1981–85	196
8.	Lance Miller	1989–93	190
9.	Chris Walker	1988–92	185
10.	Stewart Granger	1979–83	181

Blocks
Rank	Player	Years	Blocks
1.	Jason Lawson	1993–97	375
2.	Ed Pinckney	1981–85	253
3.	Tom Greis	1986–90	237
4.	Malik Allen	1996–00	191
5.	Daniel Ochefu	2012–16	182
6.	Jason Fraser	2002–06	172
7.	Harold Pressley	1982–86	152
8.	Will Sheridan	2003–07	146
9.	Dante Cunningham	2005–09	117
10.	Brooks Sales	1998–02	111

== Wildcats in the NBA/ABA ==
=== Villanova's All-Time NBA/ABA roster ===
- Malik Allen '00
- Ryan Arcidiacono '16
- Paul Arizin '50
- Saddiq Bey '20
- Alex Bradley '81
- Michael Bradley '01
- Thomas Brennan '52
- Mikal Bridges '18
- Jalen Brunson '18
- John Celestand '99
- Dante Cunningham '09
- Donte DiVincenzo '18
- Chris Ford '72
- Randy Foye '06
- Stewart Granger '83
- Josh Hart '17
- Larry Hennessy '53
- Keith Herron '78
- Darrun Hilliard '15
- Tom Hoover '61
- Tom Ingelsby '72
- Wali Jones '64
- Kerry Kittles '96
- Herman Red Klotz '44
- Jason Lawson '97
- Kyle Lowry '06
- Dwayne McClain '85
- Bill Melchionni '66
- Jim Mooney '53
- Richie Moore '64
- Fran O'Hanlon '70
- Daniel Ochefu '16
- John Olive '77
- Ed Pinckney '85
- John Pinone '83
- Howard Porter '71
- Harold Pressley '86
- Sherwin Raiken '50
- Allan Ray '06
- Bob Schafer '55
- Rory Sparrow '80
- Arthur Spector '41
- Tim Thomas '97
- Maalik Wayns '12
- Jim Washington '65
- Doug West '89
- Hubie White '62
- Cam Whitmore '23
- Alvin Williams '97

=== Members of professional championship teams ===
- 1948 Baltimore Bullets (BBA) – Herman "Red" Klotz
- 1956 Philadelphia Warriors (NBA) – Paul Arizin, Larry Hennessy
- 1967 Philadelphia 76ers (NBA) – Wali Jones, Bill Melchionni
- 1974/1976 New Jersey Nets (ABA) – Bill Melchionni
- 1981 Boston Celtics (NBA) – Chris Ford
- 2000 Los Angeles Lakers (NBA) – John Celestand
- 2019 Toronto Raptors (NBA) – Kyle Lowry
- 2021 Milwaukee Bucks (NBA) – Donte DiVincenzo
- 2023 Denver Nuggets (NBA) - Collin Gillespie
- 2026 New York Knicks (NBA) - Jalen Brunson, Josh Hart, Mikal Bridges

=== Villanova players currently in the NBA ===
Year	Player	Current team	Draft Pick
2016	Ryan Arcidiacono	Windy City Bulls	Undrafted
2017	Josh Hart	New York Knicks	1st Round 30th Pick Overall
2018	Mikal Bridges	New York Knicks	1st Round 10th Pick Overall
2018	Donte DiVincenzo	Minnesota Timberwolves	1st Round 17th Pick Overall
2018	Jalen Brunson	New York Knicks	2nd Round 33rd Pick Overall
2020	Saddiq Bey	New Orleans Pelicans	1st Round 19th Overall
2021	Jeremiah Robinson-Earl	New Orleans Pelicans	2nd Round 32nd Pick Overall
2022	Collin Gillespie	Phoenix Suns	Undrafted
2023	Cam Whitmore	Washington Wizards	1st Round 20th Pick Overall

=== Villanova players currently in the NBA G-League ===
Year	Player	Current team	NBA Affiliate
2025	Wooga Poplar	Windy City Bulls	Bulls
2025	Eric Dixon	Memphis Hustle	Grizzlies
2024	Mark Armstrong	Texas Legends	Mavericks
2024	Tyler Burton	Memphis Hustle	Grizzlies

=== Villanova players currently in international leagues ===
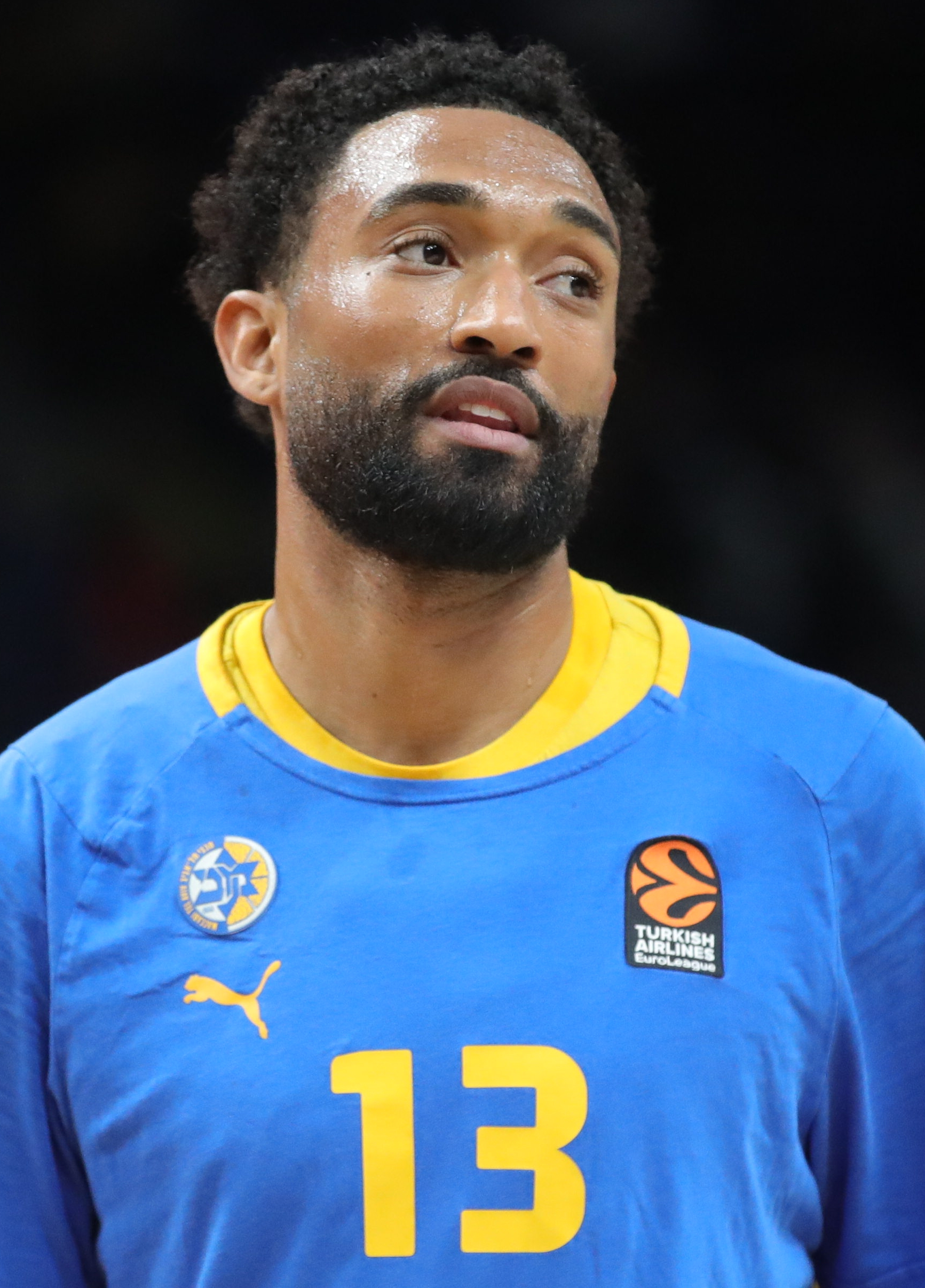
Darrun Hilliard

Year	Player	Current team	Country
2014	James Bell	Yamagata Wyverns	(Japan)
2015	Darrun Hilliard	Bilbao Basket	(Spain)
2018	Omari Spellman	Beijing Ducks	(China)
2019	Eric Paschall	Hubei Wenlv	(China)
2019	Phil Booth	JDA Dijon Basket	(France)
2019	Joe Cremo	Básquet Coruña	(Spain)
2022	Jermaine Samuels	San Pablo Burgos	(Spain)
2023	Brandon Slater	Knox Raiders	(Australia)
2023	Caleb Daniels	BC Oostende	(Belgium)

=== Villanova records in the NBA ===
Games played	Kyle Lowry – 948 games
Minutes Played	Kyle Lowry – 28,077 minutes
Rebounds	Jim Washington – 6,637 rebounds
Assists	Kyle Lowry – 5,912 assists
Steals	Kyle Lowry – 1,276 steals
Blocks	Ed Pinckney – 435 blocks
Points Scored	Kyle Lowry– 16,356 points

=== Villanovans drafted ===
Draft Year	Player	Draft Pick	Draft Team	Years	Career Highlights and Awards
1942	Red Klotz	No NBA	Baltimore Bullets	1947-1948	BAA champion (1948)
1950	Paul Arizin	Territorial Pick	Philadelphia Warriors	1950-1962	NBA champion (1956); 10× NBA All-Star (1951, 1952, 1955–1962); NBA All-Star Game MVP (1952); 3× All-NBA First Team (1952, 1956, 1957); All-NBA Second Team (1959); 2× NBA scoring champion (1952, 1957); NBA anniversary team (25th, 50th, 75th)
1952	Tom Brennan	Round 5, Pick 43	Philadelphia Warriors	1954-1955	
1953	Larry Hennessy	Territorial Pick	Philadelphia Warriors	1955-1957	NBA champion (1956)
1959	Joe Ryan	Round 7, Pick 3	Philadelphia Warriors		
1960	George Raveling	Round 8, Pick 7	Philadelphia Warriors		
1962	Hubie White	Round 2, Pick 7	Philadelphia Warriors	1962-1964	
1963	Tom Hoover	Round 1, Pick 6	Syracuse Nationals		
1964	Wali Jones	Round 3, Pick 2	Detroit Pistons	1964-1976	NBA champion (1967); NBA All-Rookie First Team (1965)
1965	Jim Washington	Round 1, Pick 5	St. Louis Hawks	1965-1976	
1965	Richie Moore	Round 5, Pick 5	Philadelphia 76ers		
1966	Bill Melchionni	Round 2, Pick 9	Philadelphia 76ers	1966-1976	NBA champion (1967); 2× ABA champion (1974, 1976); 3× ABA All-Star (1971–1973); 3× ABA assists leader (1971–1973); All-ABA First Team (1972)
1967	Frank Gadjunas	Round 12, Pick 6	Cincinnati Royals		
1968	Joe Crews	Round 16, Pick 8	Philadelphia 76ers		
1969	Johnny Jones	Round 6, Pick 13	Philadelphia 76ers		
1970	Fran O'Hanlon	Round 8, Pick 12	Philadelphia 76ers		
1971	Howard Porter	Round 2, Pick 15	Chicago Bulls	1971-1978	
1971	Clarence Smith	Round 9, Pick 7	San Francisco Warriors		
1972	Chris Ford	Round 2, Pick 4	Detroit Pistons	1972-1982	NBA champion (1981)
1972	Hank Siemiontkowski	Round 4, Pick 3	Cleveland Cavaliers		
1973	Tom Ingelsby	Round 2, Pick 9	Atlanta Hawks	1973-1976	
1973	Ed Hastings	Round 11, Pick 9	Boston Celtics		
1977	John Olive	Round 8, Pick 20	Philadelphia 76ers	1978-1980	
1978	Keith Herron	Round 2, Pick 2	Portland Trail Blazers	1978-1982	
1980	Rory Sparrow	Round 4, Pick 6	New Jersey Nets	1980-1992	
1981	Alex Bradley	Round 4, Pick 17	New York Knicks	1981-1982	
1981	Tom Sienkiewicz	Round 7, Pick 7	Seattle SuperSonics		
1982	Aaron Howard	Round 5, Pick 6	New York Knicks		
1983	Stewart Granger	Round 1, Pick 24	Cleveland Cavaliers	1983-1987	
1983	John Pinone	Round 3, Pick 11	Atlanta Hawks	1983-1984	
1983	Mike Mulquin	Round 8, Pick 19	Phoenix Suns		
1984	Frank Dobbs	Round 8, Pick 21	Philadelphia 76ers		
1985	Ed Pinckney	Round 1, Pick 10	Phoenix Suns	1985-1997	
1985	Dwayne McClain	Round 2, Pick 3	Indiana Pacers	1985-1986	
1985	Gary McLain	Round 7, Pick 15	New Jersey Nets		
1986	Harold Pressley	Round 1, Pick 17	Sacramento Kings	1986-1990	
1986	Chuck Everson	Round 6, Pick 14	Utah Jazz		
1987	Harold Jensen	Round 6, Pick 7	Cleveland Cavaliers		
1989	Doug West	Round 2, Pick 11	Minnesota Timberwolves	1989-2001	
1996	Kerry Kittles	Round 1, Pick 8	New Jersey Nets	1996-2005	
1997	Tim Thomas	Round 1, Pick 7	New Jersey Nets	1997-2010	NBA All-Rookie Second Team (1998)
1997	Jason Lawson	Round 2, Pick 13	Denver Nuggets	1997-1998	
1997	Alvin Williams	Round 2, Pick 19	Portland Trail Blazers	1997-2007	
1999	John Celestand	Round 2, Pick 1	Los Angeles Lakers	1999-2000	NBA champion (2000)
2001	Michael Bradley	Round 1, Pick 17	Toronto Raptors	2001-2006	
2006	Randy Foye	Round 1, Pick 7	Boston Celtics	2006-2017	NBA All-Rookie First Team (2007)
2006	Kyle Lowry	Round 1, Pick 24	Memphis Grizzlies	2006-2026	NBA champion (2019); 6× NBA All-Star (2015–2020); All-NBA Third Team (2016)
2009	Dante Cunningham	Round 2, Pick 3	Portland Trail Blazers	2009-2019	
2015	Darrun Hilliard	Round 2, Pick 8	Detroit Pistons	2015-2018	
2017	Josh Hart	Round 1, Pick 30	Utah Jazz	2017-present	NBA champion (2026); NBA Cup champion (2025)
2018	Mikal Bridges	Round 1, Pick 10	Philadelphia 76ers	2018-present	NBA champion (2026); NBA All-Defensive First Team (2022; NBA Cup champion (2025)
2018	Donte DiVincenzo	Round 1, Pick 17	Milwaukee Bucks	2018-present	NBA champion (2021)
2018	Omari Spellman	Round 1, Pick 30	Atlanta Hawks	2018-2020	
2018	Jalen Brunson	Round 2, Pick 3	Dallas Mavericks	2018-present	NBA champion (2026); NBA Finals MVP (2026); 3× NBA All-Star (2024–2026); 3× All-NBA Second Team (2024–2026); NBA Cup champion (2025); NBA Cup MVP (2025)
2019	Eric Paschall	Round 2, Pick 11	Golden State Warriors	2019-2022	NBA All-Rookie First Team (2020)
2020	Saddiq Bey	Round 1, Pick 19	Detroit Pistons	2020-present	NBA All-Rookie First Team (2021)
2021	Jeremiah Robinson-Earl	Round 2, Pick 2	Oklahoma City Thunder	2021-present	
2023	Cam Whitmore	Round 1, Pick 20	Houston Rockets	2023-present	

== Rivals ==
=== Big East ===
Some Villanovans count Georgetown as their most intense rivalry, having played a historic NCAA Championship game and many competitive Big East tournament and regular season games against the Hoyas. Other rivals from the Big East Conference include founding members of the original Big East—Providence (an eastern rivalry which predates the original Big East) and St. John's, plus Syracuse who left the Big East as part of its 2013 split for the ACC.

Seton Hall has played Villanova more than any other school; due to the proximity of the schools and a series of memorable games since the formation of the new Big East, this has become one of Villanova's top rivalries each season. Games have included critical Seton Hall upsets in 2013, the 2014 Big East tournament, Villanova's first loss of 2015, and the 2016 Big East tournament championship as well as a Villanova blowout in a game that resulted in Seton Hall guard Sterling Gibbs punching Villanova guard Ryan Arcidiacono in 2015 and a narrow victory in the closing seconds of the 2017 Big East tournament semifinals.

=== Big Five ===
Villanova along with Saint Joseph's University, La Salle University, Temple University, and University of Pennsylvania banded together to create the Philadelphia Big 5 in 1954–55. From that date until the mid-1970s all Big 5 games were contested at the Palestra (cap. 9,208) on Penn's campus. The Five competed in a round-robin City Series. Additionally, all participated in numerous doubleheaders against non-Big 5 opponents. Most games were televised locally on WPHL-TV, broadcast by Harry Kalas.

Since the beginning of the 1996–1997 season, Villanova has won 15 out of 21 Big 5 titles. They currently have 25 total Big 5 titles which is second most among the participating schools.

Villanova's most bitter Big 5 rival is Saint Joseph's University, in what has become known as the Holy War.

== Traditions ==
Villanova basketball athletes traditionally remain enrolled four years, graduate, and go on to enjoy post-college success. Villanova has never fired a head basketball coach (men's or women's). Villanova has won more NCAA tournament games as a lower seed than any school. Villanova won what has been called the greatest college basketball game ever played, defeating Georgetown 66–64 on April 1, 1985, to win the NCAA national championship.

=== Songs ===
V for Villanova is the Wildcats' fight song. Other Villanova songs include March of the Wildcats.

=== Streamers ===
Villanova had a tradition of throwing paper streamers in the school colors of blue and white onto the basketball court at home games, particularly Big Five games, after the first Wildcat basket. This tradition was shared by other Big Five basketball teams, and at Big Five games, streamers were thrown by both teams following their team's first field goal. The tradition was stopped in the late 1980s after the NCAA declared that throwing streamers would result in a technical foul. Since then Villanova has restarted the tradition, throwing the streamers on the first basket of the new season during the blue and white scrimmage game during Hoops Mania.

=== Hoops Mania ===
Hoops Mania has been an annual tradition to celebrate the start of basketball season. It was originally held in the Jake Nevin Fieldhouse for students and has since grown larger after the success of the 2005–06 season. It is now held in the Pavilion and is open to the public and students. Following an inter-team scrimmage, notable music artists perform.

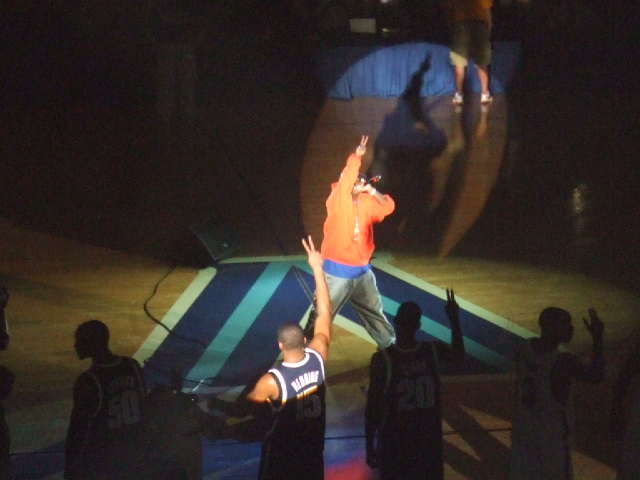
Tony Yayo At Villanova Hoops Mania 06'

- 2006 – G-Unit performers 50 Cent and Tony Yayo
- 2007 – Mims
- 2008 – T-Pain
- 2009 – Trey Songz
- 2010 – Fabolous
- 2011 – Drake
- 2012 – Rick Ross
- 2013 – Nicki Minaj
- 2014 – Schoolboy Q
- 2015 – Big Sean
- 2016 – Wiz Khalifa
- 2017 – French Montana
- 2019 – Swae Lee
- 2021 – Offset
- 2022 – Meek Mill
- 2023 – Rick Ross (II)
- 2024 – Gunna
- 2025 - Roommates show with Jalen Brunson & Josh Hart
