= Alex Bradley (basketball) =

American basketball player (born 1959)

Personal information
- Born: October 30, 1959 (age 67) Bradenton, Florida, U.S.
- Listed height: 6 ft 6 in (1.98 m)
- Listed weight: 215 lb (98 kg)

Career information
- High school: Long Branch (Long Branch, New Jersey)
- College: Villanova (1977–1981)
- NBA draft: 1981: 4th round, 86th overall pick
- Drafted by: New York Knicks
- Playing career: 1981–1988
- Position: Small forward
- Number: 30

Career history
- 1981–1982: New York Knicks
- 1982–1983: Lebole Mestre
- 1983–1984: Valladolid
- 1984–1986: Stade Français
- 1986–1987: Verviers-Pepinster
- 1987–1988: Reims Champagne Basket
- 1988: Philadelphia Aces
- Stats at NBA.com
- Stats at Basketball Reference

Alex Bradley III (born October 30, 1959) is an American retired professional basketball player. He played for the Villanova Wildcats from 1977 to 1981 and for the New York Knicks in the NBA during the 1981–82 NBA season.

== Early life ==
Born in Bradenton, Florida, Bradley played high school basketball for Long Branch High School in Long Branch, New Jersey.

== Career ==
=== College ===
Bradley played collegiately for the Villanova Wildcats from 1977 to 1981. Bradley set the single-game freshman scoring record in 1978, a record remained in place until it was broken by Scottie Reynolds in 2007. Bradley was the first three-year captain at Villanova since 1952. He was selected for the 1981 Big East All-Tournament Team. He led the Wildcats to three NCAA Tournament appearances.

=== NBA ===
Bradley played in the NBA for the New York Knicks during the 1981–82 NBA season.

== Personal life ==
Bradley married future Delaware congresswoman and senator Lisa Blunt, whom he met at Villanova, in the 1980s. They have two children together, a son (b. 1985) and a daughter (b. 1988). They divorced in 2003.

== Career statistics ==
Legend
| GP | Games played | GS | Games started | MPG | Minutes per game |
| FG% | Field goal percentage | 3P% | 3-point field goal percentage | FT% | Free throw percentage |
| RPG | Rebounds per game | APG | Assists per game | SPG | Steals per game |
| BPG | Blocks per game | PPG | Points per game | **Bold** | Career high |

=== NBA ===
==== Regular season ====
| Year | Team | GP | GS | MPG | FG% | 3P% | FT% | RPG | APG | SPG | BPG | PPG |
|---|---|---|---|---|---|---|---|---|---|---|---|---|
| 1981–82 | New York | 39 | 0 | 8.5 | .524 | .000 | .604 | 1.7 | .3 | .3 | .1 | 3.5 |
