= Victory Auto Wreckers =

Former American wrecking yard corporation

- Type: Corporation
- Industry: Retail, Wrecking yard
- Founded: 1945
- Defunct: 30 November 2023; 2 years ago
- Headquarters: Bensenville, Illinois, USA
- Key people: Kyle Weisner, Owner and Manager
- Products: Scrap metal, Used car parts, Automobiles
- Website: www.victoryautowreckers.com

Victory Auto Wreckers was an auto salvage yard in Bensenville, Illinois, near Chicago's O'Hare International Airport. It is well known in the Chicago area for its former television commercial, in which a young man struggles with a car door that has just detached from its hinges. The commercial aired with limited changes from 1985 to 2015, making it the subject of frequent discussion in the local media. The Chicago Sun-Times once described the advertisement as "an indelible commercial image known to almost any television viewer."

== Business ==
Victory Auto Wreckers was founded in the 1940s by a pair of World War II veterans. The company was purchased by Kenneth Weisner in 1967 and is now owned by his son, Kyle. Victory purchased wrecked or decommissioned vehicles and then allowed customers to browse through their lots in search of workable parts. Any unusable parts were crushed and sold to scrap metal dealers. As of 2005, the 10-acre (40,000 m^{2}) facility was processing approximately 14,000 automobiles every year.

In 2002, the Bensenville Community Development Commission threatened to close Victory Auto Wreckers within two years as part of a zoning ordinance prohibiting junkyards, incinerators and wrecking yards. However, appellate court judge Robert McLaren ruled that the facility should be considered a recycling center, allowing the business to remain in operation.

In November 2023, it was announced that the business would permanently close at the end of the month, with November 18 being the last day the yard would take in vehicles.

== Advertising ==
Victory aired its first television commercial in 1981. By 1985, the video of the advertisement had deteriorated, and Victory turned to commercial director Ron Patris to create a replacement. That replacement commercial, filmed on May 20, 1985, remained on the air for nearly 30 years, with some minor modifications. According to one estimate, the spot appeared on WGN-TV and other stations up to 30 times per week. Television historian Steve Jajkowski argued that the commercial was "as much a part of Chicago TV as Bozo the Clown, Fahey Flynn and Svengoolie."

The 1985 commercial was filmed in a residential area near the salvage yard. It starred Bob Zajdel, a shaggy-haired young man who had been working for Victory at the time. In the commercial, Zajdel attempts to enter his noticeably old and run-down car, but his car door suddenly detaches from its hinges and falls to the ground. An exasperated Zajdel jumps back (possibly to avoid shattering glass from the car door's window) and sighs in frustration, but an announcer advises that the car may be worth money, and briefly describes Victory's services. In the next scene, Zajdel receives a cash payment when a tow truck from Victory arrives to take his car.

Victory introduced some changes to the commercial between 1985 and 2015; later versions had new announcers (including Dean Richards for airings on WGN and Rich Koz for airings on WCIU-TV and MeTV) and some new graphics, along with several area code updates to the on-screen phone number and eventually, Victory's web address. However, the footage remained the same, as evidenced by Zajdel's period clothing and hairstyle. Radio personality Steve Dahl joked, "I've always been a fan of the ultra-wide watchband and the mullet – or perhaps in those days it was called a gypsy shag." Zajdel was never paid extra for his role in the commercial, but he has become a minor local celebrity, appearing in several newspaper interviews. He remarked to the Chicago Tribune, "I still own the shirt I wore. And I still have the watchband from the commercial. . . I should take the watchband and the shirt, with a Victory T-shirt, and put them on eBay. I could make some money off it."

Kyle Weisner said of the advertisement, "There are companies that do a lot of advertising, like, for example Empire, but they change their commercials weekly. With us, our message is the same, so we've never felt the need to change it."

In May 2015, however, Victory Auto Wreckers retired their famous commercial in favor of a new spot produced by Xpress Video Productions of Northbrook, Illinois. The new commercial featured a computer-animated homage to the 1985 footage.

== See also ==
- Celozzi-Ettleson Chevrolet
- Eagle Insurance
- Empire Today
- Moo and Oink
- Peter Francis Geraci
- Walter E. Smithe
