= Moo & Oink =

Meat company and wholesaler based in Chicago, Illinois

- Formerly: Calumet Meat Company
- Industry: Meat company
- Founded: 35th and Calumet Avenue, Chicago, Illinois
- Founder: Joe Lezak
- Headquarters: Chicago, Illinois, United States
- Products: Hot links
- Parent: Best Chicago Meat Co.

Moo & Oink is a Chicago, Illinois-based brand of hot links and other foods, and originated at Calumet Foods, a meat company and wholesaler.

== History ==
=== Founding ===
The company Calumet Meat Co. was founded by Joe Lezak, whose family had a long history of selling meat products in Chicago. Its original location was at the corner of 35th and Calumet Avenue on Chicago's South Side. They sold a variety of meats including pork, chicken, beef, and lamb. The company specialized in selling to soul food restaurants and BBQs. In the 1960s, the company moved to a larger location at 3831 S. Halsted Avenue in Bridgeport, Chicago.

=== Moo & Oink ===
Moo & Oink became mascots for the brand and eventually became the face and name of the entire Calumet Meat brand in 1976 when the company was rebranded as "Moo & Oink." It was well known for its promotional events and local advertisement campaigns. Its late-night television commercials played through the late 1970s into the 21st century. The company's mascots Moo (a cow) and Oink (a pig) were prominently featured in a long-running series of commercials featuring a boisterous rap by Pierre B. Johnson that debuted in 1982. In 2005, Tina Fey and Amy Poehler sang the opening verse of the jingle on Saturday Night Live's Weekend Update in order to prove to Scott Podsednik that they were Chicago White Sox fans.

=== Expansion ===
The company expanded in the 1980s to included branded products. These products were discontinued after a change in Moo and Oink management in October 2006. In April 2010, the remaining owners revealed a new company logo with updated art of Moo & Oink, the cow and pig characters. A new character "Gobble" was also created to represent the new turkey hot and mild link products.

=== Bankruptcy & sale ===
Due to a drop in sales and a shrinking customer base, Moo & Oink retail stores and meat company went into Chapter 7 bankruptcy on September 30, 2011 and the stores were all closed in 2011. By the end of the year, the brand, trademark, and recipes were sold to Best Chicago Meat Co., who had already been producing some of the Moo & Oink products. The store locations themselves remained unsold.

== Current product line ==
Today Moo & Oink products are sold at a wide range of grocery stores across Chicago, especially across the south and west sides.

== See also ==
- Celozzi-Ettleson Chevrolet
- Eagle Insurance
- Empire Today
- Victory Auto Wreckers
- Peter Francis Geraci
- Walter E. Smithe
