= Eagle Insurance =

Vehicle insurance agency based in Chicago

Screenshot from original 1993 "Eagle Man" commercial (played by Mitch Laue)

Eagle Insurance is a vehicle insurance agency based in Chicago, Illinois, which has been serving residents of the metropolitan area since 1961. It is best known for its unusual, low-budget television commercials featuring the egg-laying "Eagle Man," an actor in a bald eagle costume.

== Advertising ==
The first, and best known, of the Eagle Insurance television spots was created in 1993 by RDR Productions of Glenview, Illinois. In the commercial, two young women are riding in an automobile when they suddenly hear a loud thud emanating from the roof of their car. Having no vehicle insurance, they realize they have been visited by Eagle Man, who speaks in a slow, deep voice and proclaims, "I've … got … something … for … you!" He then squats down and inexplicably lays an oversized egg, out of which hatches a hand puppet. The chick presents a piece of paper listing Eagle's vehicle insurance rates, and the women exclaim in unison, "Ohhh, look at those low rates." An announcer then provides a detailed description of all of Eagle Insurance's services.

The original version of the commercial quickly gained a cult following in the Chicago area, and RDR responded with a series of equally unusual "sequels." One sequel replaced Eagle Man with "Eagle Woman," and featured a cameo by radio personality Erich "Mancow" Muller, a fan of the original spot. All of these advertisements have been dubbed in Spanish. In addition, a radio advertisement featuring the "Eagle Man Rap" aired in the Chicago area for several years. RDR most recently produced an updated version of the original television spot which incorporates CGI effects to portray Eagle Man's frequently-mentioned egg-laying scene.

The Eagle Man commercials continue to incite discussion among Chicagoans. In 2002, they were honored with the "Fool of the Year" award at the grand opening of Chicago's Noble Fool Theater, and references to the commercial frequently appear in Chicago newspapers and magazines. The commercials have even gained some fame outside of the Chicago area, having appeared on Late Night with David Letterman, The Soup, in E!'s special called Wildest TV Commercial Moments, and in a BBC special about American advertising. Maxim Online also declared the spots as some of the "crappiest commercials ever" in 2007. In 2010, the commercial ranked 4th in worst commercials ever on The Smoking Gun and on March 1, 2011, the commercial was seen on ABC News' Nightline in a segment titled "Slogans Gone Wrong" featured among numerous national brand TV campaigns long since forgotten. David Wechsler, the director and producer of the commercials, has said, "Obviously, we succeeded beyond our wildest dreams. […] I have produced and directed some top flight projects for literally hundreds of clients, but among those who know me personally, I will always be associated with 'I've got something for you!'" As part of an ad campaign promoting their 2019 Chicago Blackhawks Annual summer convention, the Blackhawks, starring Patrick Sharp and Adam Burish, created an authorized shot for shot parody of the original Eagleman commercial in 4:3 SD

== See also ==
- Celozzi-Ettleson Chevrolet
- Empire Today
- Victory Auto Wreckers
- Moo & Oink
- Peter Francis Geraci
- Harold's Chicken Shack
- Walter E. Smithe
- Luna Carpet
