= 1977–78 Western Kentucky Hilltoppers basketball team =

American college basketball season

1977–78 Western Kentucky Hilltoppers basketball

OVC Tournament Champion

NCAA Tournament, Sweet Sixteen
- Conference: Ohio Valley Conference
- Record: 16–14 (9–5 OVC)
- Head coach: Jim Richards
- Home arena: E. A. Diddle Arena

1977–78 Ohio Valley Conference men's basketball standings
	Conf.				Overall
Team	W		L	PCT	W		L	PCT
Middle Tennessee	10	–	4	.714	18	–	8	.692
East Tennessee State	10	–	4	.714	18	–	9	.667
Western Kentucky†	9	–	5	.643	16	–	14	.533
Austin Peay State	8	–	6	.571	15	–	12	.556
Eastern Kentucky	8	–	6	.571	15	–	11	.577
Tennessee Tech	7	–	7	.500	11	–	15	.423
Murray State	4	–	10	.286	8	–	17	.320
Morehead State	0	–	14	.000	4	–	19	.174
† 1978 OVC tournament winner Rankings from AP Poll

The 1977–78 Western Kentucky Hilltoppers men's basketball team represented Western Kentucky University during the 1977–78 NCAA Division I men's basketball season. The Hilltoppers were members of the Ohio Valley Conference and led by coach Jim Richards, in his final year at the helm. WKU finished third in the OVC regular season, but won the tournament championship and the conference's automatic bid to the 1978 NCAA Division I Basketball Tournament, where they advanced to the sweet sixteen. James Johnson and Darryl Turner made the All-OVC Team and Aaron Bryant was selected to the OVC Tournament Team.

== Schedule ==
Date time, TV	Rank^{#}	Opponent^{#}	Result	Record	Site city, state
Regular season
11/26/1977*		No. 13 Michigan	L 81–87	0–1	E. A. Diddle Arena; Bowling Green, KY
11/30/1977*		at Evansville	W 82–72	1–1	Roberts Municipal Stadium; Evansville, IN
12/3/1977*		at Bowling Green	W 78–65	2–1	Anderson Arena; Bowling Green, OH
12/5/1977*		Memphis State	L 80–86	2–2	E. A. Diddle Arena; Bowling Green, KY
12/7/1977*		Butler	L 86–90	2–3	E. A. Diddle Arena; Bowling Green, KY
12/10/1977*		Wisconsin-Milwaukee	L 70–73	2–4	E. A. Diddle Arena; Bowling Green, KY
12/17/1977*		Cal Poly-San Lius Obispo	W 72–50	3–4	E. A. Diddle Arena; Bowling Green, KY
12/28/1977*		at No. 14 Maryland; Maryland Invitational	L 78–91	3–5	Cole Field House; College Park, MD
12/29/1977*		vs. St. John’s (NY); Maryland Invitational	L 63–80	3–6	Cole Field House; College Park, MD
1/4/1978*		La Salle	L 64–78	3–7	E. A. Diddle Arena; Bowling Green, KY
1/7/1978		at Eastern Kentucky	L 79–85 ^{OT}	3–8 (0-1)	Alumni Coliseum; Richmond, KY
1/9/1978		at Morehead State	W 97–82	4–8 (1-1)	Wetherby Gymnasium; Morehead, KY
1/11/1978*		Jacksonville	W 96–94 ^{OT}	5–8	E. A. Diddle Arena; Bowling Green, KY
1/14/1978		East Tennessee	W 98–94 ^{OT}	6–8 (2-1)	E. A. Diddle Arena; Bowling Green, KY
1/16/1978		Tennessee Tech	W 86–75	7–8 (3-1)	E. A. Diddle Arena; Bowling Green, KY
1/21/1978		Murray State	W 91–75	8–8 (4-1)	E. A. Diddle Arena; Bowling Green, KY
1/23/1978		at Austin Peay	W 91–83	9–8 (5-1)	Dunn Center; Clarksville, TN
1/25/1978*		Dayton	L 72–80	9–9	E. A. Diddle Arena; Bowling Green, KY
1/28/1978		at Middle Tennessee	L 69–98	9–10 (5-2)	Murphy Center; Murfreesboro, TN
2/4/1978		Morehead State	W 106–69	10–10 (6-2)	E. A. Diddle Arena; Bowling Green, KY
2/6/1978		Eastern Kentucky	L 74–78 ^{OT}	10–11 (6-3)	E. A. Diddle Arena; Bowling Green, KY
2/11/1978		at East Tennessee	L 77–80 ^{3OT}	10–12 (6-4)	Memorial Center; Johnson City, TN
2/13/1978		at Tennessee Tech	W 81–69	11–12 (7-4)	Eblen Center; Cookeville, TN
2/18/1978		Austin Peay	L 64–66	11–13 (7-5)	E. A. Diddle Arena; Bowling Green, KY
2/20/1978		at Murray State	W 100–98 ^{OT}	12–13 (8-5)	Racer Arena; Murray, KY
2/25/1978		Middle Tennessee	W 87–78	13–13 (9-5)	E. A. Diddle Arena; Bowling Green, KY
1978 Ohio Valley Conference Men's Basketball Tournament
3/3/1978	(3)	(2) East Tennessee; Semifinals	W 79–75	14–13	E. A. Diddle Arena; Bowling Green, KY
3/4/1978	(3)	(4) Austin Peay; Championship	W 77–69 ^{OT}	15–13	E. A. Diddle Arena; Bowling Green, KY
1978 NCAA Division I Basketball Tournament
3/11/1978*	(4Q ME)	vs. (2L ME) No. 18 Syracuse; First Round	W 87–86 ^{OT}	16–13	Stokely Athletic Center (12,700); Knoxville, TN
3/7/1980*	(4Q ME)	vs. (1Q ME) No. 4 Michigan State; Sweet Sixteen	L 69–90	16–14	UD Arena; Dayton, OH
*Non-conference game. ^{#}Rankings from AP Poll. (#) Tournament seedings in parentheses.
