= Eagleman =

Eagleman may refer to:

- David Eagleman (born 1971), American neuroscientist and author
- Eagleman (comics), a DC Comics character
- 'Eagle Man', the mascot of the low budget Eagle Insurance commercials
