= 1977–78 Illinois Fighting Illini men's basketball team =

American college basketball season

1977–78 Illinois Fighting Illini men's basketball
- Conference: Big Ten Conference
- Record: 13–14 (7–11 Big Ten)
- Head coach: Lou Henson (3rd season)
- Assistant coaches: Tony Yates (4th season); Mark Bial (1st season); Les Wothke (3rd season)
- MVP: Audie Matthews
- Captain: Audie Matthews
- Home arena: Assembly Hall

1977–78 Big Ten Conference men's basketball standings
	Conf.				Overall
Team	W		L	PCT	W		L	PCT
No. 4 Michigan State	15	–	3	.833	25	–	5	.833
No. 13 Indiana	12	–	6	.667	21	–	8	.724
Minnesota	12	–	6	.667	17	–	10	.630
Michigan	11	–	7	.611	16	–	11	.593
Purdue	11	–	7	.611	16	–	11	.593
Ohio State	9	–	9	.500	16	–	11	.593
Illinois	7	–	11	.389	13	–	14	.481
Iowa	5	–	13	.278	12	–	15	.444
Northwestern	4	–	14	.222	8	–	19	.296
Wisconsin	4	–	14	.222	8	–	19	.296
Rankings from AP Poll

The 1977–78 Illinois Fighting Illini men's basketball team represented the University of Illinois.

== Regular season ==
The most significant recruit of the first three years of Head Coach Lou Henson's tenure at Illinois arrived this season. Eddie Johnson was considered to be the most significant piece to reviving the Illini basketball program, a program that had not been to a post-season tournament for 16 years. Johnson, who played at Chicago Westinghouse High School, was one of the state's top seniors and a Parade Magazine All-American. During his senior year at Westinghouse, Johnson, along with teammate Mark Aguirre, became part of a team that went 29–0, losing only in the Public League Final to Wendell Phillips. Prior to choosing Illinois, Johnson visited Southern Cal, Iowa, Michigan and DePaul, but with the encouragement of assistant coach Tony Yates, he selected Illinois.

Along with Johnson, Henson recruited Mark Smith from Peoria Richwoods High School. By season's end, Smith would develop into the team's second leading scorer, finishing the season with 312 points. The team's starting lineup included Neil Bresnahan and Levi Cobb as forwards, Audie Matthews and Reno Gray at the guard positions, and Rich Adams playing center.

=== Roster ===
1977–78 Illinois Fighting Illini men's basketball team
Players
Coaches

Pos.	#	Name	Height	Weight	Year	Previous school	Hometown
G	10	Reno Gray	6 ft 2 in (1.88 m)	170 lb (77 kg)	Jr	Hales Franciscan High School	Chicago, Illinois
F	12	Ken Ferdinand	6 ft 6 in (1.98 m)	200 lb (91 kg)	Jr	Urbana High School	Urbana, Illinois
G	20	Matt Meyer	6 ft 0 in (1.83 m)	165 lb (75 kg)	Jr	Foreman High School	Mantino, Illinois
G	21	Steve Lanter	6 ft 4 in (1.93 m)	175 lb (79 kg)	RS So	Mascoutah Community High School	Belleville, Illinois
G	23	Larry Lubin	6 ft 0 in (1.83 m)	175 lb (79 kg)	Jr	New Trier High School	Glencoe, Illinois
F	24	Tom Gerhardt	6 ft 6 in (1.98 m)	210 lb (95 kg)	Sr	De La Salle High School	Chicago, Illinois
G	30	Rob Judson	6 ft 2 in (1.88 m)	170 lb (77 kg)	So	Zion-Benton High School	Zion, Illinois
F	31	Neil Bresnahan	6 ft 6 in (1.98 m)	200 lb (91 kg)	So	Fenwick High School	Oak Park, Illinois
F	32	Levi Cobb	6 ft 6 in (1.98 m)	205 lb (93 kg)	So	Morgan Park High School	Chicago, Illinois
F	33	Eddie Johnson	6 ft 7 in (2.01 m)	210 lb (95 kg)	Fr	Westinghouse High School	Chicago, Illinois
F	40	Rich Adams	6 ft 9 in (2.06 m)	205 lb (93 kg)	Sr	Colerain High School	Cincinnati, Ohio
G/F	41	Mike Jones	6 ft 4 in (1.93 m)	185 lb (84 kg)	Fr	Joliet Central High School	Joliet, Illinois
F	42	Mark Smith	6 ft 7 in (2.01 m)	195 lb (88 kg)	Fr	Richwoods High School	Peoria, Illinois
F	42	Rick Leighty	6 ft 7 in (2.01 m)	195 lb (88 kg)	Fr	Richwoods High School	Peoria, Illinois
G/F	43	Audie Matthews (C)	6 ft 5 in (1.96 m)	185 lb (84 kg)	Sr	Bloom High School	Chicago Heights, Illinois

Head coach

- Lou Henson (New Mexico State University) (3rd year)

Assistant coach(es)

- Tony Yates (University of Cincinnati) (4th year)
- Les Wothke (Greenville University) (3rd year)
- Mark Bial (University of Illinois) (1st year)

Legend

- (C) Team captain
- (S) Suspended
- (I) Ineligible
- (W) Walk-on
- Injured
- Current redshirt

Roster

== Schedule ==
Date time, TV	Rank^{#}	Opponent^{#}	Result	Record	Site (attendance) city, state
Non-Conference regular season
11/25/1977*		Charlotte	L 64–68	0–1	Assembly Hall (8,655); Champaign, IL
11/28/1977*		Arizona	W 113–107	1–1	Assembly Hall (7,356); Champaign, IL
12/1/1977*		Southern California	W 82–59	2–1	Assembly Hall (8,941); Champaign, IL
12/3/1977*		at South Carolina	W 84–68	3–1	Carolina Coliseum (9,116); Columbia, SC
12/6/1977*		Missouri; Show-Me Classic	W 96–85	4–1	Assembly Hall (6,010); Champaign, IL
12/16/1977*		BYU	W 81–74	5–1	Assembly Hall (8,612); Champaign, IL
12/28/1977*		vs. Washington State; Far West Classic	L 75–82	5–2	Veterans Memorial Coliseum (9,762); Portland, OR
12/29/1977*		at Oregon; Far West Classic	W 86–80	6–2	Veterans Memorial Coliseum (6,432); Portland, OR
12/30/1977*		vs. Washington; Far West Classic	L 68–81	6–3	Veterans Memorial Coliseum (6,542); Portland, OR
Big Ten regular season
1/5/1978		at Purdue	L 85–95	6–4 (0–1)	Mackey Arena (11,253); West Lafayette, IN
1/7/1978		at No. 11 Indiana; Rivalry	W 65–64	7–4 (1–1)	Assembly Hall (16,903); Bloomington, IN
1/12/1978		No. 12 Michigan State	L 70–82	7–5 (1–2)	Assembly Hall (10,300); Champaign, IL
1/14/1978		Michigan	W 65–61	8–5 (2–2)	Assembly Hall (8,795); Champaign, IL
1/19/1978		at Minnesota	L 66–70	8–6 (2–3)	Williams Arena (15,134); Minneapolis, MN
1/21/1978		Northwestern; Rivalry	W 73–64	9–6 (3–3)	Assembly Hall (9,616); Champaign, IL
1/26/1978		at Iowa; Rivalry	W 70–61	10–6 (4–3)	Iowa Field House (11,000); Iowa City, IA
1/30/1978		Ohio State	L 84–87	10–7 (4–4)	Assembly Hall (9,285); Champaign, IL
2/2/1978		Wisconsin	W 74–71	11–7 (5–4)	Assembly Hall (7,802); Champaign, IL
2/4/1978		at Ohio State	L 65–70	11–8 (5–5)	St. John Arena (13,489); Columbus, OH
2/9/1978		at Northwestern; Rivalry	L 61–72	11–9 (5–6)	McGaw Memorial Hall (3,268); Evanston, IL
2/11/1978		at Wisconsin	L 73–80	11–10 (5–7)	Wisconsin Field House (7,802); Madison, WI
2/16/1978		Minnesota	L 69–75	11–11 (5–8)	Assembly Hall (8,098); Champaign, IL
2/18/1978		Iowa; Rivalry	W 77–76	12–11 (6–8)	Assembly Hall (9,441); Champaign, IL
2/23/1978		at Michigan	L 96–107	12–12 (6–9)	Crisler Center (13,589); Ann Arbor, MI
2/25/1978		at No. 10 Michigan State	L 67–89	12–13 (6–10)	Jenison Fieldhouse (9,886); East Lansing, MI
3/2/1978		Indiana; Rivalry	L 68–77	12–14 (6–11)	Assembly Hall (7,222); Champaign, IL
3/2/1978		Purdue	W 67–66	13–14 (7–11)	Assembly Hall (11,938); Champaign, IL
*Non-conference game. ^{#}Rankings from AP Poll. (#) Tournament seedings in parentheses. All times are in Central Time.

== Player stats ==
Player	Games played	Minutes played	Field goals	Free throws	Rebounds	Assists	Blocks	Steals	Points
Audie Matthews	27	780	136	55	87	50	0	12	327
Mark Smith	27	680	111	90	163	36	7	37	312
Rich Adams	27	618	108	58	133	37	32	25	274
Eddie Johnson	27	469	100	20	84	16	8	11	220
Rob Judson	27	605	76	45	49	57	1	20	197
Neil Bresnahan	27	670	94	31	195	68	2	21	219
Reno Gray	20	434	90	6	29	66	1	18	186
Levi Cobb	27	610	72	28	131	23	10	17	172
Mike Jones	27	232	35	2	16	20	2	8	72
Ken Ferdinand	15	80	13	5	18	2	2	2	31
Larry Lubin	17	112	8	8	9	19	0	6	24
Tom Gerhardt	21	105	4	2	22	3	0	1	10
Matt Meyer	6	5	0	0	1	1	0	0	0

== Awards and honors ==
- Eddie Johnson
  - Fighting Illini All-Century team (2005)
- Audie Matthews
  - Team Most Valuable Player

== Team players drafted into the NBA ==
Player	NBA club	Round	Pick
Rich Adams	San Antonio Spurs	4	86
Audie Matthews	Detroit Pistons	6	117
