= 1977–78 Iowa Hawkeyes men's basketball team =

American college basketball season

1977–78 Iowa Hawkeyes men's basketball
- Conference: Big Ten Conference
- Record: 12–15 (5-13 Big Ten)
- Head coach: Lute Olson (4th season)
- Assistant coaches: Jim Rosborough; Tony McAndrews
- MVP: Ronnie Lester
- Home arena: Iowa Field House (Capacity: 13,365)

1977–78 Big Ten Conference men's basketball standings
	Conf.				Overall
Team	W		L	PCT	W		L	PCT
No. 4 Michigan State	15	–	3	.833	25	–	5	.833
No. 13 Indiana	12	–	6	.667	21	–	8	.724
Minnesota	12	–	6	.667	17	–	10	.630
Michigan	11	–	7	.611	16	–	11	.593
Purdue	11	–	7	.611	16	–	11	.593
Ohio State	9	–	9	.500	16	–	11	.593
Illinois	7	–	11	.389	13	–	14	.481
Iowa	5	–	13	.278	12	–	15	.444
Northwestern	4	–	14	.222	8	–	19	.296
Wisconsin	4	–	14	.222	8	–	19	.296
Rankings from AP Poll

The 1977–78 Iowa Hawkeyes men's basketball team represented the University of Iowa as members of the Big Ten Conference. The team was led by head coach Lute Olson, coaching in his 4th season at the school, and played their home games at the Iowa Field House. They finished the season 12–15 overall and 5–13 in Big Ten play.

== Roster ==
1977–78 Iowa Hawkeyes men's basketball team
Players
Coaches

Pos.	#	Name	Height	Weight	Year	Hometown
G	12	Ronnie Lester	6 ft 2 in (1.88 m)	—	So	Chicago, Illinois
G	20	Dick Peth	6 ft 2 in (1.88 m)	—	Jr	Tomah, Wisconsin
G	23	Kirk Speraw	6 ft 0 in (1.83 m)	—	Jr	Sioux City, Iowa
F	24	William Mayfield	6 ft 7 in (2.01 m)	205 lb (93 kg)	Jr	Detroit, Michigan
G	30	Kenny Arnold	6 ft 2 in (1.88 m)	—	Fr	Chicago, Illinois
F	32	Vince Brookins	6 ft 5 in (1.96 m)	—	Fr	Cleveland, Ohio
F	42	Mike Henry	6 ft 9 in (2.06 m)	—	Fr	Elgin, Illinois
F	44	Clay Hargrave	6 ft 4 in (1.93 m)	—	Jr	Iowa City, Iowa
C	52	Steve Waite	6 ft 10 in (2.08 m)	—	Fr	Iowa City, Iowa
C	54	Steve Krafcisin	6 ft 9 in (2.06 m)	—	Fr	Chicago, Illinois

Head coach

Lute Olson

Assistant coach(es)

- Jim Rosborough
- Tony McAndrews

Legend

- (C) Team captain
- (S) Suspended
- (I) Ineligible
- (W) Walk-on
- Injured
- Current redshirt

== Schedule/results ==
Date time, TV	Rank^{#}	Opponent^{#}	Result	Record	Site city, state
Non-conference regular season
11/26/1977*		at Iowa State; Rivalry	L 78-79	0-1	Hilton Coliseum; Ames, IA
11/28/1977*		at Kent State	W 82-64	1-1	Memorial Athletic and Convocation Center; Kent, OH
12/1/1977*		Mankato State	W 91-71	2-1	Iowa Field House (11,225); Iowa City, IA
12/3/1977*		Cal State Northridge	W 66-63	3-1	Iowa Field House; Iowa City, IA
12/10/1977*		at California	W 75-70	4-1	Harmon Gym; Berkeley, CA
12/17/1977*		Denver	W 107-65	5-1	Iowa Field House; Iowa City, IA
12/20/1977*		vs. Tennessee; Rebel Roundup	W 92-86	6-1	Las Vegas Convention Center; Las Vegas, NV
12/21/1977*		at No. 9 UNLV; Rebel Roundup	L 84-85	6-2	Las Vegas Convention Center; Las Vegas, NV
12/30/1977*		Drake	W 89-87	7-2	Iowa Field House; Iowa City, IA
Big Ten Conference Season
1/5/1978		at Indiana	L 51-69	7-3 (0-1)	Assembly Hall; Bloomington, IN
1/7/1978		at Ohio State	W 87-75	8-3 (1-1)	St. John Arena; Columbus, OH
1/12/1978		Michigan	L 56-66	8-4 (1-2)	Iowa Field House; Iowa City, IA
1/14/1978		Purdue	W 66-60	9-4 (2-2)	Iowa Field House; Iowa City, IA
1/19/1978		Northwestern	L 59-62	9-5 (2-3)	Welsh-Ryan Arena; Evanston, IL
1/21/1978		No. 10 Michigan State	L 58-68	9-6 (2-4)	Jenison Fieldhouse; East Lansing, MI
1/26/1978		Illinois	L 61-70	9-7 (2-5)	Iowa Field House; Iowa City, IA
1/30/1978		Wisconsin	W 88-73	10-7 (3-5)	Iowa Field House; Iowa City, IA
2/2/1978		Minnesota	L 71-82	10-8 (3-6)	Williams Arena; Minneapolis, MN
2/4/1978		Wisconsin	L 72-82	10-9 (3-7)	Wisconsin Field House; Madison, WI
2/9/1978		No. 10 Michigan State	L 70-71	10-10 (3-8)	Iowa Field House; Iowa City, IA
2/11/1978		Minnesota	L 65-78	10-11 (3-9)	Iowa Field House; Iowa City, IA
2/16/1978		Northwestern	W 76-74	11-11 (4-9)	Iowa Field House; Iowa City, IA
2/18/1978		Illinois	L 76-77	11-12 (4-10)	Assembly Hall; Champaign, IL
2/23/1978		at Purdue	L 69-82	11-13 (4-11)	Mackey Arena; West Lafayette, IN
2/25/1978		at Michigan	L 76-82	11-14 (4-12)	Crisler Arena; Ann Arbor, MI
3/2/1978		Ohio State	W 87-70	12-14 (5-12)	Iowa Field House; Iowa City, IA
3/4/1978		Indiana	L 55-71	12-15 (5-13)	Iowa Field House; Iowa City, IA
*Non-conference game. ^{#}Rankings from AP Poll. (#) Tournament seedings in parentheses.
