= 1977–78 Indiana Hoosiers men's basketball team =

American college basketball season

1977–78 Indiana Hoosiers men's basketball

NCAA Men's Division I Tournament, Sweet Sixteen
- Conference: Big Ten Conference

Ranking
- Coaches: No. 15
- AP: No. 13
- Record: 21–8 (12–6 Big Ten)
- Head coach: Bobby Knight (7th season)
- Assistant coach: Bob Donewald
- Captains: Wayne Radford; Jim Wisman
- Home arena: Assembly Hall

1977–78 Big Ten Conference men's basketball standings
| | Conf. | | | | Overall |
| Team | W | | L | PCT | W | | L | PCT |
|---|---|---|---|---|---|---|---|---|
| No. 4 Michigan State | 15 | – | 3 | .833 | 25 | – | 5 | .833 |
| No. 13 Indiana | 12 | – | 6 | .667 | 21 | – | 8 | .724 |
| Minnesota | 12 | – | 6 | .667 | 17 | – | 10 | .630 |
| Michigan | 11 | – | 7 | .611 | 16 | – | 11 | .593 |
| Purdue | 11 | – | 7 | .611 | 16 | – | 11 | .593 |
| Ohio State | 9 | – | 9 | .500 | 16 | – | 11 | .593 |
| Illinois | 7 | – | 11 | .389 | 13 | – | 14 | .481 |
| Iowa | 5 | – | 13 | .278 | 12 | – | 15 | .444 |
| Northwestern | 4 | – | 14 | .222 | 8 | – | 19 | .296 |
| Wisconsin | 4 | – | 14 | .222 | 8 | – | 19 | .296 |
Rankings from AP Poll

The 1977–78 Indiana Hoosiers men's basketball team represented Indiana University. Their head coach was Bobby Knight, who was in his 7th year. The team played its home games in Assembly Hall in Bloomington, Indiana, and was a member of the Big Ten Conference.

The Hoosiers finished the regular season with an overall record of 21–8 and a conference record of 12–6, finishing 2nd in the Big Ten Conference. After missing out on the NCAA Tournament in the previous season, Indiana was invited to participate in the 1978 NCAA Tournament, where Bobby Knight and the Hoosiers advanced to the Sweet Sixteen.

== Roster ==
| No. | Name | Position | Ht. | Year | Hometown |
|---|---|---|---|---|---|
| 20 | Bill Cunningham | G | 6–4 | So. | Phoenix, Illinois |
| 22 | Wayne Radford | G/F | 6–3 | Sr. | Indianapolis, Indiana |
| 23 | Jim Wisman | G | 6–2 | Sr. | Quincy, Illinois |
| 25 | Tommy Baker | G | 6–2 | Fr. | Jeffersonville, Indiana |
| 31 | Scott Eells | F | 6–9 | Jr. | Hoopeston, Illinois |
| 33 | Eric Kirchner | F | 6–7 | Fr. | Edelstein, Illinois |
| 34 | Steve Risley | F | 6–8 | Fr. | Indianapolis, Indiana |
| 40 | Glen Grunwald | F | 6–9 | So. | Franklin Park, Illinois |
| 41 | Butch Carter | G/F | 6–5 | So. | Middletown, Ohio |
| 42 | Mike Woodson | F | 6–5 | So. | Indianapolis, Indiana |
| 43 | Jim Roberson | C | 6–9 | Jr. | Rochester, New York |
| 44 | Phil Isenbarger | F | 6–8 | Fr. | Muncie, Indiana |
| 45 | Ray Tolbert | F/C | 6–9 | Fr. | Anderson, Indiana |

== Schedule/results ==
| Date time, TV | Rank^{#} | Opponent^{#} | Result | Record | Site city, state |
Regular season
| 11/26/1977* | | East Carolina | W 77–59 | 1–0 | Assembly Hall; Bloomington, Indiana |
| 12/5/1977* | | at No. 1 Kentucky; Indiana–Kentucky rivalry | L 64–78 | 1–1 | Rupp Arena; Lexington, Kentucky |
| 12/10/1977* | | Murray State | W 85–61 | 2–1 | Assembly Hall; Bloomington, Indiana |
| 12/14/1977* | | No. 2 Notre Dame | W 67–66 | 3–1 | Assembly Hall; Bloomington, Indiana |
| 12/17/1977* | | vs. SMU | W 56–51 | 4–1 | Market Square Arena; Indianapolis |
| 12/20/1977* | | Bowling Green State; Indiana Classic | W 89–52 | 5–1 | Assembly Hall; Bloomington, Indiana |
| 12/21/1977* | | No. 18 Alabama; Indiana Classic | W 66–57 | 6–1 | Assembly Hall; Bloomington, Indiana |
| 12/27/1977* | No. 15 | vs. Jacksonville; Gator Bowl Classic | W 69–59 | 7–1 | Gator Bowl Stadium; Jacksonville, Florida |
| 12/28/1977* | No. 15 | vs. Florida Gators; Gator Bowl Classic | W 73–60 | 8–1 | Gator Bowl Stadium; Jacksonville, Florida |
| 1/5/1978 | No. 11 | Iowa | W 69–51 | 9–1 (1–0) | Assembly Hall; Bloomington, Indiana |
| 1/7/1978 | No. 11 | Illinois; Rivalry | L 64–65 | 9–2 (1–1) | Assembly Hall; Bloomington, Indiana |
| 1/12/1978 | No. 18 | at Minnesota | L 62–75 | 9–3 (1–2) | Williams Arena; Minneapolis |
| 1/14/1978 | No. 18 | at Wisconsin | L 65–78 | 9–4 (1–3) | Wisconsin Field House; Madison, Wisconsin |
| 1/19/1978 | | Ohio State | W 77–63 | 10–4 (2–3) | Assembly Hall; Bloomington, Indiana |
| 1/21/1978 | | at Purdue; Rivalry | L 67–77 | 10–5 (2–4) | Mackey Arena; West Lafayette, Indiana |
| 1/26/1978 | | at Michigan | L 73–92 | 10–6 (2–5) | Crisler Arena; Ann Arbor, Michigan |
| 1/28/1978 | | No. 7 Michigan State | W 71–66 | 11–6 (3–5) | Assembly Hall; Bloomington, Indiana |
| 2/2/1978 | | at Northwestern | W 86–70 | 12–6 (4–5) | Welsh-Ryan Arena; Evanston, Illinois |
| 2/4/1978 | | at No. 7 Michigan State | L 59–68 | 12–7 (4–6) | Jenison Fieldhouse; East Lansing, Michigan |
| 2/9/1978 | | Purdue; Rivalry | W 65–64 | 13–7 (5–6) | Assembly Hall; Bloomington, Indiana |
| 2/11/1978 | | Northwestern | W 86–62 | 14–7 (6–6) | Assembly Hall; Bloomington, Indiana |
| 2/16/1978 | | at Ohio State | W 83–70 | 15–7 (7–6) | St. John Arena; Columbus, Ohio |
| 2/18/1978 | | Michigan | W 71–59 | 16–7 (8–6) | Assembly Hall; Bloomington, Indiana |
| 2/23/1978 | | Wisconsin | W 58–54 | 17–7 (9–6) | Assembly Hall; Bloomington, Indiana |
| 2/25/1978 | | No. 19 Minnesota | W 68–47 | 18–7 (10–6) | Assembly Hall; Bloomington, Indiana |
| 3/2/1978 | | at Illinois; Rivalry | W 77–68 | 19–7 (11–6) | Assembly Hall; Champaign, Illinois |
| 3/4/1978 | | at Iowa | W 71–55 | 20–7 (12–6) | Iowa Field House; Iowa, Iowa |
NCAA Tournament
| 3/12/1978* | No. (1) | vs. No. (3) Furman; Quarterfinals | W 63–62 | 21–7 (12–6) | Charlotte Coliseum; Charlotte, North Carolina |
| 3/17/1978* | No. 13 (1) | vs. No. (2) Villanova; Sweet Sixteen | L 60–61 | 21–8 (12–6) | Providence Civic Center; Providence, Rhode Island |
*Non-conference game. ^{#}Rankings from AP Poll. (#) Tournament seedings in parentheses.
