= 1977–78 Michigan State Spartans men's basketball team =

American college basketball season

1977–78 Michigan State Spartans men's basketball

Big Ten champions Old Dominion Classic champions

NCAA Tournament, Elite Eight
- Conference: Big Ten Conference

Ranking
- Coaches: No. 5
- AP: No. 4
- Record: 25–5 (15–3 Big Ten)
- Head coach: Jud Heathcote (2nd season)
- Assistant coaches: Bill Berry; Don Monson; Robert McGriff
- Captains: Robert Chapman; Greg Kelser
- Home arena: Jenison Fieldhouse

1977–78 Big Ten Conference men's basketball standings
	Conf.				Overall
Team	W		L	PCT	W		L	PCT
No. 4 Michigan State	15	–	3	.833	25	–	5	.833
No. 13 Indiana	12	–	6	.667	21	–	8	.724
Minnesota	12	–	6	.667	17	–	10	.630
Michigan	11	–	7	.611	16	–	11	.593
Purdue	11	–	7	.611	16	–	11	.593
Ohio State	9	–	9	.500	16	–	11	.593
Illinois	7	–	11	.389	13	–	14	.481
Iowa	5	–	13	.278	12	–	15	.444
Northwestern	4	–	14	.222	8	–	19	.296
Wisconsin	4	–	14	.222	8	–	19	.296
Rankings from AP Poll

The 1977–78 Michigan State Spartans men's basketball team represented Michigan State University in the 1977–78 NCAA Division I men's basketball season as members of the Big Ten Conference. They played their home games at Jenison Fieldhouse in East Lansing, Michigan and were coached by second-year head coach, Jud Heathcote. MSU finished the season 25–5, 15–3 in Big Ten play to win the Big Ten Championship. They received the conference's automatic bid to the NCAA Tournament where they defeated Providence and Western Kentucky before losing to Kentucky in the Mideast Regional Final. The team was led by freshman Earvin "Magic" Johnson and Gregory Kelser.

== Previous season ==
The Spartans finished the 1976–77 season with a record of 10–17, 7–11 to finish in fifth place in Big Ten play.

== Roster and stats ==
1977–78 Michigan State Spartans men's basketball team
No	Name	Pos	Year	Height	Pts	Reb	Ast
32	Gregory Kelser	F	JR	6–7	17.7	9.1	1.3
33	Earvin Johnson	F	FR	6–8	17.0	7.9	7.4
44	Robert Chapman	G	SR	6–2	12.3	2.7	2.0
31	Jay Vincent	C	FR	6–8	11.3	3.7	1.0
15	Ron Charles	F	SO	6–7	6.3	1.4	0.3
11	Terry Donnelly	G	SO	6–2	6.0	1.4	2.4
12	Mike Brkovich	G	FR	6–4	2.3	0.6	0.7
43	Sten Feidrech	C	FR	7–0	1.6	1.9	0.4
45	James Couture	C	SR	6–9	1.8	1.2	0.0
25	Alfred Brown	G	SR	6–6	1.4	1.0	0.3
24	Len Williams	G	SO	6–0	2.2	0.4	0.4
21	Donald Flowers	G	SR	6–2	1.0	0.1	0.0
41	Dan Riewald	G	SR	6–5	0.5	0.8	0.2
22	Nate Philips	G	SR	6–4	0.0	0.3	0.3
23	Mike Longaker	G	SO	6–1	0.0	0.0	0.0
42	Rick Kaye	G	FR	6–7	0.0	0.0	0.0

== Schedule and results ==
Date time, TV	Rank^{#}	Opponent^{#}	Result	Record	Site city, state
Non-conference regular season
Nov 28, 1977*		Central Michigan	W 68–61	1–0	Jenison Field House; East Lansing, MI
Dec. 2, 1977*		vs. Rhode Island; Carrier Classic	W 92–64	2–0	Manley Field House; Syracuse, NY
Dec 3, 1977*		at No. 12 Syracuse; Carrier Classic	L 67–75	2–1	Manley Field House; Syracuse, NY
Dec 8, 1977*		Wichita State	W 84–57	3–1	Jenison Field House; East Lansing, MI
Dec 10, 1977*		Western Michigan	W 79–57	4–1	Jenison Field House; East Lansing, MI
Dec 19, 1977*		Middle Tennessee	W 72–51	5–1	Jenison Field House; East Lansing, MI
Dec 21, 1977*		at No. 15 Detroit	W 103–74	6–1	Calihan Hall; Detroit, MI
Dec 29, 1977*		vs. SMU; Old Dominion Classic semifinal	W 95–69	7–1	Norfolk Scope; Norfolk, VA
Dec 30, 1977*		vs. New Hampshire; Old Dominion Classic championship	W 102–65	8–1	Norfolk Scope; Norfolk, VA
Big Ten regular season
Jan 5, 1978	No. 18	Minnesota	W 87–83	9–1 (1–0)	Jenison Field House; East Lansing, MI
Jan 7, 1978	No. 18	at Wisconsin	W 74–63	10–1 (2–0)	Jenison Field House; East Lansing, MI
Jan 12, 1978	No. 12	at Illinois	W 82–70	11–1 (3–0)	Assembly Hall; Champaign, IL
Jan 14, 1978	No. 12	Northwestern	W 67–63	12–1 (4–0)	Welsh-Ryan Arena; Evanston, IL
Jan 19, 1978	No. 10	Purdue	W 60–51	13–1 (5–0)	Jenison Field House; East Lansing, MI
Jan 21, 1978	No. 10	Iowa	W 68–58	14–1 (6–0)	Jenison Field House; East Lansing, MI
Jan 26, 1978	No. 7	at Ohio State	W 70–60	15–1 (7–0)	St. John Arena; Columbus, OH
Jan 28, 1978	No. 7	at Indiana	L 58–59	15–2 (7–1)	Assembly Hall; Bloomington, IN
Feb 2, 1979	No. 7	Michigan; Rivalry	L 63–65	15–3 (7–2)	Jenison Field House; East Lansing, MI
Feb 4, 1978	No. 10	Indiana	W 68–59	16–3 (8–2)	Jenison Field House; East Lansing, MI
Feb 9, 1978	No. 10	at Iowa	W 71–70	17–3 (9–2)	Iowa Field House; Iowa City, IA
Feb 11, 1978	No. 10	at Michigan; Rivalry	W 73–62	18–3 (10–2)	Crisler Arena; Ann Arbor, MI
Feb 16, 1978	No. 10	at Purdue	L 80–99	18–4 (10–3)	Mackey Arena; West Lafayette, IN
Feb 18, 1978	No. 10	Ohio State	W 66–56	19–4 (11–3)	Jenison Field House; East Lansing, MI
Feb 23, 1978	No. 10	Northwestern	W 66–56	20–4 (12–3)	Jenison Field House; East Lansing, MI
Feb 25, 1978	No. 10	Illinois	W 89–67	21–4 (13–3)	Jenison Field House; East Lansing, MI
Mar 2, 1978	No. 9	at Wisconsin	W 89–75	22–4 (14–3)	Wisconsin Field House; Madison, WI
Mar 4, 1978	No. 9	at Minnesota	W 71–70	23–4 (15–3)	Williams Arena; Minneapolis, MN
NCAA Tournament
Mar 11, 1978*	No. 6	vs. Providence; First Round	W 77–63	24–4	Market Square Arena; Indianapolis, IN
Mar 16, 1978*	No. 4	vs. Western Kentucky; Sweet Sixteen	W 90–69	25–4	University of Dayton Arena; Dayton, OH
Mar 18, 1978*	No. 4	vs. No. 1 Kentucky; Elite Eight	L 49–52	25–5	University of Dayton Arena; Dayton, OH
*Non-conference game. ^{#}Rankings from AP Poll. (#) Tournament seedings in parentheses. ME=MidEast Region. Source

== Awards and honors ==
- Earvin "Magic" Johnson – All-Big Ten First Team
