= 1977–78 Wisconsin Badgers men's basketball team =

American college basketball season

1977–78 Wisconsin Badgers men's basketball
- Conference: Big Ten Conference
- Record: 8–19 (6–12 Big Ten)
- Head coach: Bill Cofield (2nd season)
- Home arena: UW Fieldhouse

1977–78 Big Ten Conference men's basketball standings
	Conf.				Overall
Team	W		L	PCT	W		L	PCT
No. 4 Michigan State	15	–	3	.833	25	–	5	.833
No. 13 Indiana	12	–	6	.667	21	–	8	.724
Minnesota	12	–	6	.667	17	–	10	.630
Michigan	11	–	7	.611	16	–	11	.593
Purdue	11	–	7	.611	16	–	11	.593
Ohio State	9	–	9	.500	16	–	11	.593
Illinois	7	–	11	.389	13	–	14	.481
Iowa	5	–	13	.278	12	–	15	.444
Northwestern	4	–	14	.222	8	–	19	.296
Wisconsin	4	–	14	.222	8	–	19	.296
Rankings from AP Poll

The 1977–78 Wisconsin Badgers men's basketball team represented University of Wisconsin–Madison. The head coach was Bill Cofield, coaching his second season with the Badgers. The team played their home games at the UW Fieldhouse in Madison, Wisconsin and was a member of the Big Ten Conference.

== Roster ==
1977–78 Wisconsin Badgers men's basketball team
Players
Coaches

Pos.	#	Name	Height	Weight	Year	Hometown
C	00	Larry Petty	6 ft 9 in (2.06 m)	240 lb (109 kg)	Fr	New York, New York
G	10	Arnold Gaines	6 ft 4 in (1.93 m)	190 lb (86 kg)	So	Baltimore, Maryland
G	11	Wesley Matthews	6 ft 1 in (1.85 m)	165 lb (75 kg)	Fr	Bridgeport, Connecticut
G	12	Darnell Reid	6 ft 2 in (1.88 m)	165 lb (75 kg)	Fr	Bridgeport, Connecticut
G	13	James Smith (C)	6 ft 2 in (1.88 m)	170 lb (77 kg)	Sr	Wauwatosa, Wisconsin
G	15	Skip Jackson	6 ft 5 in (1.96 m)	185 lb (84 kg)	Fr	Long Island, New York
G	21	Dan Hastings	6 ft 4 in (1.93 m)	185 lb (84 kg)	Fr	Drexel Hill, Pennsylvania
F	22	James Gregory	6 ft 8 in (2.03 m)	190 lb (86 kg)	So	Washington, D.C.
G	32	Robert Jenkins	6 ft 3 in (1.91 m)	187 lb (85 kg)	So	Milwaukee, Wisconsin
G	33	Dean Anderson	6 ft 2 in (1.88 m)	175 lb (79 kg)	Sr	Madison, Wisconsin
F	35	Claude Gregory	6 ft 8 in (2.03 m)	205 lb (93 kg)	Fr	Washington, D.C.
C	40	Mark Newburg	6 ft 11 in (2.11 m)	218 lb (99 kg)	Jr	La Crosse, Wisconsin
F	45	Bill Pearson	6 ft 8 in (2.03 m)	218 lb (99 kg)	Sr	McFarland, Wisconsin
F	50	Joe Chrnelich	6 ft 7 in (2.01 m)	215 lb (98 kg)	So	Milwaukee, Wisconsin
C	53	Ray Sydnor	6 ft 7 in (2.01 m)	220 lb (100 kg)	So	Baltimore, Maryland

Head coach

- Bill Cofield (McKendree)

Assistant coach(es)

- Bo Ryan (Wilkes)
- Larry Reed (Milwaukee)
- Todd Landrum (Ohio Northern)

Legend

- (C) Team captain
- (S) Suspended
- (I) Ineligible
- (W) Walk-on
- Injured
- Current redshirt

== Schedule ==
Date time, TV	Rank^{#}	Opponent^{#}	Result	Record	Site city, state
Regular Season
12/1/1977*		UW—Milwaukee	W 72–66	1–0	UW Fieldhouse; Madison, WI
12/3/1977*		Canisius	W 96–70	2–0	UW Fieldhouse; Madison, WI
12/7/1977*		at George Washington	L 74–77	2–1	Charles E. Smith Center; Washington, DC
12/9/1977*		at No. 14 Providence	L 62–73	2–2	Providence Civic Center; Providence, RI
12/12/1977*		at Iowa State	L 73–82	2–3	Hilton Coliseum; Ames, IA
12/14/1977*		DePaul	L 62–85	2–4	UW Fieldhouse; Madison, WI
12/29/1977*		Loyola (IL)	W 71–70	3–4	UW Fieldhouse; Madison, WI
12/31/1977*		Northern Illinois	W 74–73 ^{OT}	4–4	UW Fieldhouse; Madison, WI
1/5/1978		at Ohio State	L 61–77	4–5 (0–1)	St. John Arena; Columbus, OH
1/7/1978		at No. 12 Michigan State	L 63–74	4–6 (0–2)	Jenison Fieldhouse; Lansing. MI
1/12/1978		Purdue	L 70–79	4–7 (0–3)	UW Fieldhouse; Madison, WI
1/14/1978		No. 18 Indiana	W 78–65	5–7 (1–3)	UW Fieldhouse; Madison, WI
1/19/1978		at Michigan	L 64–83	5–8 (1–4)	Crisler Arena; Ann Arbor, MI
1/21/1978		Minnesota	L 51–61	5–9 (1–5)	UW Fieldhouse; Madison, WI
1/28/1978		Northwestern	L 85–93	5–10 (1–6)	UW Fieldhouse; Madison, WI
1/30/1978		at Iowa	L 73–88	5–11 (1–7)	Carver–Hawkeye Arena; Iowa City, IA
2/2/1978		at Illinois	L 71–74	5–12 (1–8)	Assembly Hall (7,802); Champaign, IL
2/4/1978		Iowa	W 82–72	6–12 (2–8)	UW Fieldhouse; Madison, WI
2/9/1978		at Minnesota	L 55–64	6–13 (2–9)	Williams Arena; Minneapolis, MN
2/11/1978		Illinois	W 80–73	7–13 (3–9)	UW Fieldhouse (7,802); Madison, WI
2/14/1978*		at No. 1 Marquette	L 64–75	7–14	MECCA Arena (10,938); Milwaukee, WI
2/16/1978		Michigan	L 66–68	7–15 (3–10)	UW Fieldhouse; Madison, WI
2/18/1978		at Northwestern	W 81–80	8–15 (4–10)	McGaw Memorial Hall; Evanston, IL
2/23/1978		at Indiana	L 54–58	8–16 (4–11)	Assembly Hall; Bloomington, IN
2/25/1978		at Purdue	L 78–87	8–17 (4–12)	Mackey Arena; West Lafayette, IN
3/2/1978		No. 6 Michigan State	L 75–89	8–18 (4–13)	UW Fieldhouse; Madison, WI
3/4/1978		Ohio State	L 78–83	8–19 (4–14)	UW Fieldhouse; Madison, WI
*Non-conference game. ^{#}Rankings from AP Poll. (#) Tournament seedings in parentheses.
