= Lynn Hauldren =

American copywriter (1922–2011)

- Hauldren in character as the Empire Man in 1979
- Born: Elmer Lynn Hauldren; April 1, 1922; Missouri, U.S.
- Died: April 26, 2011 (aged 89); Evanston, Illinois, U.S.
- Occupation: Copywriter
- Known for: The "Empire Man"
- Spouse: Helen Helmke Hauldren
- Children: 6

Elmer Lynn Hauldren (April 1, 1922 – April 26, 2011) was an American advertising copywriter. He was best known for portraying the Empire Man.

== Early life and career ==
Hauldren was born Elmer Lynn Hauldren in Missouri on April 1, 1922, one of four children born to Elmer Lynn and Frances Mary Camilla (née Ryan) Hauldren. During World War II, he served as a radio operator in Asia along the Burma Road from India to China. While delivering supplies along the road, Hauldren's unit came under fire. When Hauldren visited the area in 2005, he was greeted as a hero by locals.

Following the war, Hauldren was a copywriter at Young & Rubicam, Bozell Jacobs and DDB Needham. He later founded his own firm, Lynn Hauldren Creative. During the course of his career in advertising, he won 2 Clio awards. Lynn Hauldren was married to Helen Helmke Hauldren and they had six children, 15 grandchildren, and 10 great-grandchildren. Three of his grandchildren are the tenor Matthew Polenzani, the singer-songwriter Rose Polenzani, and Robert Hauldren of Louis the Child (DJs).

In 1977, Hauldren was working on the Empire Carpet account and could not find an actor the company approved of for the role of The Empire Man in a commercial scheduled to be shot. Instead, then company owner Seymour Cohen asked Hauldren to play the role of The Empire Man himself. The Empire Man character appeared in most commercials for the company from 1977 to 2011. The company also issued a limited edition bobble-head doll of the character. By the 2000s, Empire switched from live-action commercials to CGI, with Hauldren continuing to provide voice-overs.

Hauldren also wrote the tune used to accompany the singing of the company's phone number, and recorded the jingle with an a cappella group, The Fabulous 40s. The famous Empire Today advertising jingle (eight hundred, five-eight-eight, two, three-hundred Empire!) has made the Empire Today phone number one of the most recognized numbers in the country.

Hauldren makes a cameo appearance in the 1992 film Wayne's World. At the start of the film, a character pauses on one of Hauldren's Empire commercials while channel surfing.

Hauldren recorded several albums with the barbershop quartet Chordiac Arrest including Live and Well and Second Opinion. The group also released a live performance video entitled Chordiac Arrest! The Video. In 2007 Hauldren formed a new vocal quartet called Chordplay that has appeared on television. In 2005, Hauldren appeared in a comedic short video for the stage show, Big Time Tonight, written by comedian Landon Kirksey and directed by Jeremy Dionisio. The video features Kirksey's character entering a bar and receiving sage-like advice from Hauldren himself. He was known to say of himself "I don't own the company, I can't install carpet, and I'm not an actor." When asked for autographs, he'd reply "I'm not an actor or a celebrity. I'm a pitchman; a glorified salesman."

== Death ==
Hauldren died on April 26, 2011, in Evanston, Illinois, at the age of 89.
