= Foreman College and Career Academy =

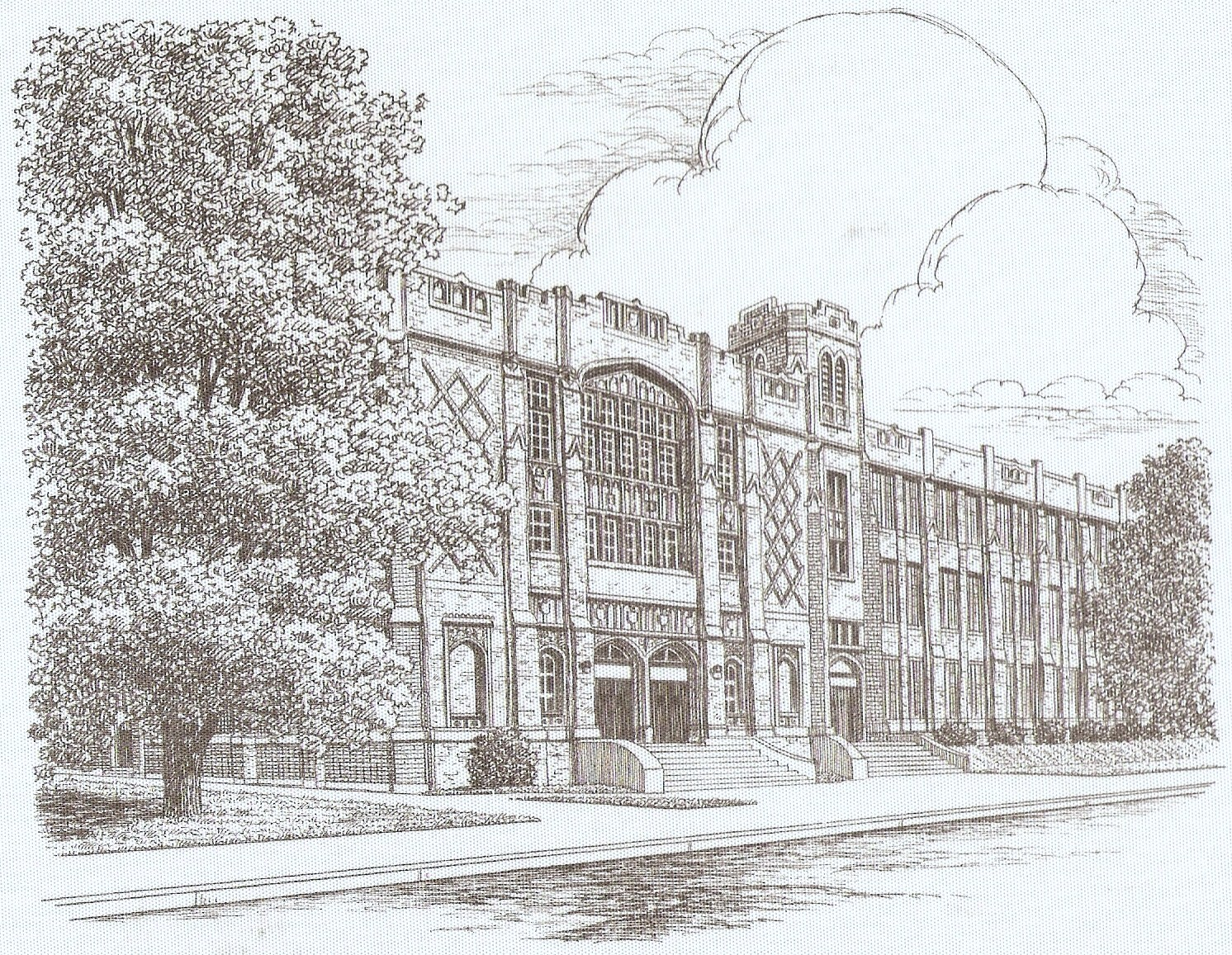
- Drawing of the main entrance to the school used in the diploma cover.

Location
- 3235 N. Leclaire Avenue; Chicago, Illinois 60641; United States; 41.9397°N 87.7540°W

Information
- Type: Public; Secondary
- Motto: "A brave man may fall, but cannot yield."
- Established: 1928
- Oversight: Chicago Public Schools
- CEEB code: 140795
- NCES School ID: 170993000799
- Principal: Anthony Escamilla
- Grades: 9–12
- Enrollment: 706 (2019–2020)
- Colors: Blue; Gold
- Athletics conference: Chicago Public League
- Mascot: Hornets
- Accreditation: North Central Association of Colleges and Schools
- Yearbook: The Foremanual
- Website: foremancca.org

Foreman College and Career Academy formerly, Foreman High School), is a public four-year high school located in the Portage Park neighborhood of Chicago, Illinois, United States. Foreman is operated by the Chicago Public Schools district. Established in 1928, the school is named in the honor of a Chicago banker and civic leader, Edwin G. Foreman, the uncle of 1920s thrill killer Nathan Leopold.

== Curriculum ==
=== Student services ===
Foreman High School provides several programs for students with limited English proficiency, including:

- Bilingual programs—Spanish and Polish
- Variety of English as a Second Language
- (ESL)/Bilingual courses
- Foreman offers honors, honors telescope and Advanced Placement (college level courses).
- Drama, music, studio art, teaching assistants, visually impaired programs and performing arts programs. Foreman has two three three honor societies: National Honors Sociery, Scoolastic Achievers and Foreman Leaders (all requiring a very high attainment of academic achievement).

=== Special education programs ===
Foreman provides Free Appropriate Public Education programs, including:

- Cooperative Team Teaching Program; Special Education
- Instructional Program; Support for Bilingual Special Education Students

== Athletics ==
Foreman's varsity athletic teams are named the Hornets and competes in the Chicago Public League (CPL) and is a member of the Illinois High School Association (IHSA). The boys' basketball team were regional champions two times (2009–2010 and 2016–2017). In 1999–2000, the boys' cross country were Class AA. The boys' soccer team were public league champions one time (1993–1994 and 1996–1997), regional champions three times (2002–2003, 2014–2015 and 2015–2016) and Class AA one time (2002–2003). The Foreman Hornets compete in a variety of fall, winter and spring interscholastic competitive sports administered by the Chicago Public High School League including;

- Fall sports: Cheer-leading (Girls), Cross Country (Boys/Girls), Football (Boys), Soccer (Boys), Volleyball (Girls)
- Winter sports: Basketball (Boys/Girls), Wrestling (Boys) Bowling (Boys/Girls), Cheer-leading (Girls), Swimming (Boys)
- Spring sports: Baseball (Boys), Soccer (Girls), Softball (Girls), Track (Boys/Girls), Volleyball (Boys), Water-polo (Boys/Girls)

== Clubs and activities ==
Foreman High School has a number of clubs and activities such as: Academic Decathlon, Aspira, Asian Club, Black Heritage Club, Chess Club, Computer Club, Debate Team, Drama Club, Future Teachers of America, Humanitarian Club, JROTC Drill Platoon, Literary Journal, Madrigal Singers, Math Club, National Honor Society, Mixed Chorus, Neuman Club, Newspaper, Peer Health Advocates, Photography Club, Polish Club, Readers To People With Visual Impairment, Running And Sprinting Team, Scholastic Achievers, Science Club, Science Fairs, Spanish Club. Student Council, Student Development Team, Teaching Assistant, and Yearbook.

== In media ==
Exterior shots of the school is used in the Disney Channel family sitcom Raven's Home.

== Notable people ==
The following are notable people associated with Foreman High School. If the person was a Foreman High School student, the number in parentheses indicates the year of graduation; if the person was a faculty or staff member, that person's title and years of association are included.

- Rod Blagojevich — (1974), politician; former Illinois governor
- Peter Francis Geraci — (1967), Chicago-based bankruptcy attorney
- Rebel Randall - (1936), actress
