= 1977–78 Michigan Wolverines men's basketball team =

American college basketball season

1977–78 Michigan Wolverines men's basketball
- Conference: Big Ten Conference
- Record: 16–11 (11–7 Big Ten)
- Head coach: Johnny Orr
- Assistant coaches: Bill Frieder; Jim Boyce
- MVP: Dion Harris

1977–78 Big Ten Conference men's basketball standings
	Conf.				Overall
Team	W		L	PCT	W		L	PCT
No. 4 Michigan State	15	–	3	.833	25	–	5	.833
No. 13 Indiana	12	–	6	.667	21	–	8	.724
Minnesota	12	–	6	.667	17	–	10	.630
Michigan	11	–	7	.611	16	–	11	.593
Purdue	11	–	7	.611	16	–	11	.593
Ohio State	9	–	9	.500	16	–	11	.593
Illinois	7	–	11	.389	13	–	14	.481
Iowa	5	–	13	.278	12	–	15	.444
Northwestern	4	–	14	.222	8	–	19	.296
Wisconsin	4	–	14	.222	8	–	19	.296
Rankings from AP Poll

The 1977–78 Michigan Wolverines men's basketball team represented the University of Michigan in intercollegiate college basketball during the 1977–78 season. The team played its home games in the Crisler Arena in Ann Arbor, Michigan, and was a member of the Big Ten Conference. Under the direction of head coach Johnny Orr, the team finished tied for fourth in the Big Ten Conference. The team failed to earn an invitation to either the 1978 National Invitation Tournament or the 1978 NCAA Men's Division I Basketball Tournament. The team was ranked in the Associated Press Top Twenty-Five Poll for four of the season's seventeen weeks, reaching a number 8 ranking on December 6, 1977, and falling out after the December 20, 1977, poll.

== Roster ==
1977–78 Michigan Wolverines men's basketball team
Players
Coaches

Pos.	#	Name	Height	Weight	Year	Hometown
F	53	Tom Bergen	6 ft 9 in (2.06 m)	200 lb (91 kg)	Sr	Mt. Prospect, Illinois
F	35	Phil Hubbard	6 ft 7 in (2.01 m)	202 lb (92 kg)	Jr	Canton, Ohio
F	40	Mike McGee	6 ft 6 in (1.98 m)	200 lb (91 kg)	Fr	Omaha, Nebraska

Head coach

- Johnny Orr

Assistant coach(es)

Legend

- (C) Team captain
- (S) Suspended
- (I) Ineligible
- (W) Walk-on
- Injured
- Current redshirt

== Rankings ==
Ranking movements Legend: ██ Increase in ranking ██ Decrease in ranking
	Week																
Poll	Pre	1	2	3	4	5	6	7	8	9	10	11	12	13	14	15	Final
AP Poll	13	13	9	15													

== Team players drafted into the NBA ==
Six players from this team were selected in the NBA draft. Hubbard accumulated no statistics.

Year	Round	Pick	Overall	Player	NBA Club
1978	3	17	61	Dave Baxter	Seattle SuperSonics
1978	4	3	69	Joel Thompson	Houston Rockets
1979	1	15	15	Phil Hubbard	Detroit Pistons
1981	1	19	19	Mike McGee	Los Angeles Lakers
1981	3	23	69	John Johnson	Boston Celtics
1981	5	20	112	Paul Heuerman	Phoenix Suns
