= Walter E. Smithe =

American furniture company

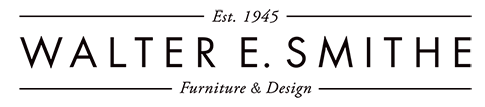
- Company type: Privately held company
- Industry: Furniture & Design
- Founded: 1945
- Headquarters: Itasca, Illinois
- Number of locations: 10 Locations
- Website: https://Smithe.com

Walter E. Smithe is a furniture company based in Itasca, Illinois. The company makes, sells, and repairs furniture, specializing in custom upholstery, and operates ten showrooms throughout the Chicago metropolitan area. It was founded by Walter Edward Smithe and Bill Shanahan in 1945. Walter Edward Smithe Jr. remained active with the company until his death in 2022.

== History ==
The company began in 1945 as Tone Appliances and Furniture, a single store on Belmont Avenue in Chicago. Walter E. Smithe and Bill Shanahan founded the store anticipating a booming economy in the wake of World War II. The two renamed the store Smithe and Shanahan, but Bill Shanahan eventually sold his share to Smithe's brother Charlie.

Walter E. Smithe, Jr. joined the business in the 1960s with his brothers Gary and Tomm, and began phasing out appliances to focus on custom upholstery. In the 1970’s Walter left Smithe and Shanahan (His brothers remained with the original company) to start his own company - Walter E. Smithe. His sons, Walter, Tim, and Mark, joined the company in the 1970s and 1980s. Today, the company has ten showrooms in Illinois and Indiana and one showroom in Naples, Florida, and is listed by Furniture Today as one of the top one hundred furniture retailers in the United States.

== Commercials ==
The company has become well known in the Chicago area for its television commercials, which for decades starred the three Smithe brothers, and now star the four Smithe sisters. The slogans "You dream it, we build it", or "That's Smithe, with an E" are commonly used.

== Family ==
In March 2017, daughters of Walter E. Smithe III became the fourth generation of the Smithe family to be featured in the commercials.
