= Peter Francis Geraci =

American lawyer

Peter Francis Geraci is a prominent Chicago-based bankruptcy attorney. He is a graduate of Foreman High School, DePaul University and DePaul University College of Law, and is a lifelong resident of Chicago. Geraci's great-grandfather, Francis A. Hoffmann, was corporation counsel for Chicago in the 1880s. His great-great grandfather, Francis A. Hoffmann, was a founder of the Republican Party, and lieutenant governor of Illinois during the Civil War, having been elected on Abraham Lincoln’s ticket in 1860.

== Practice ==
Peter Francis Geraci is admitted to practice law before the Supreme Courts of Illinois, Indiana, Wisconsin, New York, Florida, California and Michigan.

== Companies ==
Geraci is the founder of Geraci Law, L.L.C., the largest consumer bankruptcy firm in the country. Geraci Law, L.L.C. has about 80 attorneys practicing in Illinois, Indiana and Wisconsin, with over 30 locations. TV commercials for Geraci Law's bankruptcy services have become an example of urban culture associated with Chicago.

Peter Francis Geraci is the CEO of Professional Financial Guidance, L.L.C., an online provider of debtor education for consumer bankruptcy.

== Writing ==
Geraci authored the 1989 book The Bankruptcy Solution: The Insiders' Guide to Bankruptcy and How It Can Help You! He also offers a revised version of the book online for free.
