= Celozzi-Ettleson Chevrolet =

Chevrolet dealership in Illinois, United States

- Formerly: Zepalack Chevrolet
- Type: Private
- Industry: Automotive retail
- Predecessor: Zepalack Chevrolet
- Founded: February 1968
- Founders: Nick Celozzi; Maury Ettleson
- Defunct: October 2000
- Fate: Sold and renamed Elmhurst Chevrolet
- Successor: Elmhurst Chevrolet
- Headquarters: 155 E. Roosevelt Rd., Elmhurst, Illinois, U.S.
- Area served: Chicago metropolitan area
- Key people: Nick Celozzi; Maury Ettleson
- Products: Chevrolet automobiles
- Owners: Nick Celozzi; Maury Ettleson

Celozzi-Ettleson Chevrolet was a Chevrolet dealership located in Elmhurst, Illinois. Advertised as the "#1 Chevy dealer in the nation", it was owned by Nick Celozzi and Maury Ettleson and operated at the corner of York and Roosevelt roads from February 1968 to October 2000.

Well known for its local TV commercials featuring the owners displaying a large amount of cash in hand and advertising the dealership as the place "Where you always save more money," the dealership was originally Zepalack Chevrolet. Its actual address was 155 E. Roosevelt Road, although there was no direct access to the dealership from Roosevelt Road. At its peak, the dealership spent $1 million a year on television ads. Its commercials have been noted by the Chicago Tribune as memorable for all who grew up with them.

Celozzi and Ettleson also appeared in commercials for other products, including Bud Light and Pizza Hut, for which their tagline was revised to "Where you always get great pepperoni!"

Celozzi and Ettleson sold the dealership and parted ways in 2000. Gabor Bushy, who was the owner of Suburban Buick in nearby Wheaton, Illinois, purchased the dealership and renamed it Elmhurst Chevrolet. Several years later, the dealership relocated farther west on Roosevelt Road and became Villa Park Chevrolet (currently Castle Chevrolet of Villa Park). The building, advertised as "Hard to find, but tough to beat", has since been demolished. Elmhurst Memorial Healthcare built a major medical center on the site to replace the earlier Elmhurst Memorial Hospital. The site was annexed into Elmhurst, Illinois on March 3, 2008.

Ettleson later owned Ettleson Cadillac-Buick-GMC and Ettleson Hyundai in Hodgkins with his son Michael Ettleson. Celozzi owned Celozzi Ford and Celozzi Chrysler in Waukegan until 2003, when he was forced to declare bankruptcy and close the dealerships after one of his former business partners was indicted on fraud charges.

Maury Ettleson died on July 16, 2025.
