= Empire Today =

Home improvement company

Empire Today, LLC
- Formerly: Empire Plastic Covers (1959–1965); Empire Home Services (or just Empire) (1965–2003); Empire Carpets (1983–1984, 2001–2002 [on-website; empirecarpet.com (old website)])
- Type: Private
- Industry: Home Improvement
- Founded: 1959; 67 years ago
- Founder: Seymour Cohen
- Headquarters: 333 Northwest Avenue; Northlake, Illinois 60164; U.S.
- Area served: United States
- Products: Carpet; Hardwood Flooring; Laminate Flooring; Ceramic Flooring; Vinyl Flooring; Area Rugs
- Parent: H.I.G. Capital (2016–present)
- Website: empiretoday.com

Empire Today is an American home improvement and home furnishing company based in Chicago, Illinois, specializing in installed carpet and flooring. The company operates in more than 75 metropolitan areas within the United States, and is most well-known for TV ads featuring a distinctive jingle that recites the company's phone number and name. The company's name comes from the slogan on some of its commercials, "Empire today, carpet tomorrow". Empire Today claims that it is the largest in-home sales flooring company in the United States.

== History ==
Prior logo from 2004-2015

Empire Today LLC (commonly referred as Empire Today) was founded by entrepreneur Seymour Cohen in 1959. It was initially known as Empire Plastic Covers, a private, family-owned business in Chicago from a small office space. Cohen decided to expand the company's product line in response to growing customer request. In 1965, Empire Plastic Covers changed its name to Empire Home Services, adding carpet to their product line. Over the years, Empire's product line grew, as did the company's national presence. In December 2002, the company was sold, and then in January 2003, adopted its current name: Empire Today. It was acquired by the investment company Mercury Capital LP. In 2016, the company was sold to H.I.G. Capital, a private equity firm, for an undisclosed amount. In February 2022, Empire Today acquired Sitton Contract Flooring, a flooring based in California.

=== Carpet recycling ===
In 2023, Empire Today implemented a carpet and padding recycling program to minimize the environmental impact of their day-to-day operations. All of the padding removed by Empire Today's installers that can be recycled, will be recycled as part of their program in cooperation with Carpet America Effort (CARE) and Carpet Landfill Elimination and Recycling (CLEAR). In first quarter 2023, Empire piloted the program in select areas, and the program is currently operational in more than 25 of Empire's service areas. Since the program's inception, over eight million pounds of carpet and padding have been recycled, according to Empire's waste tonnage reporting.

== Advertisements ==
Empire Today's advertising is prevalent throughout major metro areas across North America. The company's television and web ads feature the "Empire Man" character. He was originally portrayed as live-action but is now portrayed as a cartoon character at the end of their advertisements.

=== Empire Man ===
Empire Man
- 1979 commercial featuring Empire Man
- First appearance: 1977
- Portrayed by: Lynn Hauldren (1977–2011)

In-universe information
- Species: Human
- Gender: Male
- Occupation: Carpenter

The "Empire Man" was introduced in 1977 as a live action character and later adapted into a popular animated person that has grown to become a cultural icon, especially in the Chicago area. The "Empire Man" has been seen internationally in commercials and other media, has spawned a line of collectible bobblehead dolls and inspired the Chicago Cubs to declare an official "Empire Day" at Wrigley Field in 2007.

The live action "Empire Man" was portrayed on television by Lynn Hauldren, a former ad executive, from 1977 through 2011. After Empire Today retired the live character in favor of an animated version, Hauldren continued to provide voiceovers for the ads until his death in April 26, 2011, though ads with his voiceovers continue to air on television. Since February 2017 the "Empire Man" has been portrayed by Ryan Salzwedel in various television spots.

=== Advertising jingle ===
Empire Today's advertising jingle, which has been broadcast since 1977, is a widely recognized theme. The jingle is simply a small vocal group singing out "800-5-8-8, 2-300" (the company phone number) and the company name. Over time, many different revisions to the song have been made, such as the word "today" being added in 2003, as well as the 800 part of the phone number also being added in 1995. Lynn Hauldren (also known as the Empire Man), a barbershop quartet performer, wrote and sang the tune to accompany the singing of the company's phone number, and recorded the jingle with an acappella group, the Fabulous 40s. The famous Empire Today advertising jingle has made the Empire Today phone number one of the most recognized numbers in the country.
