= Marquette Golden Eagles men's basketball statistical leaders =

The following lists give individual statistical leaders of the Marquette Golden Eagles men's basketball program in various categories, including points, rebounds, assists, steals, and blocks. Within those areas, the lists identify single-game, single-season, and career leaders. The Golden Eagles represent Marquette University in the NCAA's Big East Conference.

Marquette began competing in intercollegiate basketball in 1916. However, the school's record book does not generally list records from before the 1950s, as records from before this period are often incomplete and inconsistent. Since scoring was much lower in this era, and teams played much fewer games during a typical season, it is likely that few or no players from this era would appear on these lists anyway.

The NCAA did not officially record assists as a stat until the 1983–84 season, and blocks and steals until the 1985–86 season, but Marquette's record books includes players in these stats before these seasons. These lists are updated through the end of the 2020–21 season.

== Scoring ==
Career
Rk	Player	Points	Seasons
1	Markus Howard	2,761	2016-17 2017-18 2018-19 2019-20
2	Kam Jones	2,044	2021–22 2022–23 2023–24 2024–25
3	Jerel McNeal	1,985	2005-06 2006-07 2007-08 2008-09
4	Lazar Hayward	1,859	2006-07 2007-08 2008-09 2009-10
5	George Thompson	1,773	1966–67 1967–68 1968–69
6	Dominic James	1,749	2005-06 2006-07 2007-08 2008-09
7	Butch Lee	1,735	1974-75 1975-76 1976-77 1977-78
8	Travis Diener	1,691	2001-02 2002-03 2003-04 2004-05
9	Brian Wardle	1,690	1997-98 1998-99 1999-00 2000-01
10	Tony Smith	1,688	1986-87 1987-88 1988-89 1989-90

Season
Rk	Player	Points	Season
1	Markus Howard	851	2018-19
2	Markus Howard	806	2019-20
3	Andrew Rowsey	716	2017-18
4	Dwyane Wade	710	2002-03
5	Markus Howard	694	2017-18
6	Jerel McNeal	693	2008-09
7	Tony Smith	689	1989-90
8	George Thompson	664	1967-68
9	Kam Jones	653	2024–25
10	Wesley Matthews	640	2008-09

Single game
Rk	Player	Points	Season	Opponent
1	Markus Howard	53	2018-19	Creighton
2	Markus Howard	52	2017-18	Providence
3	Markus Howard	51	2019-20	USC
4	Tony Smith	44	1989-90	Wisconsin
	Mike Moran	44	1957-58	Creighton
6	Tony Smith	43	1989-90	Butler
	Terry Rand	43	1955-56	Duquesne
8	Markus Howard	42	2019-20	Georgetown
9	Steve Novak	41	2005-06	Connecticut
	George Thompson	41	1967-68	Xavier

== Rebounds ==
Career
Rk	Player	Rebounds	Seasons
1	Don Kojis	1,222	1958-59 1959-60 1960-61
2	Bo Ellis	1,085	1973-74 1974-75 1975-76 1976-77
3	Terry Rand	978	1953-54 1954-55 1955-56
4	Walt Mangham	938	1957-58 1958-59 1959-60
5	Lazar Hayward	910	2006-07 2007-08 2008-09 2009-10
6	Tom Flynn	771	1963-64 1964-65 1965-66
7	Paul Carbins	768	1964-65 1965-66 1966-67
8	Trevor Powell	765	1987-88 1988-89 1989-90 1990-91
9	John Glaser	753	1955-56 1956-57 1957-58
10	Russ Wittberger	745	1951-52 1952-53 1953-54 1954-55

Season
Rk	Player	Rebounds	Season
1	Don Kojis	462	1960-61
2	Terry Rand	396	1954-55
3	Don Kojis	384	1959-60
4	Don Kojis	376	1958-59
5	Walt Mangham	372	1958-59
6	John Glaser	349	1956-57
7	Walt Mangham	341	1959-60
8	Jim Chones	333	1970-71
9	Maurice Lucas	328	1973-74
10	Henry Ellenson	321	2015-16

Single game
Rk	Player	Rebounds	Season	Opponent
1	Pat Smith	28	1966-67	Loyola (Ill.)
2	Mike Moran	27	1956-57	Loyola (Ill.)
3	Don Kojis	26	1960-61	DePaul
	Don Kojis	26	1960-61	Creighton

== Assists ==
Career
Rk	Player	Assists	Seasons
1	Tony Miller	956	1991-92 1992-93 1993-94 1994-95
2	Tyler Kolek	697	2021–22 2022–23 2023–24
3	Dominic James	632	2005-06 2006-07 2007-08 2008-09
4	Travis Diener	617	2001-02 2002-03 2003-04 2004-05
5	Aaron Hutchins	550	1994-95 1995-96 1996-97 1997-98
6	Lloyd Walton	480	1973-74 1974-75 1975-76
7	Tony Smith	469	1986-87 1987-88 1988-89 1989-90
8	Jerel McNeal	455	2005-06 2006-07 2007-08 2008-09
9	Junior Cadougan	435	2009-10 2010-11 2011-12 2012-13
10	Cordell Henry	430	1998-99 1999-00 2000-01 2001-02

Season
Rk	Player	Assists	Season
1	Tony Miller	274	1993-94
2	Tyler Kolek	270	2022–23
3	Tony Miller	248	1994-95
4	Tyler Kolek	239	2023-24
5	Tony Miller	221	1991-92
6	Aaron Hutchins	215	1995-96
7	Tony Miller	213	1992-93
8	Sam Worthen	209	1978-79
9	Kam Jones	200	2024–25
10	Tyler Kolek	188	2021–22

Single game
Rk	Player	Assists	Season	Opponent
1	Tyler Kolek	18	2023-24	DePaul
2	Tony Miller	17	1994-95	Memphis
3	Glenn Rivers	16	1981-82	DePaul
4	Tony Miller	15	1994-95	Memphis
	Tony Miller	15	1993-94	Ohio State
	Tyler Kolek	15	2022–23	Georgetown

== Steals ==
Career
Rk	Player	Steals	Seasons
1	Jerel McNeal	287	2005-06 2006-07 2007-08 2008-09
2	Michael Wilson	272	1978-79 1979-90 1980-81 1981-82
3	Mandy Johnson	253	1981-82 1982-83 1983-84 1984-85
4	Dominic James	238	2005-06 2006-07 2007-08 2008-09
5	Stevie Mitchell	222	2021–22 2022–23 2023–24 2024–25
6	Chase Ross	214	2022–23 2023–24 2024–25 2025–26
7	Glenn Rivers	203	1980-81 1981-82 1982-83
8	Tony Smith	190	1986-87 1987-88 1988-89 1989-90
9	Michael Sims	188	1984-85 1985-86 1986-87 1987-88
10	Tony Miller	185	1991-92 1992-93 1993-94 1994-95

Season
Rk	Player	Steals	Season
1	Michael Wilson	89	1980-81
2	Jae Crowder	88	2011-12
3	Mandy Johnson	87	1984-85
4	Dwyane Wade	79	2001-02
5	Stevie Mitchell	78	2024–25
6	Glenn Rivers	77	1982-83
7	Jerel McNeal	76	2006-07
	Jerel McNeal	76	2007-08
9	Mandy Johnson	75	1983-84
10	Chase Ross	72	2025–26

Single game
Rk	Player	Steals	Season	Opponent
1	Michael Wilson	10	1980-81	Xavier
2	Earl Tatum	9	1974-75	St. Mary's (Calif.)

== Blocks ==
Career
Rk	Player	Blocks	Seasons
1	Jim McIlvaine	399	1990-91 1991-92 1992-93 1993-94
2	Theo John	191	2017-18 2018-19 2019-20 2020–21
3	Amal McCaskill	175	1991-92 1993-94 1994-95 1995-96
4	Faisal Abraham	172	1993-94 1994-95 1995-96 1996-97
5	Luke Fischer	153	2014-15 2015-16 2016-17
6	Chris Otule	145	2008-09 2009-10 2010-11 2011-12 2012-13 2013-14
7	Oso Ighodaro	130	2020–21 2021–22 2022–23 2023–24
8	Michael Wilson	119	1978-79 1979-90 1980-81 1981-82
9	Scott Merritt	113	2000-01 2001-02 2002-03 2003-04
10	Walter Downing	103	1984-85 1985-86

Season
Rk	Player	Blocks	Season
1	Jim McIlvaine	142	1993-94
2	Jim McIlvaine	92	1990-91
3	Jim McIlvaine	86	1991-92
4	Faisal Abraham	84	1996-97
5	Kur Kuath	81	2021-22
6	Jim McIlvaine	79	1992-93
7	Amal McCaskill	76	1994-95
8	Theo John	70	2018-19
9	Walter Downing	63	1984-85
10	Faisal Abraham	58	1995-96

Single game
Rk	Player	Blocks	Season	Opponent
1	Jim McIlvaine	13	1992-93	Northeastern Illinois
2	Theo John	8	2019-20	Loyola (MD)
	Amal McCaskill	8	1994-95	Virginia Tech
	Jim McIlvaine	8	1993-94	UW-Milwaukee
	Jim McIlvaine	8	1993-94	Cincinnati
	Jim McIlvaine	8	1993-94	Texas Southern
	Jim McIlvaine	8	1991-92	Saint Louis
	Jim McIlvaine	8	1990-91	Detroit
	Walter Downing	8	1985-86	North Carolina
