= Marquette Gymnasium =

Gymnasium in Milwaukee, Wisconsin

Coordinates: 43.036495°N 87.932426°W

- Interactive map of Marquette Gymnasium
- Location: 1530 W Clybourn St; Milwaukee, WI 53201
- Owner: Marquette University
- Operator: Marquette University
- Capacity: 1,500

Construction
- Opened: 1922

Tenant
- Marquette Golden Eagles

Marquette Gymnasium is a gymnasium on the campus of Marquette University in Milwaukee, Wisconsin, built in 1922. The building was the first full-time home of the Marquette men's basketball team before they moved, originally part-time, to the MECCA Arena. In later years, the building served as a practice facility for the team, as well as the home of the women's basketball and volleyball teams before the completion of the Al McGuire Center. Currently, the building houses offices for the Intercollegiate Athletics department (including the Cross Country, Track, soccer, tennis and golf teams) and the school's Army and Naval ROTC departments.

The building was traditionally known in the Marquette community as the "Old Gym." Marquette basketball coach Al McGuire and his Marquette men's basketball teams of the 1960s and 1970s (an era in which Marquette was a perennial NCAA tournament team and was often ranked in the top 10 of national polls) practiced almost exclusively in the Old Gym. Well known Marquette basketball players who played in the Old Gym home included George Thompson, Dean "The Dream" Meminger, Jim Chones, Bob Lackey, Maurice Lucas, Earl Tatum, Bo Ellis, Allie McGuire, Jerome Whitehead, Butch Lee, Sam Worthen, Doc Rivers, Tony Smith, Jim McIlvaine, Dwyane Wade and Travis Diener. Coaches include Tex Winter, Eddie Hickey, Al McGuire, Hank Raymonds, Rick Majerus, Kevin O'Neill, and Tom Crean.
