= Matt Bauscher =

American basketball player (born 1985)

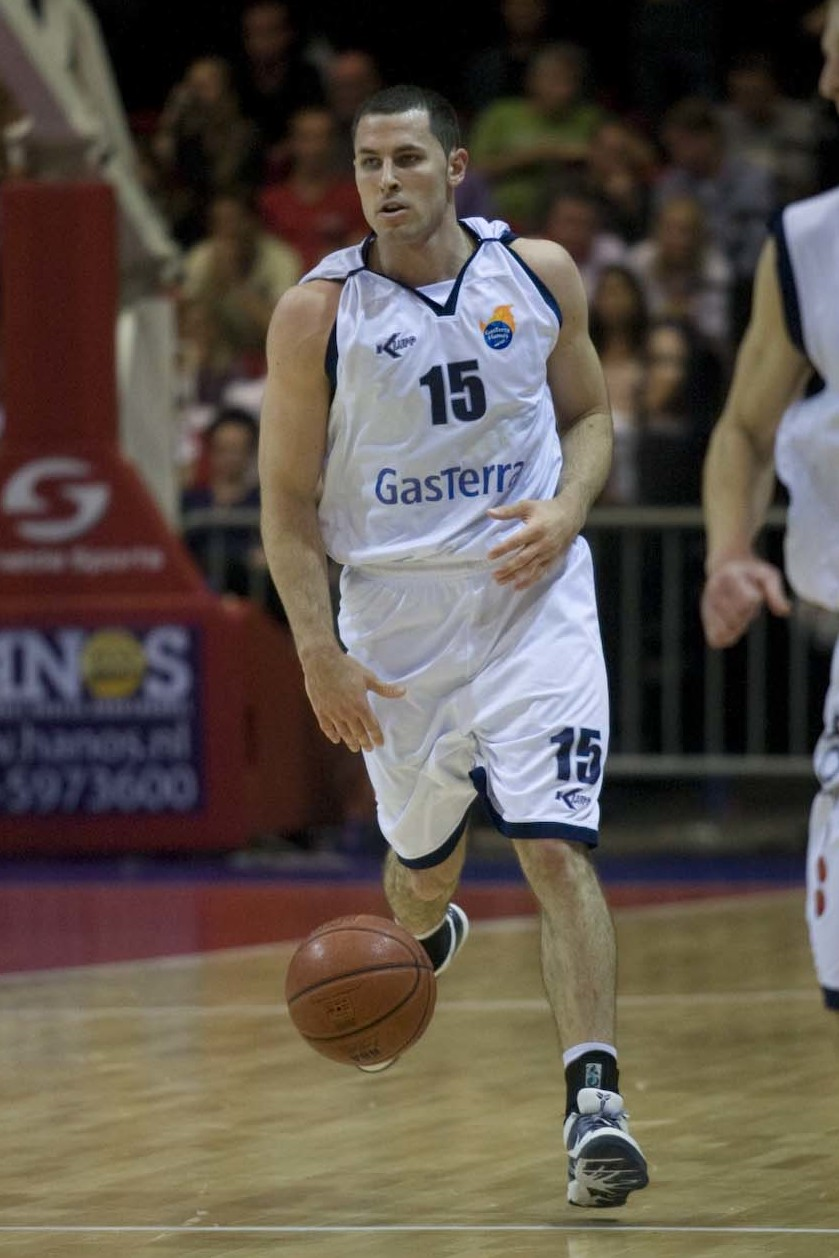
- Bauscher playing for GasTerra Flames in 2010

Personal information
- Born: April 25, 1985 (age 41) Caldwell, Idaho, U.S.
- Listed height: 6 ft 2 in (1.88 m)

Career information
- High school: Vallivue (Caldwell, Idaho)
- College: Spokane CC (2004–2005); Boise State (2005–2008)
- NBA draft: 2008: undrafted
- Playing career: 2008–2014
- Position: Shooting guard
- Number: 15

Career history
- 2008–2009: Aris Leeuwarden
- 2009–2011: GasTerra Flames
- 2011–2012: Göttingen
- 2012–2013: EiffelTowers Den Bosch
- 2013–2014: AEK Larnaca

Career highlights
- DBL champion (2010); 2× Dutch Cup champion (2011, 2013); 3× DBL All-Star (2009–2011); DBL All-Star Game MVP (2009); DBL scoring leader (2009); DBL assists leader (2009); DBL Statistical Player of the Year (2009)

Matthew Don Bauscher (born April 25, 1985) is an American former professional basketball player. Bauscher played three years for the Boise State Broncos, from 2005 till 2008, during his college career. He was the team captain at Boise State while winning the regular season and tournament championship. He earned All Conference Defense and All Conference Tournament Team. Afterwards he played six seasons as a professional player in Europe, spending most of his time in the Netherlands, in the Dutch Basketball League (DBL). Bauscher won the DBL championship in 2010. He also played in top divisions of Germany and Cyprus.

== Professional career ==
After playing three years for Boise State, Bauscher started his professional playing career in the Netherlands with Aris Leeuwarden in the Dutch Basketball League. He was the DBL Scoring champion during the 2008–09 season, as he averaged 22 points per game.

After his single season for Aris, Bauscher signed with GasTerra Flames of the DBL. In his first season with the Flames, he won the Dutch championship, and in his second season he won the NBB Cup.

In 2012, Bauscher signed with BG Göttingen in the Basketball Bundesliga (BBL) in Germany.

After one year in Germany, Bauscher returned to the Netherlands to play for EiffelTowers Den Bosch. With Den Bosch, he won the NBB Cup for the second time in his career.

In 2013, Bauscher signed with AEK Larnaca in Cyprus.

In August 2014, Bauscher retired from professional basketball. Matt Bauscher currently runs a real estate business in Boise, Idaho. He has sold over 100 homes every year since 2016 – becoming one of the top realtors in the United States. In 2020 alone, he sold 227 homes for $130,000,000 in sales.

== Honours ==
=== Club ===
GasTerra Flames

- Dutch Basketball League (1): 2009–10
- NBB Cup (1): 2010–11

EiffelTowers Den Bosch

- NBB Cup (1): 2012–13

=== Individual ===
- DBL scoring leader (1): 2008–09
- DBL assists leader (1): 2008–09
- DBL Statistical Player of the Year (1): 2008–09
- DBL All-Star Game MVP (1): 2009
- DBL All-Star (3): 2009, 2010, 2011
