= List of Dutch Basketball League season steals leaders =

The Dutch Basketball League's (DBL) steals title is awarded to the player with the highest steals per game average in a given regular season.

== Leaders ==
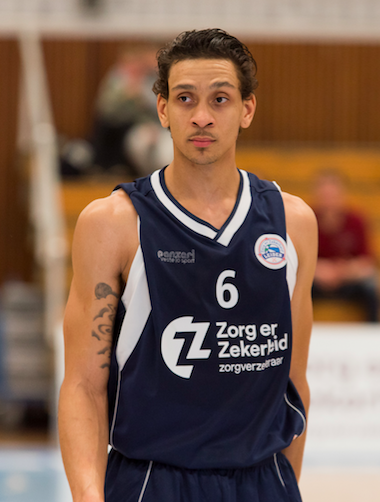
Worthy de Jong averaged the most steals in the 2015–16 season.

Key
Player (X)	Name of the player and number of times they had won the award at that point (if more than one)
Club (X)	Name of the club and the number of times a player of it has won the award (if more than one)

Season	Player	Position	Nationality	Team	Total	SPG
1985–86	Rod Drake		United States	Greyhounds Enschede	85	03.27
1986–87	Mario Bennes	F	Netherlands	BC Markt Utrecht	89	03.71
1987–88	Rob Jones		United States	Red Giants Meppel	101	02.81
1988–89	Raymond Bottse		Netherlands	EBBC Den Bosch	103	02.94
1989–90	Claude Williams		United States	BS Weert	132	03.86
1990–91	Claude Williams (2)		United States	BS Weert	108	03.72
1991–92	Unknown.					
1992–93	Tom Sewell	SG	United States	Donar	55	03.23
1993–94	Lorenzo Nash		United States	BC Zwijndrecht	39	03.90
1994–95	Izett Buchanan	G/F	United States	EBBC Den Bosch	41	03.72
1995–96	Joe Moore		United States	Rotterdam	114	03.93
1996–97	Mario Bennes (2)	F	Netherlands	Amsterdam Astronauts	51	03.18
1997–98	Tony Miller		United States	Den Helder	51	03.34
1998–99	Ralph Biggs	G	Belgium	BS Weert	141	03.91
1999–2000	Joe Spinks	SF	United States	Amsterdam Astronauts	130	04.06
2000–01	Joe Spinks (2)	SF	United States	Amsterdam Astronauts	131	04.36
2001–02	Darrel Lewis	G/F	Iceland (Note: Born in the United States, Lewis became a naturalised Icelandic citizen.)	NTNT Haaglanden Den Haag	114	04.22
2002–03	Warren Peebles	G	United States	Donar	100	03.70
2003–04	Joe Spinks (3)	SF	United States	Amsterdam Astronauts	161	04.73
2004–05	Joe Spinks (4)	SF	United States	Amsterdam Astronauts	96	03.42
2005–06	Anthony Dill	SF	United States	Rotterdam	78	3.4
2006–07	Ryan Sears	PG	United States	Matrixx Magixx	122	3.1
2007–08	Guido Grünheid	PF	Germany	Hanzevast Capitals	104	3.1
2008–09	Ryan Sears (2)	PG	United States	Matrixx Magixx (2)	122	3.1
2009–10	Torey Thomas	PG	United States	Matrixx Magixx (3)	86	2.9
2010–11	Frank Turner	PG	United States	EiffelTowers Den Bosch	87	2.4
2011–12	David Gonzalvez	SG	United States	EiffelTowers Den Bosch (2)	71	2.5
2012–13	Josh Magette	PG	United States	Landstede Zwolle	92	2.6
2013–14	Darius Theus	PG	United States	Aris Leeuwarden	111	3.1
2014–15	J. T. Tiller	PG	United States	Landstede Zwolle (2)	71	2.7
2015–16	Worthy de Jong	SG	Netherlands	ZZ Leiden	78	2.8
2016–17	J. T. Tiller (2)	SG	United States	Landstede Zwolle (3)	58	2.4
2017–18	Worthy de Jong (2)	SG	Netherlands	ZZ Leiden (2)	96	3.0
2018–19	Kaza Kajami-Keane	SG	Canada	Landstede Zwolle (4)	97	2.9
2019–20 (Note: The 2019–20 season was cancelled prematurely due to the COVID-19 pandemic.)	Worthy de Jong (3)	SG	Netherlands	ZZ Leiden (3)	44	2.4
2020–21	Bolden Brace	SF	Netherlands	Den Helder Suns	50	2.4
2021–22 (Note: Since the 2021–22 season, the DBL was re-placed by the BNXT League. The season scoring leaders are the players from Dutch clubs with the highest point average in the domestic phase (excluding playoffs).)	Justin Mitchell	SG	United States	Apollo Amsterdam	23	2.3
2022–23	Sam Van Oostrumm	SG	Netherlands	Den Helder Suns		2.9
