= List of Dutch Basketball League season assists leaders =

In basketball, an assist is a pass to a teammate that directly leads to a score by field goal. The Dutch Basketball League's (DBL) assist title is awarded to the player with the highest assists per game average in a given regular season. The assists title was first recognized in the 1985–1986 season when statistics on assists were first compiled.

== Leaders ==
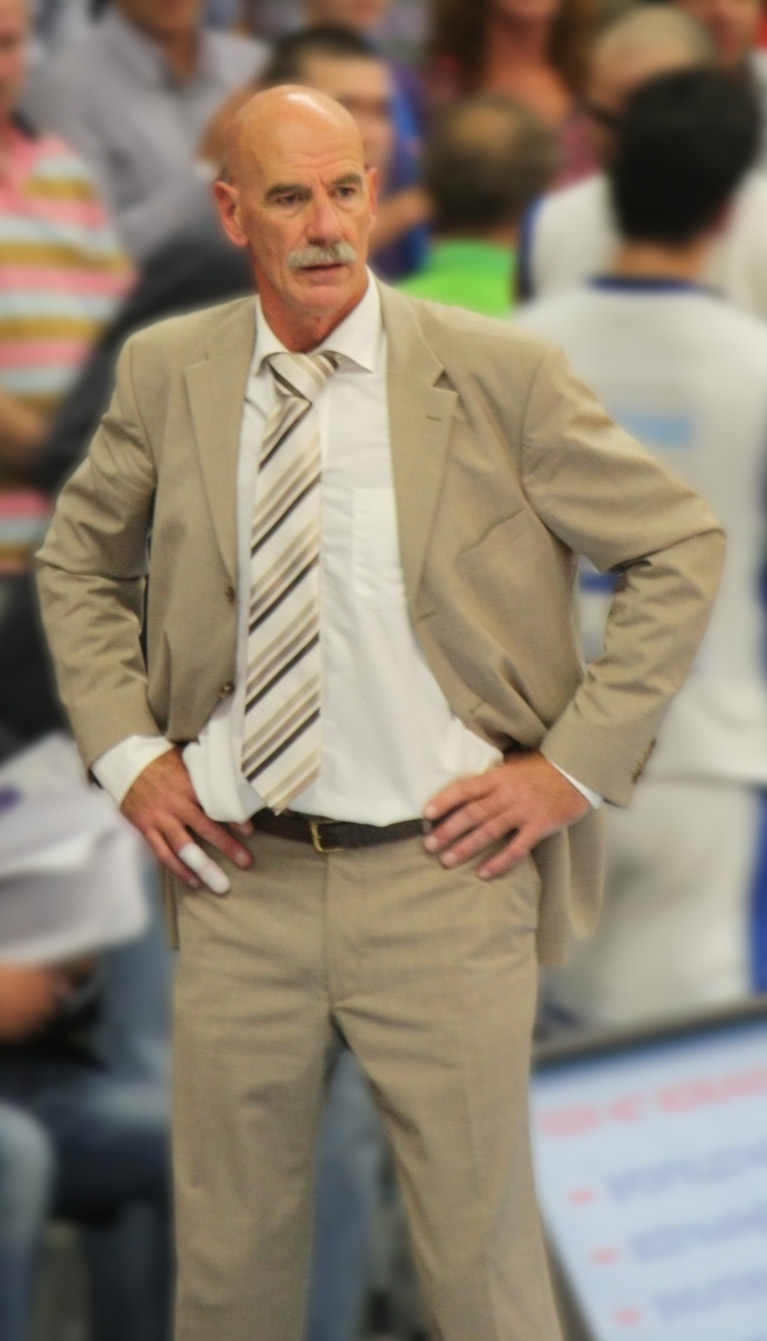
Toon van Helfteren averaged the most assists in 1987.

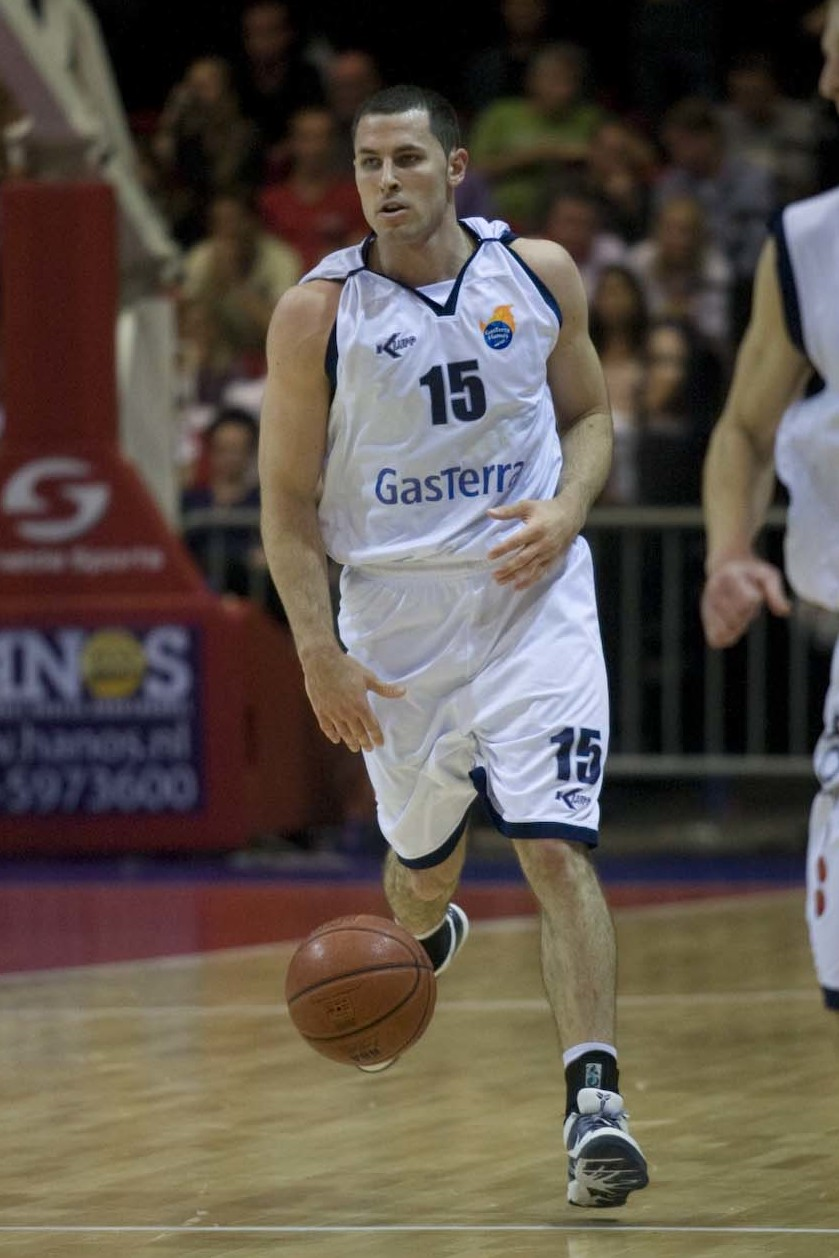
Matt Bauscher was the DBL assists leader in 2009.

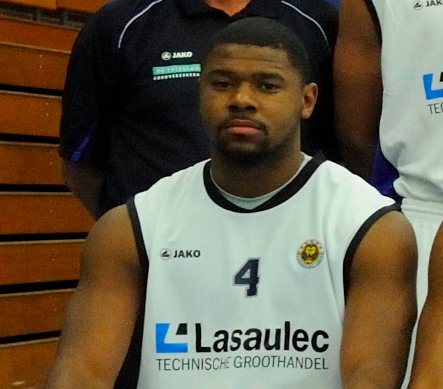
Lance Jeter led the league in assist twice, in 2015 and 2017.

Key
Player (X)	Name of the player and number of times they had won the award at that point (if more than one)
Club (X)	Name of the club and the number of times a player of it has won the award (if more than one)
^	Denotes player who is still active in the DBL
APG	Assists per game

Season	Player	Nationality	Club	Total	APG	Ref
1985–86	Marco de Waard	Netherlands	Den Helder	195	7.8	
1986–87	Toon van Helfteren	Netherlands	DAS Delft	275	8.1	
1987–88	Jeroen Talens	Netherlands	Red Giants Meppel	284	8.4	
1988–89	Terry Coner	United States	DAS Delft	288	8.2	
1989–90	John Emanuels	United States	DAS Delft	352	9.8	
1990–91	Maury Selvin	United States	Donar	218	6.8	
1991–92	Cees van Rootselaar	Netherlands	Den Helder	192	10.1	
1992–93	Cees van Rootselaar (2)	Netherlands	Den Helder	159	8.8	
1993–94	Cees van Rootselaar (3)	Netherlands	Den Helder	242	9.0	
1994–95	Cees van Rootselaar (4)	Netherlands	Den Helder	270	10.0	
1995–96	Cees van Rootselaar (5)	Netherlands	Den Helder	166	8.3	
1996–97	Tony Miller	United States	Den Helder	234	8.1	
1997–98	Tony Miller (2)	United States	Den Helder	189	7.0	
1998–99	Albert Johnson	United States	Donar	324	10.1	
1999–00	Ed Norvell	United States	Virtus	264	8.3	
2000–01	Ed Norvell (2)	United States	Den Bosch	264	9.1	
2001–02	Scott Ungerer	United States	Landstede Zwolle	216	7.7	
2002–03	Gregory Harris	United States	BSW Weert	298	7.1	
2003–04	Gregory Harris (2)	United States	BSW Weert	205	7.3	
2004–05	Tony Miller (3)	United States	Omniworld Almere	192	7.4	
2005–06	Taron Downey	United States	BSW Weert	316	7.9	
2007–08	Jesse Kimbrough	United States	Aris Leeuwarden	275	6.9	
2009–09	Matt Bauscher	United States	Aris Leeuwarden	223	5.9	
2009–10	Torey Thomas	United States	Matrixx Magixx	217	7.2	
2010–11	Frank Turner	United States	EiffelTowers Den Bosch	190	5.3	
2011–12	Frank Turner (2)	United States	EiffelTowers Den Bosch	137	5.1	
2012–13	Whit Holcomb-Faye	United States	Aris Leeuwarden	280	7.8	
2013–14	Emmanuel Ubilla	Puerto Rico	Den Helder Kings	202	5.6	
2014–15	Lance Jeter	United States	Donar	124	5.0	
2015–16	Nigel Van Oostrum^	United Kingdom	Aris Leeuwarden	228	8.2	
2016–17	Lance Jeter (2)	United States	Donar	174	6.2	
2017–18	Carrington Love	United States	ZZ Leiden	216	6.8	
2018–19	Maurice Watson, Jr.	United States	ZZ Leiden	260	7.9	
2019–20 (Note: The 2019–20 season was cancelled prematurely due to the COVID-19 pandemic.)	Tayler Persons	United States	ZZ Leiden	135	7.5	
2020–21	Austin Luke^	United States	Yoast United	212	9.6	

=== BNXT League Domestic Phase leaders ===
Since the 2021–22 season, the Dutch Basketball League has merged with the Belgian League to create the BNXT League. The following were the leads in the Dutch phase of the regular season.

Season	Player	Nationality	Club	APG	Ref
2021–22					
2022–23	Mike Schilder	Netherlands	Yoast United	6.5	
