= Symir Torrence =

American basketball player (born 2001)

No. 10 – Kortrijk Spurs
- Position: Point guard
- League: BNXT League

Personal information
- Born: June 2, 2001 (age 25) Syracuse, New York, U.S.
- Listed height: 6 ft 3 in (1.91 m)
- Listed weight: 194 lb (88 kg)

Career information
- High school: Vermont Academy (Saxtons River, Vermont)
- College: Marquette (2019–2021); Syracuse (2021–2023); Binghamton (2023–2024)
- NBA draft: 2024: undrafted
- Playing career: 2024–present

Career history
- 2024–2025: Bisons Loimaa
- 2025: Antwerp Giants
- 2025–2026: Motor City Cruise
- 2026–present: Kortrijk Spurs

Symir Torrence (born June 2, 2001) is an American professional basketball player for Kortrijk Spurs of the BNXT League.

== Professional career ==
On August 2, 2024, Torrence signed his first professional contract with Bisons Loimaa in Finnish Korisliiga.

On March 5, 2025, he joined the Antwerp Giants of the BNXT League.

On November 7, 2025, he joined the Motor City Cruise of the NBA G League.

On July 20, 2026, he signed with Kortrijk Spurs of the BNXT League.
