= Danny Gibson =

American basketball player (born 1984)

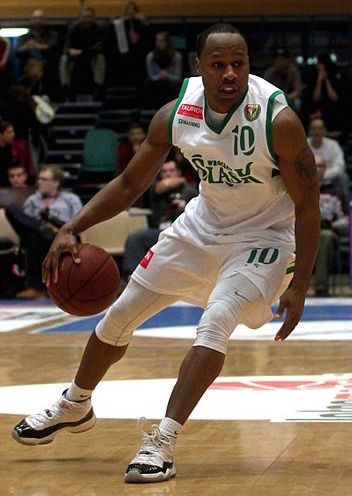
- Gibson playing for Śląsk Wrocław

Free Agent
- Position: Point guard

Personal information
- Born: January 28, 1984 (age 42) Madison, Indiana, U.S.
- Listed height: 5 ft 10 in (1.78 m)
- Listed weight: 175 lb (79 kg)

Career information
- High school: Madison (Madison, Indiana)
- College: Olney CC (2002–2004); Southern Indiana (2004–2006)
- NBA draft: 2006: undrafted
- Playing career: 2006–present

Career history
- 2006–2007: NVV Lions Mönchengladbach
- 2007–2008: Cuxhaven BasCats
- 2008–2009: Giants Nördlingen
- 2009–2010: ZZ Leiden
- 2010–2012: Bayreuth
- 2012–2013: Ikaros Kallitheas
- 2013–2014: Śląsk Wrocław
- 2014–2015: Rosa Radom
- 2015–2016: Twarde Pierniki Torún
- 2016–2017: Lukoil Academic
- 2017–2018: Limoges CSP
- 2018–2019: Büyükçekmece
- 2019–2020: Śląsk Wrocław

Career highlights
- Bulgarian League Finals MVP (2017); Bulgarian League champion (2017); All-PLK Team (2016); Polish Cup champion (2014); Dutch Cup champion (2010); DBL Most Valuable Player (2010); All-DBL Team (2010); DBL All-Star (2010)

Danny Gibson (born January 28, 1984) is an American professional basketball player, who lastly played for Śląsk Wrocław of the PLK. Gibson plays the point guard or shooting guard and has played in multiple leagues in Europe.

== Professional career ==
On October 17, 2013, Gibson signed with Śląsk Wrocław of the Polish Basketball League. He won the Polish Basketball Cup with Śląsk Wrocław.

On July 14, 2014, Gibson signed with Rosa Radom of the Polish Basketball League.

On August 11, 2015, Gibson signed with Pierniki Toruń of the Polish Basketball League.

On October 29, 2019, he has signed with Śląsk Wrocław of the PLK.

== Honours ==
=== Club ===
Śląsk Wrocław

- Polish Basketball Cup: 2014

ZZ Leiden

- NBB Cup: 2010

=== Individual ===
- DBL Most Valuable Player (1): 2009–10
- All-DBL Team (1): 2009–10
- DBL All-Star (1): 2010
- All-PLK Team (1): 2015–16
