= Marquette Golden Eagles men's basketball =

College sports team in Milwaukee, USA

2026–27 Marquette Golden Eagles men's basketball team
- University: Marquette University
- First season: 1916–17; 110 years ago
- Athletic director: Bill Scholl
- Head coach: Shaka Smart; 6th season, 110–60 (.647)
- Location: Milwaukee, Wisconsin
- Arena: Fiserv Forum (capacity: 18,412)
- NCAA division: Division I
- Conference: Big East
- Nickname: Golden Eagles
- Colors: Blue and gold
- All-time record: 1774–1093 (.619)
- NCAA tournament record: 44–38 (.537)

NCAA Division I tournament champions
- 1977
Other NCAA Division I tournament results
Runner-up	1974
Final Four	1974, 1977, 2003
Elite Eight	1955, 1969, 1974, 1976, 1977, 2003, 2013
Sweet Sixteen	1955, 1959, 1968, 1969, 1971, 1972, 1973, 1974, 1976, 1977, 1979, 1994, 2003, 2011, 2012, 2013, 2024
Appearances	1955, 1959, 1961, 1968, 1969, 1971, 1972, 1973, 1974, 1975, 1976, 1977, 1978, 1979, 1980, 1982, 1983, 1993, 1994, 1996, 1997, 2002, 2003, 2006, 2007, 2008, 2009, 2010, 2011, 2012, 2013, 2017, 2019, 2022, 2023, 2024, 2025

NIT champions
- 1970

Conference tournament champions
- C-USA: 1997 Big East: 2023

Conference regular-season champions
- GMC: 1994 C-USA: 2003 Big East: 2013, 2023

Uniforms
Home	Away	Alternate

The Marquette Golden Eagles men's basketball team (formerly the Marquette Hilltoppers and Marquette Warriors) represents Marquette University in NCAA Division I college basketball and competes in the Big East Conference. The team plays its home games at Fiserv Forum in downtown Milwaukee (also the home of the NBA's Milwaukee Bucks).

Marquette has made 37 NCAA tournament appearances, most recently in 2025. The Golden Eagles appeared in the Final Four in 1974, 1977, and 2003, were the national runner-up in 1974, and have won one national championship, in 1977. Marquette initially joined a conference in 1989, winning five conference regular season championships and two conference tournament championships.

The Golden Eagles have had three national coaches of the year, four conference coaches of the year, one national player of the year, 10 consensus all-americans, four conference players of the year, and 16 all-conference first team selections. Marquette has had three Naismith Memorial Basketball Hall of Fame and four National Collegiate Basketball Hall of Fame inductees. Additionally, 39 Marquette players have gone on to play in the NBA, combining for seven NBA championships, 25 NBA all-star selections, and 11 all-NBA selections.

== History ==
=== McGuire era ===
Al McGuire became the head coach in 1964 and brought the program to national prominence, earning an NIT Championship in 1970 and a Final Four appearance in 1974 against the North Carolina State Wolfpack, where he became the first coach ejected from a championship game. McGuire coached with assistants Hank Raymonds and Rick Majerus, who each had their own stints as head of the program following his departure. In his final season as a collegiate head coach, McGuire led Marquette to its only NCAA basketball championship in 1977. Led by Alfred "Butch" Lee, Maurice "Bo" Ellis and Jerome Whitehead, the team beat UNC Charlotte in the national semifinals after Whitehead received a full-court pass and subsequently made a last-second shot. Two days later, Marquette defeated Dean Smith's North Carolina Tar Heels for the title. The team set a record with seven losses going into the NCAA tournament, the most losses up to that time for a team that would win the NCAA Championship.

=== Crean era ===
Tom Crean took over the program on March 30, 1999. According to Crean, "Once Marquette became available, that's where my sights were. I had unbelievable respect for the tradition and the name. When I thought of Marquette, I thought of a true basketball school and to me that had a lot to do with it." Crean immediately made a number of changes at Marquette, creating a new team image by increasing the significance of the team's media day and instituting a "Midnight Madness" event commonly held by schools on the night teams are allowed to begin practice. Crean's first recruiting class was considered by experts to be among the top twenty in the country, Marquette's first in a long time.

In his nine years with Marquette, Crean's teams earned five NCAA tournament bids, one more than the previous four Marquette coaches had in the 16 years prior to his arrival. During his tenure there Crean recruited, developed and coached a number of skilled players that made significant contributions in both the NCAA and NBA, including Dwyane Wade, Dominic James, Steve Novak, Wesley Matthews, and Travis Diener.

Over his final seven seasons at Marquette, Crean compiled an aggregate record of 160–68 (.702). The 2002–03 season was one of the best in Marquette history. The team made a Final Four appearance for the first time since winning the NCAA Championship in 1977. Crean has referred to the team's run as "one of the greatest four or five days of my life."

Later that year, Marquette accepted an offer to leave Conference USA for the Big East Conference after the 2004–2005 season. Big East commissioner Mike Tranghese cited his friendship with Crean as contributing to the invitation, saying, "That, to me, was one of the great appeals, to get Tommy as well as Marquette into the league."

When Crean was asked why he left Marquette, Crean replied, "It's Indiana. It's Indiana, and that is the bottom line."

=== Williams era ===
After Crean departed for the head job at Indiana, Buzz Williams was hired as the new head coach for the 2008–09 season, leading Marquette to a 25–10 record in and a second round loss to the Missouri Tigers in the 2009 NCAA tournament. He coached Marquette to a 22–12 record in the 2009–10 season, which ended with a close loss to the 11th-seeded Washington Huskies in the First Round of the 2010 NCAA tournament.

During the 2010–11 campaign, Williams led the Golden Eagles back to the Sweet Sixteen for the first time since 2003. His team went 22–15 including a 9–9 Big East Conference record. They lost in the quarterfinals of the 2011 Big East men's basketball tournament to Louisville. Marquette received an at-large bid to the 2011 NCAA tournament. There, they defeated Xavier in the second round (formerly the First Round) and Syracuse in the Third Round to advance to the Sweet Sixteen. In the Sweet Sixteen, they were defeated by No. 7-ranked and No. 2-seeded North Carolina.

Wiliams' 2012 team returned to the NCAA tournament after finishing second in the Big East regular season, finishing 14–4 in conference play. As a No. 3 seed in the NCAA tournament, they defeated BYU and Murray State to advance to their second straight Sweet Sixteen. There, they lost to No. 7-seeded Florida.

After winning a share of the Big East Men's regular season championship, Marquette received an at-large bid in the 2013 NCAA tournament as a No. 3 seed. There, they earned come-from-behind victories over Davidson in the Second Round and Butler in the Third Round. In the Sweet Sixteen, the school's third straight under Williams, they defeated ACC regular season and conference champion Miami to earn a trip to Williams's first Elite Eight, where they lost to Syracuse.

The 2013–14 season was Williams' worst at Marquette, finishing 17–15 with a loss to Xavier in the Big East tournament.

=== Wojciechowski era ===
On April 1, 2014, Steve Wojciechowski was hired as the new Marquette head basketball coach, replacing Buzz Williams, who left for Virginia Tech.

Before the 2014-15 season, Marquette lost several players, including Jamil Wilson and Davante Gardner. The team struggled mightily, finishing 13-19 overall and 4-14 in conference play, tying for last in the conference standings. After beating Seton Hall in the first round of the Big East Tournament, Marquette lost to Villanova in the quarterfinals. Marquette failed to qualify for any postseason tournament.

The 2015-16 campaign was highlighted by Henry Ellenson, a five-star recruit from Rice Lake, Wisconsin. Ellenson won the 2016 Big East Rookie of the Year award, and was named first-team All-Big East in his lone season in the NCAA. Besides Ellenson, Luke Fischer and Haanif Cheatham also played significant roles. The Golden Eagles finished the year 20-13, with an 8-10 record in the Big East, placing 7th in the conference. Marquette's season would come to an end after losing to Xavier in the quarterfinals of the 2016 Big East Tournament.

After losing Ellenson to the NBA, Marquette reloaded with 3 four-star recruits joining the 2016-17 team, Markus Howard, Sam Hauser, and Brendan Bailey. Despite being picked to finish seventh in the Big East, Marquette finished the season tied for 3rd in the Big East, going 19–13 with a 10–8 record in the Big East. After losing to Seton Hall in the quarterfinals of the 2017 Big East Tournament, Marquette earned a 10 seed in the 2017 NCAA Tournament, their first appearance since 2013, but lost to eventual final four participants South Carolina.

After losing Luke Fischer, JaJuan Johnson, and Haanif Cheatham, Marquette added four-star recruits Jamal Cain and Ike Eke, and three-star recruits Theo John and Greg Elliott for the 2017-18 season. The team failed to match the success of the previous season, finishing 21-14 with a 9–9 record in the Big East, tying for 6th in the conference. The team was headlined by Markus Howard, Sam Hauser, and Andrew Rowsey, with the three combining for 55 PPG during the season. After beating DePaul in the first round of the 2018 Big East Tournament, Marquette lost to eventual NCAA champion Villanova in the quarterfinals. Marquette qualified as a 2 seed for the 2018 NIT, beating Harvard and Oregon before losing to 4 seed Penn State in the quarterfinals.

The 2018-19 campaign saw the team's first season in the Fiserv Forum, leaving the Bradley Center, their home since 1988. The season would end up being the best season of Wojciechowski's tenure at Marquette. Although the team lost Andrew Rowsey, Marquette signed Joey Hauser, the younger brother of Sam. The team finished 24-10 with a 12–6 record in the Big East, placing 2nd in the conference. The team saw a remarkable season for Markus Howard, who averaged 25 PPG. Sam and Joey Hauser played supporting roles, along with Theo John and Sacar Anim. In February, Marquette ranked as high as 10 in the AP poll but lost 5 of their last 9 games of the regular season, including losing dropping 4 straight to close out the regular season. Marquette beat St. John's in the quarterfinals of the 2019 Big East Tournament, but lost to Seton Hall in the semifinals, by a score of 79-81. Marquette was picked as a 5 seed in the 2019 NCAA Tournament, where they matched up against Murray State, led by eventual second overall pick in the 2019 NBA draft, Ja Morant. Murray State dominated the entire game, upsetting Marquette 83-64.

Despite high expectations for the 2019-20 season, the Hauser brothers would transfer out of the program in the offseason, hurting Marquette's chances to make it back to the NCAA tournament. Wojciechowski was able to successfully recruit Symir Torrence and Dexter Akanno, but the hole left by the Hausers was too great. While Markus Howard averaged 27.8 PPG for the season, becoming Marquette's all-time leading scorer in the process, the team finished with an 18-12 overall record, and an 8-10 record in the Big East, their worst Big East record since 2016. The team was slated to play Seton Hall in the 2020 Big East Tournament, but the tournament - and the entire season - was halted due to the outbreak of COVID-19.

The 2020-21 season was another disappointment for Marquette. With the departure of Markus Howard, the team struggled, going 13-14 overall, and 8-11 in the Big East. finishing 9th in the Big East. The incoming recruiting class looked promising however, with Dawson Garcia and Justin Lewis making an impact. Garcia stated all 27 games and averaged 13 points and 6.6 rebounds for the season, and Lewis averaging 7.8 points and 5.4 rebounds per game off the bench.

On March 19, 2021, it was announced that Marquette had fired Wojciechowski after seven seasons.

=== Smart era ===
On March 26, 2021, Marquette University hired Shaka Smart to replace Wojciechowski as the Golden Eagles head coach.

As Smart assumed control of the program, many players transferred out, including the promising Dawson Garcia, Theo John, Symir Torrence, Jamal Cain, and Koby McEwen. Additionally, D. J. Carton declared for the draft. Smart was able to land four key transfers to aid the team for the 2021-22 season: sophomores Olivier-Maxence Prosper from Clemson and Tyler Kolek from George Mason, along with graduate transfers Darryl Morsell from Maryland and Kur Kuath from Oklahoma. Smart was also able to obtain two four-star recruits from the class of 2021: Emarion Ellis and David Joplin, and three-star Keeyan Itejere, adding to the four-star and three-star that Wojciechowski recruited: Stevie Mitchell and Kam Jones.

Marquette finished the season with a surprising 19-13 record, including an 11-8 record in the Big East, tying for 5th in the conference. The team was ranked as high as 18 before a late-season skid saw the team lose 5 of their last 9 regular season games. They faced Creighton in the 2022 Big East Tournament, but lost 74-63. The team was selected as a 9 seed in the 2022 NCAA Tournament, but lost to 8 seed North Carolina in the round of 64, 95-63.

Marquette was projected to finish 9th in the Big East for the 2022-23 season, but surprised many with their best season in a decade. The team finished with a 29-7 record and won the Big East Regular Season and Tournament Titles, their first Big East Tournament win in program history. Marquette was selected as a 2 seed in the 2023 NCAA Tournament, beating 15 seed Vermont before losing to 7 seed Michigan State.

Marquette came into the 2023-24 season with lofty expectations, despite losing Olivier-Maxence Prosper to the NBA. The team never fell below 17th in the AP Poll and finished 3rd in the Big East, with a 27-9 record. In the 2024 Big East Tournament, Marquette beat Villanova in the quarterfinal and Providence in the semifinal before losing to UConn in the final. They were again selected as a 2 seed in the 2024 NCAA Tournament, defeating 15 seed Western Kentucky and 10 seed Colorado en route to their first Sweet Sixteen berth since 2013 before losing to 11 seed NC State, 67-58.

== Postseason results ==
=== NCAA tournament ===
Marquette has appeared in the NCAA tournament 37 times. Their combined record is 44–38. They were National Champions in 1977.

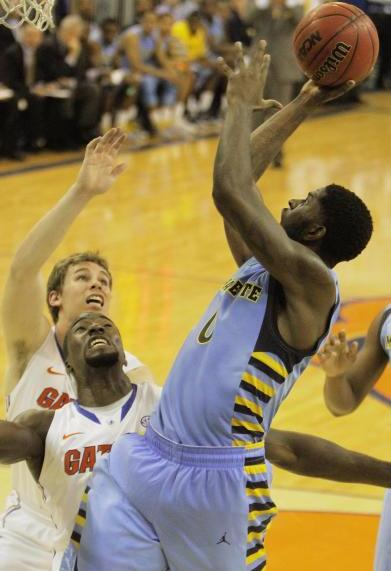
Jamil Wilson shooting in 2012

Year	Seed	Round	Opponent	Result
1955		Round of 24; Sweet Sixteen; Elite Eight	Miami (OH); Kentucky; Iowa	W 90–79; W 79–71; L 81–86
1959		Round of 23; Sweet Sixteen; Regional 3rd Place	Bowling Green; Michigan State; Kentucky	W 89–71; L 69–74; L 69–98
1961		Round of 24	Houston	L 61–77
1968		Round of 23; Sweet Sixteen; Regional 3rd Place	Bowling Green; Kentucky; East Tennessee State	W 72–71; L 89–107; W 69–57
1969		Round of 25; Sweet Sixteen; Elite Eight	Murray State; Kentucky; Purdue	W 82–62; W 81–74; L 73–75^{OT}
1971		Round of 25; Sweet Sixteen; Regional 3rd Place	Miami (OH); Ohio State; Kentucky	W 62–47; L 59–60; W 91–74
1972		Round of 25; Sweet Sixteen; Regional 3rd Place	Ohio; Kentucky; Minnesota	W 73–49; L 69–85; L 72–77
1973		Round of 25; Sweet Sixteen; Regional 3rd Place	Miami (OH); Indiana; Austin Peay	W 77–62; L 69–75; W 88–73
1974		Round of 25; Sweet Sixteen; Elite Eight; Final Four; National Championship	Ohio; Vanderbilt; Michigan; Kansas; NC State	W 85–59; W 69–61; W 72–70; W 64–51; L 64–76
1975		Round of 32	Kentucky	L 54–76
1976		Round of 32; Sweet Sixteen; Elite Eight	Western Kentucky; Western Michigan; Indiana	W 79–60; W 62–57; L 56–65
1977		Round of 32; Sweet Sixteen; Elite Eight; Final Four; National Championship	Cincinnati; Kansas State; Wake Forest; Charlotte; North Carolina	W 66–51; W 67–66; W 82–68; W 51–49; W 67–59
1978		Round of 32	Miami (OH)	L 81–84^{OT}
1979	3	Round of 32; Sweet Sixteen	6 Pacific; 2 DePaul	W 73–48; L 56–62
1980	9	Round of 48	8 Villanova	L 59–77
1982	7	Round of 48; Second Round	10 Evansville; 2 Missouri	W 67–62; L 69–73
1983	9	Round of 48	8 Tennessee	L 56–57
1993	12	First Round	5 Oklahoma State	L 62–74
1994	6	First Round; Second Round; Sweet Sixteen	11 Southwestern Louisiana; 3 Kentucky; 2 Duke	W 81–59; W 75–63; L 49–59
1996	4	First Round; Second Round	13 Monmouth; 12 Arkansas	W 68–44; L 56–65
1997	7	First Round	10 Providence	L 59–81
2002	5	First Round	12 Tulsa	L 69–71
2003	3	First Round; Second Round; Sweet Sixteen; Elite Eight; Final Four	14 Holy Cross; 6 Missouri; 2 Pittsburgh; 1 Kentucky; 2 Kansas	W 72–68; W 101–92^{OT} W 77–74; W 83–69; L 61–94
2006	7	First Round	10 Alabama	L 85–90
2007	8	First Round	9 Michigan State	L 49–61
2008	6	First Round; Second Round	11 Kentucky; 3 Stanford	W 74–66; L 81–82^{OT}
2009	6	First Round; Second Round	11 Utah State; 3 Missouri	W 58–57; L 79–83
2010	6	First Round	11 Washington	L 78–80
2011	11	First Round; Second Round; Sweet Sixteen	6 Xavier; 3 Syracuse; 2 North Carolina	W 66–55; W 66–62; L 63–81
2012	3	First Round; Second Round; Sweet Sixteen	14 BYU; 6 Murray State; 7 Florida	W 88–68; W 62–53; L 58–68
2013	3	First Round; Second Round; Sweet Sixteen; Elite Eight	14 Davidson; 6 Butler; 2 Miami (FL); 4 Syracuse	W 59–58; W 74–72; W 71–61; L 39–55
2017	10	First Round	7 South Carolina	L 73–93
2019	5	First Round	12 Murray State	L 64–83
2022	9	First Round	8 North Carolina	L 63–95
2023	2	First Round; Second Round	15 Vermont; 7 Michigan State	W 78–61; L 60–69
2024	2	First Round; Second Round; Sweet Sixteen	15 Western Kentucky; 10 Colorado; 11 NC State	W 87–69; W 81–77; L 58–67
2025	7	First Round	10 New Mexico	L 66–75

=== NIT ===
Marquette has appeared in the National Invitation Tournament 16 times. Their combined record is 23–15. In 1970, Marquette was ranked 8th and received an at-large bid to the NCAA tournament. The NCAA slotted Marquette into the Midwest regional rather than the closer Mideast regional. Al McGuire was so displeased about this that Marquette actually turned down the NCAA bid and chose to instead play in the NIT, which they won. Marquette is the only university to spurn an NCAA tournament invite. The NCAA later instituted a rule which forbade an NCAA Division I men's basketball team from spurning an NCAA bid for an NIT bid. An antitrust case by the NIT ensued over this issue, and the NCAA settled out of court.

Year	Seed	Round	Opponent	Result
1956		Round of 12	Seton Hall	L 78–96
1963		Quarterfinals; Semifinals; 3rd Place	Saint Louis; Providence; Villanova	W 84–49; L 64–70; W 66–58
1967		Round of 14; Quarterfinals; Semifinals; Final	Tulsa; Providence; Marshall; Southern Illinois	W 64–60; W 81–80^{OT} W 83–78; L 56–71
1970		Round of 16; Quarterfinals; Semifinals; Final	Massachusetts; Utah; LSU; St. John's	W 62–55; W 83–63; W 101–79; W 65–53
1981		Round of 32	Syracuse	L 81–88
1984		Round of 32; Round of 16	Iowa State; Michigan	W 73–53; L 70–83
1985		Round of 32; Round of 16; Quarterfinals	Bradley; Cincinnati; Indiana	W 77–64; W 56–54; L 82–94^{2OT}
1986		Round of 32; Round of 16	Drake; SW Missouri State	W 79–59; L 69–83
1987		Round of 32	Nebraska	L 76–78
1990		Round of 32	Penn State	L 54–57
1995		Round of 32; Round of 16; Quarterfinals; Semifinals; Final	Auburn; St. Bonaventure; South Florida; Penn State; Virginia Tech	W 68–61; W 70–61; W 67–60^{OT} W 87–79; L 64–65^{OT}
1998		Round of 32; Round of 16; Quarterfinals	Creighton; Auburn; Minnesota	W 80–68; W 75–60; L 71–73
2000		Round of 32	Xavier	L 63–67
2004		Round of 32; Round of 16; Quarterfinals	Toledo; Boise State; Iowa State	W 87–72; W 66–53; L 69–77
2005		Round of 32	Western Michigan	L 40–54
2018	2	Round of 32; Round of 16; Quarterfinals	7 Harvard; 3 Oregon; 4 Penn State	W 67–60; W 101–92; L 80–85

=== NCIT ===
Marquette appeared in the last National Catholic Invitational Tournament in 1952 and won the NCIT championship.

Year	Round	Opponent	Result
1952	Quarterfinals; Semifinals; Final	Iona; St. Francis Brooklyn; Saint Francis (PA)	W 66–59; W 79–57; W 76–64

== Awards and honors ==
=== Individual coaching honors ===
National Coach of the Year
1959	Eddie Hickey	Henry Iba Award, NABC
1971	Al McGuire	Henry Iba Award, AP, UPI
1974	Al McGuire	NABC
2023	Shaka Smart	Henry Iba Award, AP, NABC

Conference Coach of the Year
1993	Kevin O'Neill	Great Midwest Conference
1994	Kevin O'Neill	Great Midwest Conference
2002	Tom Crean	Conference USA
2003	Tom Crean	Conference USA
2023	Shaka Smart	Big East Conference

=== Individual player honors ===
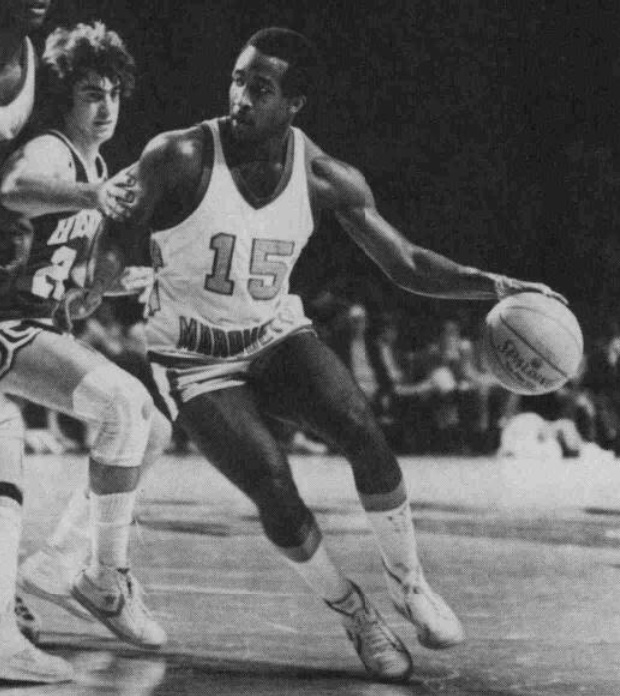
Butch Lee was the school's first NPOY in 1978.

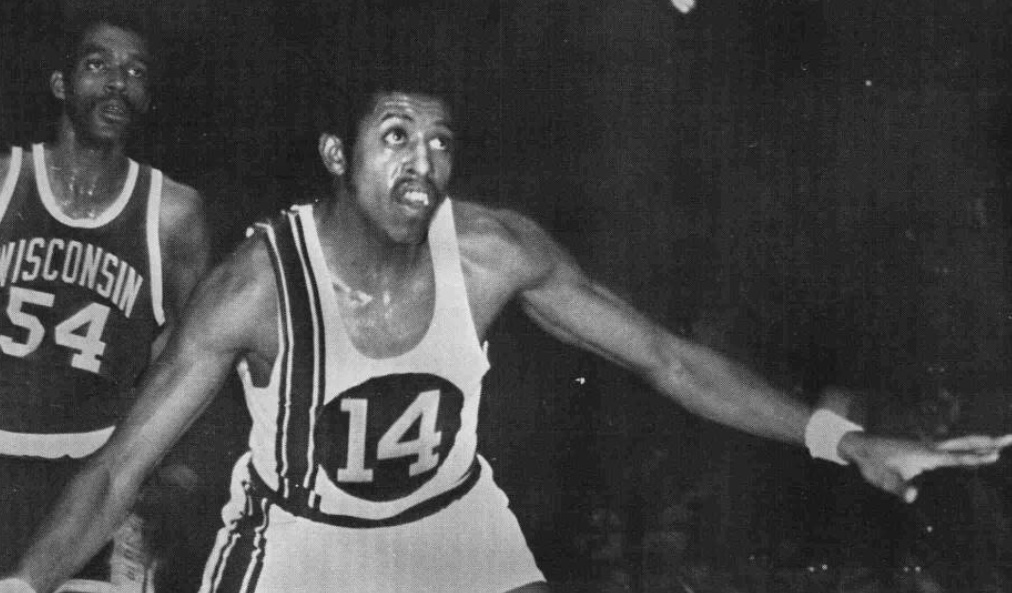
Dean Meminger was a first-team All-American in 1971.

National Player of the Year
1978	Butch Lee	Guard	Naismith, AP, UPI, Adolph Rupp Trophy

Conference Player of the Year
1994	Jim McIlvaine	Center	Great Midwest Conference
2003	Dwyane Wade	Guard	Conference USA
2012	Jae Crowder	Forward	Big East Conference
2019	Markus Howard	Guard	Big East Conference
2023	Tyler Kolek	Guard	Big East Conference

Conference individual awards
1993	Roney Eford	Guard	Great Midwest Newcomer of the Year
1998	Brian Wardle	Guard	C-USA Sixth Man of the Year
2003	Dwyane Wade	Guard	C-USA Defensive Player of the Year
2003	Steve Novak	Forward	C-USA Sixth Man of the Year
2006	Dominic James	Guard	Big East Freshman of the Year
2007	Jerel McNeal	Guard	Big East Defensive Player of the Year
2013	Davante Gardner	Forward	Big East Sixth Man of the Year
2014	Davante Gardner	Forward	Big East Sixth Man of the Year
2016	Henry Ellenson	Forward	Big East Freshman of the Year
2017	Andrew Rowsey	Guard	Big East Sixth Man of the Year
2023	David Joplin	Forward	Big East Sixth Man of the Year
2026	Nigel James Jr.	Guard	Big East Freshman of the Year

All-American team selections

Year	Name	Pos.
1971	Dean Meminger†	G
1972	Jim Chones†	C
1976	Earl Tatum‡	G
1977	Butch Lee‡	G
1978	Butch Lee†	G
1980	Sam Worthen‡	G

Year	Name	Pos.
2003	Dwyane Wade†	G
2019	Markus Howard‡	G
2020	Markus Howard†	G
2024	Tyler Kolek‡	G
2025	Kam Jones‡	G

† – denotes consensus First-Team All-American
‡ – denotes consensus Second-Team All-American

All-Conference team selections

Year	Name	Pos.	Conf.
1990	Tony Smith†	G	MCC
1990	Trevor Powell‡	F	MCC
1992	Ron Curry‡	F	Great Midwest
1992	Damon Key‡	F	Great Midwest
1993	Ron Curry†	F	Great Midwest
1993	Damon Key‡	F	Great Midwest
1993	Tony Miller‡	F	Great Midwest
1994	Jim McIlvaine†	C	Great Midwest
1994	Damon Key‡	F	Great Midwest
1994	Tony Miller‡	F	Great Midwest
1995	Roney Eford‡	G	Great Midwest
1995	Tony Miller‡	F	Great Midwest
1996	Amal McCaskill‡	C	C-USA
1997	Aaron Hutchins‡	G	C-USA
1998	Aaron Hutchins‡	G	C-USA
2000	Brian Wardle‡	G	C-USA
2001	Brian Wardle†	G	C-USA
2002	Dwyane Wade†	G	C-USA
2002	Cordell Henry‡	G	C-USA
2003	Dwyane Wade†	G	C-USA
2003	Robert Jackson‡	F	C-USA
2003	Travis Diener‡	G	C-USA
2004	Travis Diener†	G	C-USA
2005	Travis Diener†	G	C-USA
2006	Steve Novak†	F	Big East
2007	Dominic James†	F	Big East

Year	Name	Pos.	Conf.
2007	Jerel McNeal‡	G	Big East
2008	Dominic James‡	F	Big East
2008	Jerel McNeal‡	G	Big East
2008	Lazar Hayward‡	F	Big East
2009	Jerel McNeal†	G	Big East
2009	Wesley Matthews‡	G	Big East
2010	Lazar Hayward†	F	Big East
2011	Darius Johnson-Odom‡	G	Big East
2012	Darius Johnson-Odom†	G	Big East
2012	Jae Crowder†	F	Big East
2013	Vander Blue‡	G	Big East
2014	Davante Gardner‡	F	Big East
2015	Matt Carlino‡	G	Big East
2016	Henry Ellenson†	F	Big East
2018	Markus Howard‡	G	Big East
2019	Markus Howard†	G	Big East
2019	Sam Hauser‡	F	Big East
2020	Markus Howard†	G	Big East
2021	Dawson Garcia†	F	Big East
2022	Justin Lewis†	F	Big East
2023	Tyler Kolek†	G	Big East
2023	Oso Ighodaro‡	F	Big East
2023	Kam Jones‡	G	Big East
2024	Tyler Kolek†	G	Big East
2024	Oso Ighodaro‡	F	Big East
2025	Kam Jones†	G	Big East

† – denotes First-Team All-Conference
‡ – denotes Second-Team All-Conference

=== Retired numbers ===
Marquette Golden Eagles retired numbers
No.	Player	Position	Career
0	Markus Howard	SG	2016–2020
3	Dwyane Wade	SG	2001–2003
14	Dean Meminger	PG	1968–1971
15	Butch Lee	PG	1974–1978
20	Maurice Lucas	PF	1972–1974
22	Jim Chones	C	1970–1972
22	Jerel McNeal	PG	2005–2009
24	George Thompson	PG	1966–1969
31	Bo Ellis	PF	1973–1977
31	Doc Rivers	PG	1980–1983
38	Bob Weingart	Trainer (Note: Not a player but an athletic trainer. Number "38" honors the number of years he spent with the program.)	1946–1984
43	Earl Tatum	SG / SF	1972–1976
44	Don Kojis	SF	1958–1961
77	Al McGuire	Coach (Note: The "77" honors the year Marquette won their first national championship (1977), led by McGuire.)	1964–1977

=== Hall of Fame inductees ===
Naismith Memorial Basketball Hall of Fame

- Tex Winter (Contributor)
- Eddie Hickey (Coach)
- Al McGuire (Coach)
- Dwyane Wade (Player)

National Collegiate Basketball Hall of Fame

- Tex Winter (Coach)
- Eddie Hickey (Coach)
- Al McGuire (Coach)
- Rick Majerus (Coach)

== All-time career leaders ==
Lists are accurate through the 2019–20 season.

Points
Rank	Points	Player	Years
1	2761	Markus Howard	2016–20
3	2044	Kam Jones	2021-25
3	1985	Jerel McNeal	2005–09
4	1859	Lazar Hayward	2006–10
5	1773	George Thompson	1966–69
6	1749	Dominic James	2005–09
7	1735	Butch Lee	1974–78
8	1691	Travis Diener	2001–05
9	1690	Brian Wardle	1997–01
10	1688	Tony Smith	1986–90

Rebounds
Rank	Rebounds	Player	Years
1	1222	Don Kojis	1958–61
2	1085	Bo Ellis	1973–77
3	978	Terry Rand	1953–56
4	938	Walt Mangham	1957–60
5	910	Lazar Hayward	2006–10
6	771	Tom Flynn	1963–66
7	768	Paul Carbins	1964–67
8	765	Trevor Powell	1987–91
9	753	John Glaser	1955–58
10	745	Russ Wittberger	1951–55

Assists
Rank	Assists	Player	Years
1	956	Tony Miller	1991–95
2	697	Tyler Kolek	2021-24
3	632	Dominic James	2005–09
4	617	Travis Diener	2001–05
5	550	Aaron Hutchins	1994–98
6	480	Lloyd Walton	1973–76
7	469	Tony Smith	1986–90
8	455	Jerel McNeal	2005–09
9	435	Junior Cadougan	2009–13
10	430	Cordell Henry	1998–02

Steals
Rank	Steals	Player	Years
1	287	Jerel McNeal	2005–09
2	272	Mike Wilson	1978–82
3	253	Mandy Johnson	1981–85
4	238	Dominic James	2005–09
5	215	Stevie Mitchell	2021-Current
6	203	Doc Rivers	1980–83
7	190	Tony Smith	1986–90
8	188	Michael Sims	1984–88
9	185	Tony Miller	1991–95
10	165	Aaron Hutchins	1994–98

Blocks
Rank	Blocks	Player	Years
1	399	Jim McIlvaine	1990–94
2	175	Amal McCaskill	1991–92, 93–96
3	172	Faisal Abraham	1993–97
4	153	Luke Fischer	2014–17
5	151	Theo John	2017–21
6	145	Chris Otule	2008–14
7	130	Oso Ighodaro	2020-24
8	119	Mike Wilson	1978–82
9	113	Scott Merritt	2000–04
10	103	Walter Downing	1984–86

== Professional players ==
=== Golden Eagles in the NBA ===
==== Current ====
Player	Team
Jimmy Butler	Golden State Warriors
Jamal Cain	Orlando Magic
Sam Hauser	Boston Celtics
Oso Ighodaro	Phoenix Suns
Tyler Kolek	New York Knicks
Olivier-Maxence Prosper	Memphis Grizzlies
Kam Jones	Milwaukee Bucks
Chase Ross	Los Angeles Lakers

==== All-time ====
Player	NBA draft	Years	Career highlights and awards
Bill Downey	1944 no NBA	1947–48	
Gene Berce	1948 drafted	1949–50	
Don Kojis	1961 Round 2 Pick 21	1963–75	2× NBA All-Star (1968, 1969)
George Thompson	1969 Round 5 Pick 66	1974–75	
Joe Thomas	1970 Round 6 Pick 95	1970–71	
Dean Meminger	1971 Round 1 Pick 16	1971–77	NBA Champion (1973)
Larry McNeill	1973 Round 2 Pick 25	1973–79	
Jim Chones	1973 Round 2 Pick 31	1974–82	NBA Champion (1980)
Allie McGuire	1973 Round 3 Pick 49	1973–74	
Maurice Lucas	1974 Round 1 Pick 14	1976–88	NBA Champion (1977); 4× NBA All-Star (1977–1979, 1983); All-NBA Second Team (1978)
Earl Tatum	1976 Round 2 Pick 21	1976–80	
Lloyd Walton	1976 Round 3 Pick 40	1976–81	
Bo Ellis	1977 Round 1 Pick 17	1977–80	
Butch Lee	1978 Round 1 Pick 10	1978–80	NBA Champion (1980)
Jerome Whitehead	1978 Round 2 Pick 41	1978–89	
Bernard Toone	1979 Round 2 Pick 37	1979–80	
Sam Worthen	1980 Round 2 Pick 26	1980–82	
Mike Wilson	1982 Round 3 Pick 47	1983–85, 86–87	
Doc Rivers	1983 Round 2 Pick 31	1983–96	NBA All-Star (1988)
Tom Copa	1987 Undrafted	1991–92	
Tony Smith	1990 Round 2 Pick 51	1990–98, 00–01	
Jim McIlvaine	1994 Round 2 Pick 32	1994–01	
Amal McCaskill	1996 Round 2 Pick 49	1996–97, 01–04	
Chris Crawford	1997 Round 2 Pick 50	1997–04	
Dwyane Wade	2003 Round 1 Pick 5	2003–19	3× NBA Champion (2006, 2012, 2013); 13× NBA All-Star (2005–2016, 2019); 2× All-NBA First Team (2009, 2010); 3× All-NBA Second Team (2005, 2006, 2011); 3× All-NBA Third Team (2007, 2012, 2013)
Travis Diener	2005 Round 2 Pick 38	2005–10	
Steve Novak	2006 Round 2 Pick 32	2006–17	
Wesley Matthews	2009 Undrafted	2009–present	
Jerel McNeal	2009 Undrafted	2014–15	
Lazar Hayward	2010 Round 1 Pick 30	2010–13	
Jimmy Butler	2011 Round 1 Pick 30	2011–present	5× NBA All-Star (2015–2018, 2020); 3× All-NBA Third Team (2017, 2018, 2020)
Dwight Buycks	2011 Undrafted	2013–15, 17–18	
Jae Crowder	2012 Round 2 Pick 34	2012–present	
Darius Johnson-Odom	2012 Round 2 Pick 55	2012–14	
Vander Blue	2013 Undrafted	2013–15, 17–18	
Jamil Wilson	2014 Undrafted	2017–18	
Juan Toscano-Anderson	2015 Undrafted	2019–present	
Henry Ellenson	2016 Round 1 Pick 18	2016–2020	
Deonte Burton	2017 Undrafted	2018–present	
Markus Howard	2020 Undrafted	2020–present	
Olivier-Maxence Prosper	2023 Round 1 Pick 24	2023–present	
Oso Ighodaro	2024 Round 2 Pick 40	2024–present	
Tyler Kolek	2024 Round 2 Pick 34	2024–present	NBA Champion (2026)
Kam Jones	2024 Round 2 Pick 38	2025–present	

=== Golden Eagles in the NBA G-League ===
Player	Pos.	Team	NBA affiliate
D.J. Carton	PG	Birmingham Squadron	Pelicans
Stevie Mitchell	PG	Rio Grande Valley Vipers	Rockets

=== Golden Eagles in international leagues ===
==== Current players overseas ====
Player	Pos.	Team	Country
Jae Crowder	SF	Vaqueros de Bayamon	(Puerto Rico)
Henry Ellenson	PF	Wonju Dongbu Promy	(South Korea)
David Joplin	PF	Calgary Surge	(Canada)
Justin Lewis	SF	Limoges CSP	(France)

==== All-time players overseas ====
- Sacar Anim (born 1997), basketball player in the Israeli Basketball Premier League
- Niv Berkowitz (born 1986), Israeli basketball player in the Israeli Basketball Premier League
- Joseph Chartouny, Lebanese Basketball League
- Sandy Cohen (born 1995), American-Israeli basketball player in the Israeli Basketball Premier League
- Henry Ellenson, Liga ACB
- Jayce Johnson (born 1997), basketball player in the Liga Națională
- Markus Howard, Saski Baskonia
- Jamil Wilson (born 1990), basketball player for Hapoel Jerusalem in the Israeli Basketball Premier League
