= Torey Thomas =

American basketball player

Personal information
- Born: February 26, 1985 (age 41) White Plains, New York, U.S.
- Listed height: 5 ft 11 in (1.80 m)
- Listed weight: 185 lb (84 kg)

Career information
- High school: Trinity Catholic (Stamford, Connecticut)
- College: Holy Cross (2003–2007)
- NBA draft: 2007: undrafted
- Playing career: 2007–2020
- Position: Point guard

Career history
- 2007–2008: Akropol BBK
- 2008–2009: Hanzevast Capitals
- 2009–2010: Matrixx Magixx
- 2010: Guaros de Lara
- 2010–2011: Turów Zgorzelec
- 2011–2012: Spartak Primorye
- 2012: Metros de Santiago
- 2012: Partizan
- 2012–2013: VL Pesaro
- 2013: Aliağa Petkim
- 2013–2014: Le Mans Sarthe
- 2014: Cholet
- 2014–2015: Aris Thessaloniki
- 2015–2016: Rosa Radom
- 2016: MZT Skopje
- 2016–2017: AEK Larnaca
- 2017–2018: ADA Blois
- 2019: AZS Koszalin
- 2020: STB Le Havre

Career highlights
- Pro B champion (2018); Macedonian Super Cup MVP (2016); Macedonian Super Cup winner (2016); Polish Cup winner (2016); Greek League steals leader (2015); Russian League All-Symbolic Second Team (2012); PLK Most Valuable Player (2011); DBL All-Star (2010); DBL assists leader (2010); DBL steals leader (2010); Patriot League Defensive Player of the Year (2007); First-team All-Patriot League (2007); Second-team All-Patriot League (2006)

Torey Jamal Thomas (born February 26, 1985) is an American former professional basketball player.

== High school and college career ==
Thomas attended Trinity Catholic High School in Stamford, Connecticut. He played college basketball at the College of the Holy Cross. In his four-year career with the Holy Cross Crusaders, he played 125 games, averaging 9.6 points, 4.1 rebounds, 3.7 assists and 2.1 steals per game.

== Professional career ==
Thomas averaged 25.6 points, 7.6 rebounds, 6.6 assists and 3.1 steals per game for Akropol in his first season as professional player. Later he was named the Player of the Year in the Swedish Basketligan.

Thomas signed one-year contract in July 2008 with Hanzevast Capitals of the Netherlands. After finished season, Thomas remained in the same league, this time he signed with Matrixx Magixx.

On July 12, 2010, Thomas signed with PGE Turow. Playing for Turów Zgorzelec, Thomas averaged 14.4 points, 4.2 rebounds and 5.7 assists per game over 41 games. At the end of the season, he was named MVP of the Polish Basketball League.

In August 2011, he signed with the Russian club Spartak Primorye, alongside future teammate Jekeel Akindele.

On September 3, 2012, Thomas agreed to sign a one-year contract with Partizan Belgrade. On November 15, 2012, he parted ways with Partizan. On December 22, 2012, he signed with Scavolini Pesaro for the rest of the season.

On June 22, 2013, Thomas signed one-year deal with Aliağa Petkim. He was released on October 22, 2013. In December 2013, he signed with Le Mans. He left them in January 2014, and signed with Cholet Basket. On April 2, 2014, he parted ways with Cholet.

On August 23, 2014, he signed a one-year deal with Aris Thessaloniki.

On July 7, 2015, Thomas signed with Rosa Radom of the Polish Basketball League.

On September 10, 2016, Thomas signed with Macedonian club MZT Skopje for the 2016–17 season. On October 10, 2016, he parted ways with MZT after appearing in only three ABA league games. Two days later he signed with Petrolina AEK Larnaca for the rest of the season.

On July 24, 2017, Thomas signed a one-year deal with French club ADA Blois Basket 41 of the LNB Pro B.

ASZ Koszalin 2019–2020 Season Top League in Poland.

2020–2021 Quimper French ProB. All Bosman Team

2021 Le Havre French NM1

== Career statistics ==
Legend
GP	Games played	GS	Games started	MPG	Minutes per game
FG%	Field goal percentage	3P%	3-point field goal percentage	FT%	Free throw percentage
RPG	Rebounds per game	APG	Assists per game	SPG	Steals per game
BPG	Blocks per game	PPG	Points per game	**Bold**	Career high

=== College ===
Year	Team	GP	GS	MPG	SPG	BPG	RPG	APG	PPG	FG%	3P%	FT%
2003–04	Holy Cross	28	0	14.1	1.4	0.0	2.1	1.5	5.1	.324	.259	.769
2004–05	Holy Cross	31	22	25.5	1.8	0.0	4.1	3.7	7.7	.385	.240	.683
2005–06	Holy Cross	32	31	36.4	2.4	0.0	5.3	4.8	11.0	.392	.354	.679
2006–07	Holy Cross	34	34	37.6	2.8	0.0	4.7	4.7	13.7	.375	.403	.771
