= Frank Turner (basketball) =

American basketball player

free agent
- Position: Point guard

Personal information
- Born: May 25, 1988 (age 38) Atlantic City, New Jersey, U.S.
- Listed height: 1.80 m (5 ft 11 in)
- Listed weight: 80 kg (176 lb)

Career information
- High school: Atlantic City (Atlantic City, New Jersey)
- College: Canisius (2006–2010)
- NBA draft: 2010: undrafted
- Playing career: 2010–present

Career history
- 2010: Buffalo Stampede
- 2010–2012: EiffelTowers Den Bosch
- 2012–2013: Trefl Sopot
- 2013: Fos Provence
- 2013–2014: Antwerp Giants
- 2014–2015: U-BT Cluj-Napoca
- 2015–2016: Rilski Sportist
- 2016–2017: ADA Blois
- 2017–2019: Crailsheim Merlins
- 2019–2020: Körmend
- 2020–2021: Alba Fehérvár
- 2021–2022: MZT Skopje

Career highlights
- Bulgarian Cup champion (2016); Dutch League champion (2012); Polish Cup champion (2013); All-DBL Team (2012); 2× DBL assists leader (2011, 2012); DBL steals leader (2011); DBL All-Star Game MVP (2012); DBL All-Star (2012)

Frank Rahim Turner (born May 25, 1988) is an American professional basketball player who last played for MZT Skopje. Standing at 5 ft 11 in (1.80 m), Turner plays as point guard.

Turner graduated from Atlantic City High School in 2006.

== Career ==
In December 2014, Turner signed with the Romanian team U-BT Cluj-Napoca.

On July 14, 2016, Turner signed with ADA Blois Basket of the French LNB Pro B.

On August 31, 2017, Turner signed with Crailsheim Merlins of the German second division ProA. Turner played two seasons with Crailsheim.

On September 7, 2019, he has signed with Egis Körmend of the NB I/A.

== Honours and titles ==
=== Club ===
Rilski Sportist

- Bulgarian Cup: 2016

EiffelTowers Den Bosch

- Dutch Basketball League: 2011–12

Trefl Sopot

- Polish Cup: 2013

=== Individual awards ===
- All-DBL Team: 2011–12
- DBL assists leader (2): 2010–11, 2011–12
- DBL steals leader: 2010–11
- DBL All-Star Game MVP: 2012
- DBL All-Star: 2012
