= Dominic James (basketball) =

American basketball player

Personal information
- Born: October 5, 1986 (age 40) Richmond, Indiana, U.S.
- Listed height: 5 ft 11 in (1.80 m)
- Listed weight: 180 lb (82 kg)

Career information
- High school: Richmond (Richmond, Indiana)
- College: Marquette (2005–2009)
- NBA draft: 2009: undrafted
- Playing career: 2009–2019
- Position: Point guard

Career history
- 2009–2010: Mersin
- 2010–2011: Lukoil Academic
- 2011–2012: Aris
- 2012: Partizan
- 2012–2013: Pallacanestro Reggiana
- 2013: Poitiers Basket 86
- 2014–2015: Al Rayyan
- 2015–2016: Al Gharafa Doha
- 2016–2017: El Jaish SC
- 2017: Greensboro Swarm
- 2018: Al-Shamal SC
- 2018–2019: Al Sadd

Career highlights
- Serbian League champion (2012); Serbian Cup winner (2012); Bulgarian League champion (2011); Bulgarian Cup champion (2011); Honorable mention All-American – AP (2007); Big East Rookie of the year (2006); First-team All-Big East (2007); Second-Team All-Big East (2008)

Dominic Davon James (born October 5, 1986) is an American former professional basketball player.

== College career ==
=== Freshman season & Big East Rookie of the year ===
In 2005–06, James came in as one of the best freshman in the country, averaging 15.3 points (second on the team, 13th in the big east, and the best freshman scorer in the big east.), 5.4 assists (his 167 assists were ranked third-overall in the conference and the top freshman, nationally ranked 29th in the nation and the fourth-highest freshman total, also ranked second on the freshman season assists list behind Tony Miller's 221, and James 5.4 assists were also ranked third-overall in the big east.) and 4.5 rebounds and 1.6 steals per game (tied 11th in Big East). He was one of three players at Marquette to start every game, he scored a freshman season scoring record 473 points topping Doc Rivers mark that stood for 25 seasons. while being named Big East Rookie of the Year, unanimous Big East all-rookie team pick, honorable-mention all-big east and collegehoops.net first-team all-rookie honors. On November 19, 2005, he played 37 minutes, scoring 15 against Winthrop to earn all-tournament at the Pepsi blue and gold classic, he was also named big east rookie of the week on November 21 following the first week of the season. James was selected to the great Alaska shootout after scoring 41 points in three games while dishing a career high nine assists against South Carolina on November 26, 2005. James topped his previous career high 28 points with a team leading 29 points at DePaul University on January 17, 2006. James notched his first double-double of the season at the University of Louisville on March 1, 2006, with 16 points and a team leading 11 rebounds.

=== Sophomore season ===
Dominic James had another great year in his sophomore season. Coming in as a unanimous preseason all-big east and Was named to the John r. wooden award preseason top 50, Rivals.com preseason all-America first-team and other preseason awards. At the end of the season he was named first-team all-big east and AP Honorable-Mention all-America. On March 3, 2007, James tallied a career high 10 assists while missing eight minutes due to cramps in the Golden Eagles' victory over 12th ranked Pittsburgh. After the 2006–07 season, James entered the 2007 NBA draft but withdrew on June 17, 2007.

=== Junior season ===
During the 2007–08 season he averaged 12.9 points, 4.4 assists and 1.8 steals per game which led to him earning all-big east second-team, rivals.com all-big east second-team and usbwa all-district v team. Was one of 16 finalists for the Bob Cousy Award

=== Senior Season ===
His college career was thought to be finished on February 25, 2009, when he broke the fifth metatarsal bone in his left foot in a 93–82 loss to the Connecticut Huskies. However, on March 29, 2009, James was cleared to play in the Golden Eagles' second round matchup against Missouri late on the eve of the game.

== Career Accomplishments ==
- 2nd on Marquette's all-time career list in assists (632)
- 4th on Marquette's all-time career list in steals (238)
- tied 9th on Marquette's all-time career list in three-point field goals (169)
- 5th on Marquette's all-time career list in three-point field goals attempted (581)
- tied 8th on Marquette's all-time career list in free throws attempted (529)
- tied 8th on Marquette's all-time career list in wins (94)
- Marquette Freshman single season record for most points (473, 2005–06)
- 2nd on Marquette's single season freshman assist list (167, 2005–06)
- 4th on Marquette's all-time career list in points scored (1,749, 2005–09)

== Honors ==
- Big East Rookie of the Year (2006)
- Unanimous Big East All-Rookie Team (2006)
- Honorable-Mention All-Big East (2006)
- Pepsi Blue And Gold Classic All-Tournament Team (2005–06)
- Great Alaska Shootout All-Tournament Team (2005–06)
- CollegeHoops.Net First-Team All-Rookie (2006)
- 6x Big East Rookie of the week (2005–06)
- AP Honorable-Mention All-American (2007)
- First-Team All-Big East (2007)
- Naismith Award Finalist (2007)
- Bob Cousy Award Finalist (2007)
- NABC District 1 All-District First-Team (2007)
- CBE Classic MVP (2006–07)
- USBWA All-District Team (2007)
- Second-Team All-Big East (2008)
- Rivals.Com Second-Team All-Big East (2008)
- NABC District 11 First-Team (2008)
- USBWA All-District V Team (2008)
- Serbian League champion (2012)
- Serbian Cup winner (2012)

== Professional career ==
James went undrafted in the 2009 NBA draft, but was invited to play for the Milwaukee Bucks in the 2009 Las Vegas Summer League. However, James suffered an injury while practicing with the team prior to the start of the Summer League and was consequently removed from the roster. James was later invited to participate in the Bucks' training camp. A little over a week into training camp, James was released. He received an offer from Turkish team Mersin Büyükşehir Belediyesi SK in October 2009. James spent the 2010–11 season with PBC Lukoil Academic in Bulgaria. In October 2011, James signed with Aris BC in Greece. In January 2012, he left Aris due to unpaid wages and moved to play in Serbia for KK Partizan. In February 2013 he played for Poitiers Basket 86 (ProA), where he scored 34 points in his first game against one of the best teams of the championship.

== Career statistics ==
Legend
GP	Games played	GS	Games started	MPG	Minutes per game
FG%	Field goal percentage	3P%	3-point field goal percentage	FT%	Free throw percentage
RPG	Rebounds per game	APG	Assists per game	SPG	Steals per game
BPG	Blocks per game	PPG	Points per game	**Bold**	Career high

=== College statistics ===
Year	Team	GP	GS	MPG	FG%	3P%	FT%	RPG	APG	SPG	BPG	PPG
2005–06	Marquette Golden Eagles	31	31	32.5	**.431**	.301	.641	**4.5**	**5.4**	1.6	**.4**	**15.3**
2006–07	Marquette Golden Eagles	34	**34**	**33.2**	.384	.272	.651	3.1	4.9	1.9	.1	14.9
2007–08	Marquette Golden Eagles	**35**	**34**	30.3	.398	**.310**	**.664**	2.7	4.4	1.8	.2	12.9
2008–09	Marquette Golden Eagles	29	28	31.4	.424	.284	.461	3.4	5.0	**2.1**	.3	11.0
