= Sacar Anim =

American basketball player (born 1997)

No. 15 – Science City Jena
- Position: Shooting guard
- League: Basketball Bundesliga

Personal information
- Born: September 19, 1997 (age 29) Minneapolis, Minnesota, U.S.
- Listed height: 6 ft 5 in (1.96 m)
- Listed weight: 210 lb (95 kg)

Career information
- High school: DeLaSalle (Minneapolis, Minnesota)
- College: Marquette (2015–2020)
- NBA draft: 2020: undrafted
- Playing career: 2020–present

Career history
- 2020–2021: Agua Caliente Clippers
- 2021–2022: Medi Bayreuth
- 2022–2023: Grissin Bon Reggio Emilia
- 2023–2024: Hapoel Eilat
- 2024: Igokea
- 2024–2025: Scafati Basket
- 2025–2026: CSO Voluntari
- 2026–present: Science City Jena

Career highlights
- Bosnian Cup winner (2025)

Sacar Anim (born September 19, 1997) is an American professional basketball player for Science City Jena of the Basketball Bundesliga (BBL). He played four years of college basketball for the Marquette Golden Eagles, and plays the shooting guard position.

== Early life ==
Anim was born in Minneapolis, Minnesota. His parents are Sam (a four-year starter in high school basketball) and Carla Anim. He is 6 ft 5 in (196 cm), and weighs 210 pounds (95 kg).

== High school career ==
Anim attended DeLaSalle High School ('15) in Minneapolis. He played basketball for the Islanders and was named the Associated Press Player of the Year in Minnesota as a senior. He averaged 25.0 points and 8.0 rebounds per game in 2014–15, and was his division's top scorer in the state tournament, earning him a spot on the all-tournament team. He was a three-time all-conference selection, and was selected to play in the Minnesota State Basketball Coaches All-Star Game after his senior year.

== College career ==
An ESPN four-star basketball recruit, Anim committed to Marquette University ('20) in Wisconsin, where he earned a degree in advertising. Anim then studied Corporate Communication at the Marquette Graduate School of Management.

In the 2015–16 season, as a freshman at Marquette, Anim played for the Marquette Golden Eagles in 16 games, and averaged 1.2 points per game, playing 5.2 minutes per game.

The following season, he redshirted for Marquette. In the 2017-18 campaign, as a redshirt sophomore, he averaged 7.6 points and 2.8 rebounds, while shooting 48.1 percent from the floor.

In the 2018–19 season, as a redshirt junior, he averaged 8.3 points and 3.1 rebounds, while shooting 43.8 percent from the floor and 39.1 percent from 3-point range (42.5% in Big East regular season games, 3rd in the conference). He was praised especially for his defensive skills.

In the 2019–20 season, as a redshirt senior, Anim was ranked 15th in the Big East in scoring (13.1 points per game), 9th in 3-point field goal percentage (.392), and 9th in minutes played per game (33.5).

== Professional career ==
In 2020–21, Anim played for the Agua Caliente Clippers in the G League; he played in 11 games, averaging 3.2 points per game. He joined the rest of the team as they spent an abbreviated season in a bubble at Disney World outside Orlando, Florida, the same isolation bubble used for the 2020 NBA Bubble.

In 2021–22, he played for Medi Bayreuth in the ProA in Germany. Anim signed with the team on July 9, 2021, and averaged 13.2 points per game.

In 2022–23, he played for Grissin Bon Reggio Emilia in the Lega Basket Serie A in Italy, with whom Anim signed on July 11, 2022. He averaged 9.6 points per game, while shooting 38.4% from three point range.

In 2023–24, Anim played for Hapoel Eilat in the Israeli Basketball Premier League.

On June 21, 2024, he signed with Igokea in the ABA League.

On December 19, 2024, he signed with Scafati Basket of the Lega Basket Serie A (LBA).

On July 31, 2025, he signed with CSO Voluntari of the Liga Națională.
