= Amal McCaskill =

American basketball player (born 1973)

Personal information
- Born: October 28, 1973 (age 53) Maywood, Illinois, U.S.
- Listed height: 6 ft 11 in (2.11 m)
- Listed weight: 235 lb (107 kg)

Career information
- High school: St. Joseph (Westchester, Illinois)
- College: Marquette (1992–1996)
- NBA draft: 1996: 2nd round, 49th overall pick
- Drafted by: Orlando Magic
- Playing career: 1996–2012
- Position: Center
- Number: 00, 15

Career history
- 1996–1997: Orlando Magic
- 1997–1998: Fort Wayne Fury
- 1998: FC Barcelona
- 1998–1999: Panionios
- 1999–2000: León Caja España
- 2000: Proaguas Costablanca Alicante
- 2001: Guaiqueríes de Margarita
- 2001: Brujos de Guayama
- 2001–2002: San Antonio Spurs
- 2002: Atlanta Hawks
- 2003: Fórum Filatélico
- 2003–2004: Philadelphia 76ers
- 2004: Climamio Bologna
- 2005: Sagesse Beirut
- 2007–2008: Albany Patroons
- 2009: Qingdao DoubleStar
- 2009: Igokea
- 2009–2011: Incheon ET
- 2011: Goyang Orions
- 2011–2012: KTP Basket
- 2012: Seoul SK Knights
- 2012: Gaiteros del Zulia
- 2012: Ulsan Mobis Phoebus
- Stats at NBA.com
- Stats at Basketball Reference

Amal Omari McCaskill (born October 28, 1973) is an American former professional basketball player who played the center position.

== Career ==
After a four-year career at Marquette University, McCaskill was selected by the National Basketball Association's Orlando Magic with the 49th pick (second round) of the 1996 NBA draft. He appeared in four seasons with as many teams: 1996–97 with Orlando, 2001–02 with the San Antonio Spurs, 2002–03 with the Atlanta Hawks, and 2003–04 with the Philadelphia 76ers.

After his release from Orlando in 1997 (and Philadelphia in 2004), McCaskill played as an import in Greece, Spain, Venezuela, Puerto Rico, Italy and Lebanon. In the United States, he also appeared for the CBA's Fort Wayne Fury in 1997–98 and the Albany Patroons in 2007–08.

In June 2008, McCaskill moved to the Philippine Basketball Association, as an import for the Magnolia Beverage Masters, helping the team reach the semi-finals.
