= Bill Scholl =

Athletic director (born 1957)

- Born: February 9, 1957
- Education: Bachelor's Degree - Notre Dame '79
- Alma mater: University of Notre Dame
- Occupation: Athletic Director
- Years active: 2015-current

Bill Scholl (born September 2, 1957) is the Director of Intercollegiate Athletics for Marquette University. Bill Scholl spent 23 years working in the University of Notre Dame athletics department before accepting a position at Ball State University as the Director of Intercollegiate Athletics. After three years at Ball State, Scholl relocated where he is now the Director of Intercollegiate Athletics at Marquette University.

== Career ==
- Marquette University, Director of Intercollegiate Athletics, 2015–present
- Ball State University, Director of Intercollegiate Athletics, 2012–15
- Notre Dame, Deputy Athletics Director, 2009–12
- Notre Dame, Senior Associate Athletics Director, 2004–09
- Notre Dame, Assistant Athletics Director, 1995–04
- Notre Dame, Director of Ticketing and Marketing, 1992–95
- Notre Dame, Sports Marketing Manager, 1989–92
- Logan Center, Director of Financial Development, 1988–89
- International Summer Special Olympic Games, director of financial development, 1985–87
- Juhl Advertising Agency, public relations, 1979–85

== Education ==
Bachelor's Degree - University of Notre Dame '79
