= 2009–10 Dutch Basketball League =

Dutch Basketball League
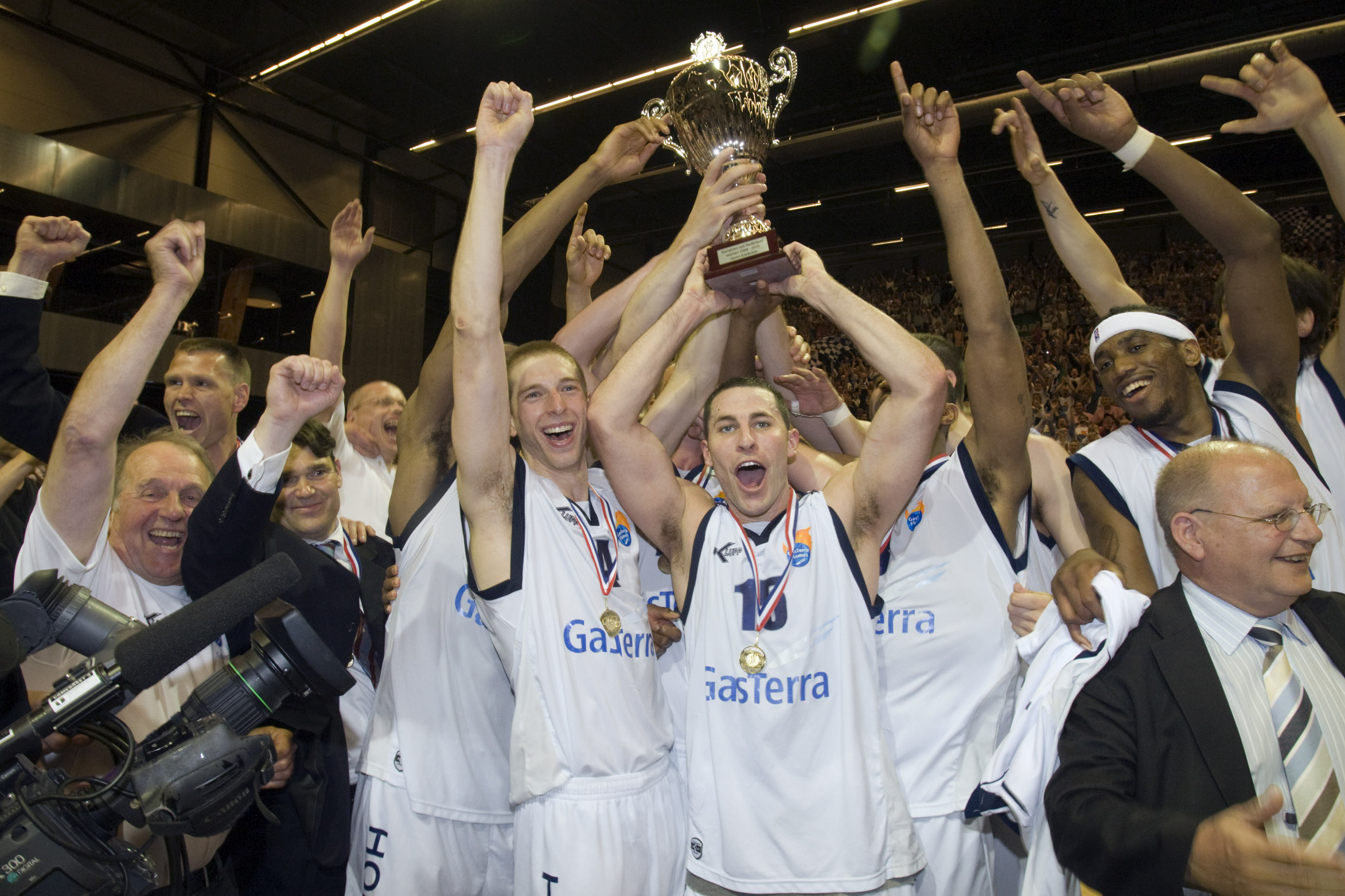
- Players of GasTerra Flames celebrating winning the DBL title
- Season: 2009–10
- Teams: 10

Regular season
- Top seed: GasTerra Flames
- Season MVP: (United States) Danny Gibson

Finals
- Champions: GasTerra Flames (4th title)
- Runners-up: WCAA Giants

Statistical leaders
Points	(United States) Danny Gibson	18.8
Rebounds	(Netherlands) Patrick Hilliman	10.1
Assists	(United States) Torey Thomas	7.2
Index Rating	(United States) Elijah Palmer	21.1

The 2009–10 Dutch Basketball League (DBL) was the 50th season of the Dutch Basketball League, the highest professional basketball league in the Netherlands. GasTerra Flames dominated throughout the regular season and lost just three games. Zorg en Zekerheid Leiden player Danny Gibson was league top scorer and won the Most Valuable Player award. GasTerra Flames eventually won its third title in team history, by beating World Class Aviation Academy Giants 4–1 in the playoff finals.

It was the first year the league was named the Dutch Basketball League (DBL), after previously being known as the Eredivisie.

== Teams ==
Team	City	Arena	Head coach
ABC Amsterdam	Amsterdam	Sporthallen Zuid	(Netherlands) Ferry Steenmetz
WCAA Giants	Bergen op Zoom	Sporthal Boulevard	(Netherlands) Erik Braal
EiffelTowers Den Bosch	's-Hertogenbosch	Maaspoort	(United States) Don Beck (Netherlands) Maarten van Gent (ad. int.)
GasTerra Flames	Groningen	Martiniplaza	(Netherlands) Marco van den Berg
De Friesland Aris	Leeuwarden	Sporthal Kalverdijkje	(United States) Pete Miller
Zorg en Zekerheid Leiden	Leiden	Vijf Meihal	(Netherlands) Toon van Helfteren
Matrixx Magixx	Nijmegen	De Horstacker	(Netherlands) Michael Schuurs
Rotterdam Challengers	Rotterdam	Topsportcentrum Rotterdam	(Netherlands) Zlatko Jezerkic
Upstairs Weert	Weert	Sporthal Boshoven	(Netherlands) Olivier van Kempen
Landstede	Zwolle	ZBC Hal	(Netherlands) Adriaan van Bergen

== Regular season ==
Pos	Team	Pld	W	L	PF	PA	PD	Pts	Qualification or relegation
1	GasTerra Flames	36	33	3	3126	2580	+546	66	Qualification for playoffs
2	WCAA Giants	36	24	12	2915	2619	+296	48	Qualification for playoffs
3	EiffelTowers Den Bosch	36	24	12	2963	2751	+212	48	Qualification for playoffs
4	Matrixx Magixx	36	23	13	2893	2677	+216	46	Qualification for playoffs
5	ZZ Leiden	36	22	14	2836	2685	+151	44	Qualification for playoffs
6	De Friesland Aris	36	19	17	2887	2900	−13	38	Qualification for playoffs
7	ABC Amsterdam	36	14	22	2571	2658	−87	28	Qualification for playoffs
8	Upstairs Weert	26	12	14	2687	2977	−290	24	Qualification for playoffs
9	Landstede	36	5	31	2537	2955	−418	10	
10	Rotterdam Challengers	36	4	32	2291	2904	−613	8	

Source: DBL

== Playoffs ==
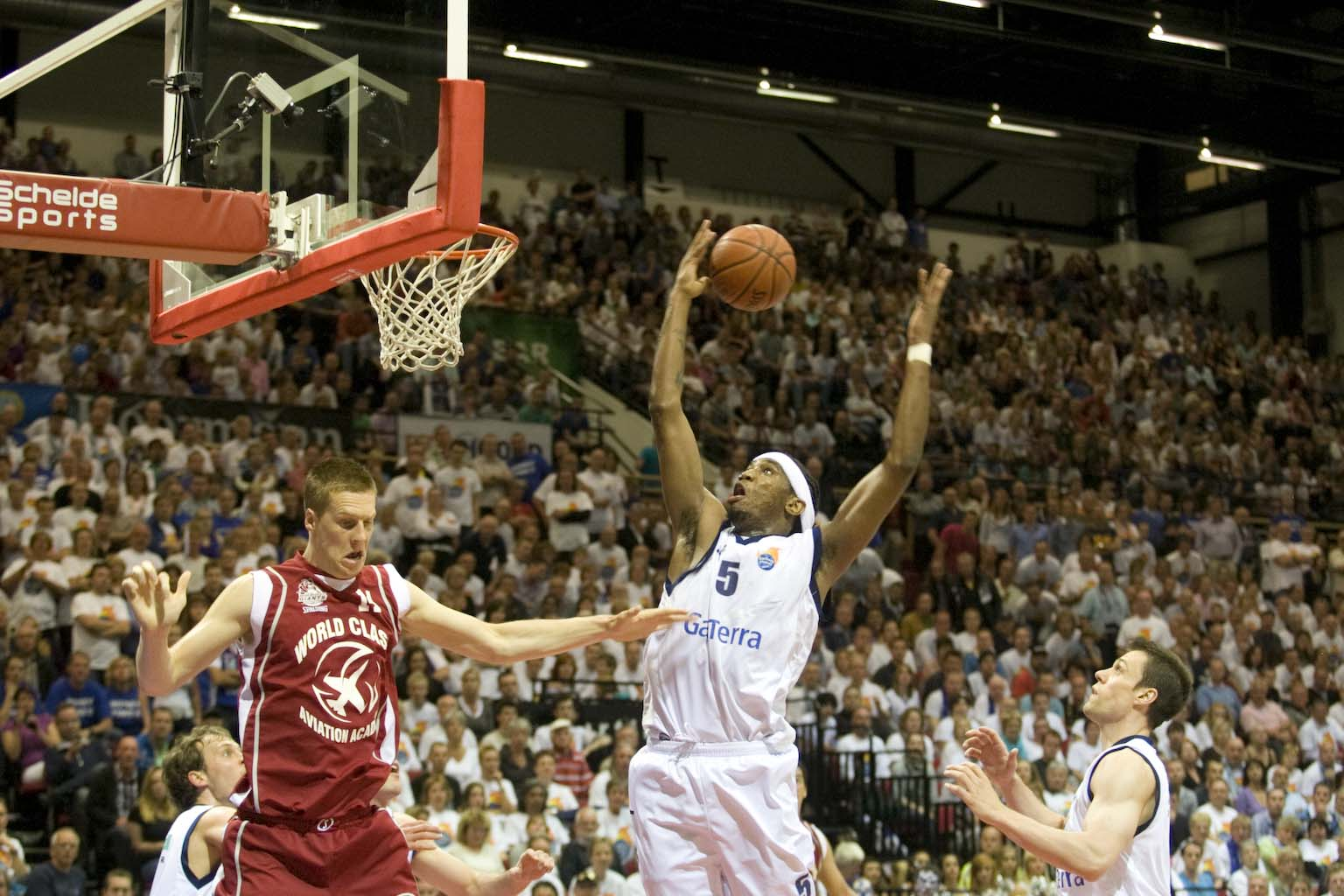
Scene of the playoff final between GasTerra Flames and WCAA Giants

The playoffs started on 22 April and ended 25 May 2010. The winner of the playoffs was crowned Dutch national champion. In the quarterfinals a best-of-three format is used, while in the semifinals and finals are played in respectively a best-of-five format and best-of-seven format. The higher seeded team had home advantage and played games one, three, five and seven (if possible) at home. Small bold numbers indicate team seeding.

Quarterfinals; 22–25 April
**1** GasTerra Flames	**106**	**77**
**8** Upstairs Weert	68	61
**4** Matrixx Magixx	62	62
**5** ZZ Leiden	**67**	**94**
**2** WCAA Giants	**71**	**78**
**7** ABC Amsterdam	54	74
**3** EiffelTowers Den Bosch	82	75
**6** De Friesland Aris	**85**	**87**

Semifinals; 1–13 May
**1** GasTerra Flames	67	**79**	**67**	88	**80**
**5** ZZ Leiden	**76**	74	63	**90**	70
**2** WCAA Giants	**93**	**92**	95	**83**
**6** De Friesland Aris	80	77	**97**	71

Finals; 15–25 May
**1** GasTerra Flames	**89**	**80**	**84**	60	**79**
**2** WCAA Giants	65	76	79	**62**	74

Source: Eurobasket

== Statistical leaders ==
Category	Player	Team	Statistics
Points per game	(United States) Danny Gibson	Zorg en Zekerheid Leiden	18.8
Rebounds per game	(Netherlands) Patrick Hilliman	Rotterdam Challengers	10.1
Assists per game	(United States) Torey Thomas	Matrixx Magixx	7.2
Steals per game	(United States) Torey Thomas	Matrixx Magixx	2.9
Blocks per game	(United States) James Hughes	Matrixx Magixx	1.7

== Awards ==
Most Valuable Player

- (United States) Danny Gibson (Zorg en Zekerheid Leiden)

All-Star Team

- (United States) Danny Gibson (Zorg en Zekerheid Leiden)
- (United States) Ronny LeMelle (Zorg en Zekerheid Leiden)
- (Netherlands) Kees Akerboom, Jr. (EiffelTowers Den Bosch)
- (Netherlands) Patrick Hilliman (Rotterdam Challengers)
- (United States) Matt Haryasz (GasTerra Flames)

Rookie of the Year

- (Netherlands) Mohamed Kherrazi (ABC Amsterdam)

Coach of the Year

- (Netherlands) Toon van Helfteren (Zorg en Zekerheid Leiden)

Statistical Player of the Year

- (United States) Elijah Palmer (Upstairs Weert)

== In European competitions ==
Club	Competition	Result	W–L	Ref
ABC Amsterdam	EuroChallenge	Regular season	0–6	
EiffelTowers Den Bosch	EuroChallenge	Last 16	6–6	
