= Chase Ross =

American basketball player (born 2003)

No. 2 – Coachella Valley Lakers
- Position: Point guard / shooting guard
- League: NBA G League

Personal information
- Born: February 7, 2003 (age 23) Dallas, Texas, U.S.
- Listed height: 6 ft 5 in (1.96 m)
- Listed weight: 210 lb (95 kg)

Career information
- High school: Cushing Academy (Ashburnham, Massachusetts)
- College: Marquette (2022–2026)
- NBA draft: 2026: undrafted
- Playing career: 2026–present

Career history
- 2026–present: Coachella Valley Lakers

Career highlights
- Big East All-Defensive team (2026)
- Stats at NBA.com
- Stats at Basketball Reference

Chase Ross is an American basketball player for the Coachella Valley Lakers of the NBA G League. He played college basketball for the Marquette Golden Eagles of the Big East Conference.

== Early life and high school ==
Coming out of high school, Ross held offers from schools such as Arizona State, Marquette, Mississippi State, Virginia Tech, Georgia, Rutgers, and Texas A&M. Ultimately, Ross committed to play college basketball for the Marquette Golden Eagles.

== College career ==
As a freshman in 2022-23, Ross averaged 4.6 points, 1.7 rebounds, and 1.1 steals in 36 games. On December 6, 2023, he notched 12 points in a win over Texas. On January 6, 2024, Ross suffered a dislocated shoulder in a loss to Seton Hall, which caused him to miss the next five games. In the second round of the 2024 NCAA Division I men's basketball tournament, he notched 12 points, five rebounds, two steals, and two blocks, as he helped his team advance beating Colorado. In the 2023-24 season, Ross played in 32 games with ten starts, where he averaged 6.1 points, 3.1 rebounds, and 1.3 steals per game. On November 4, 2024, he totaled 23 points and eight rebounds in a season-opening win over Stony Brook. On December 4, Ross scored just two points before leaving with an ankle injury in a loss to Iowa State. On January 7, 2025, he notched 27 points in a win versus Georgetown.

== Professional career ==
On September 18, 2026, Ross signed an Exhibit 10 contract with the Los Angeles Lakers.
