= Terry Rand =

American basketball player (1934–2014)

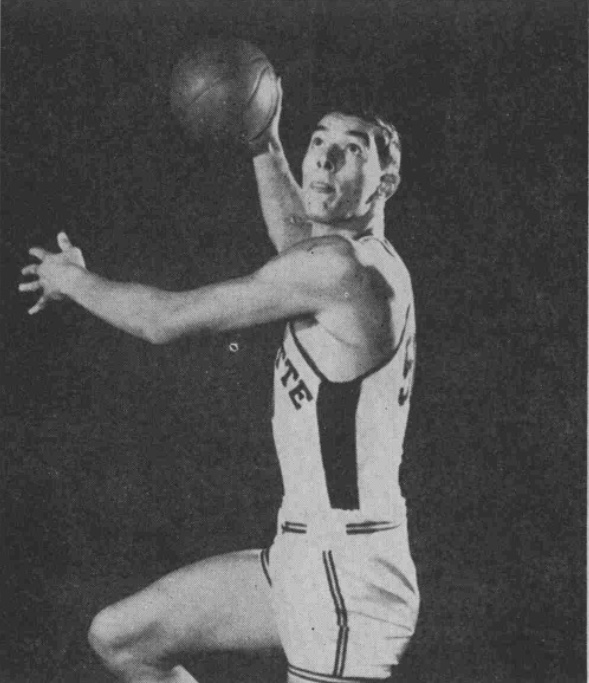
- Rand from the 1956 Hilltop

Personal information
- Born: November 17, 1934 Two Rivers, Wisconsin, U.S.
- Died: February 27, 2014 (aged 79) Naples, Florida, U.S.
- Listed height: 6 ft 9 in (2.06 m)
- Listed weight: 220 lb (100 kg)

Career information
- High school: East (Green Bay, Wisconsin)
- College: Marquette (1953–1956)
- NBA draft: 1956: 2nd round, 10th overall pick
- Drafted by: Minneapolis Lakers
- Position: Center
- Number: 15

Career history
- 1956–1961: Denver-Chicago Truckers

Career highlights
- AAU All-American (1956); AP honorable mention All-American (1956)
- Stats at Basketball Reference

Lynwood Terry Rand (November 17, 1934 – February 27, 2014) was an American basketball player, best known for his college career at Marquette University. Despite being drafted in the second round of the 1954 NBA draft, he never played in the NBA, instead choosing to play in the National Industrial Basketball League for six years. After retiring from basketball, he worked as a stockbroker with Rand Financial Advisors.

== Early life ==
Rand was named Lynwood Terry Rand after Detroit Tigers pitcher Lynwood "Schoolboy" Rowe, who was pitching in the 1934 World Series when Rand was born. He grew up as a swimmer in Green Bay, Wisconsin, and did not play basketball until his freshman year of high school, when he stood 6–2. He did not make Green Bay East's varsity squad until his junior season and played only 13 games due to an illness. Nonetheless, he averaged 28.7 points per game and was named to the all-Fox River Valley Conference team. He repeated as an all-Fox River Valley selection as a senior, where he scored a total of 570 points, which is the school's single-season scoring record. He scored in excess of 30 points on seven occasions, and twice scored 40 points.

== College career ==
Rand played college basketball at Marquette University and led the team in scoring as a sophomore, junior, and senior. As a junior, he helped lead the Golden Warriors to a 24–3 record and its first NCAA tournament appearance. The team carried a 22-game winning streak and was ranked eighth in the nation. In the first round, Rand scored 37 points and grabbed 25 rebounds in a 97–70 victory over Miami (Ohio), which still stands as the school tournament record. Marquette reached the Elite Eight after defeating Kentucky, before losing to Iowa.

In his senior season, Rand posted averages of 20.3 points and 13.1 rebounds per game for a team that compiled a 13–11 record. He scored 43 points in a game against Duquesne in 1956. After the season, he was a National Association of Basketball Coaches third-team All-American and All-Catholic All-American. In three years at Marquette, Rand scored 1,309 points and grabbed 978 rebounds, which remains second in school history behind Don Kojis. According to Bill Russell, "Rand is far and away the best center I've faced in three years of college ball."

== Professional career ==
In the 1956 NBA draft, the Minneapolis Lakers selected Rand in the second round with the 10th overall pick. The Lakers offered him a starting salary of $15,000, but Rand declined because the team's finances were a wreck. Instead, he signed with the Denver Truckers of the semi-professional National Industrial Basketball League. The Truckers paid him $12,000 a year in addition to tuition to attend the law school at the University of Denver. Despite not being an amateur, Rand was one of four alternates on the 1956 U.S. Olympic team. He was not considered fully professional because NIBL players were employees of the parent company.

He played six seasons in the NIBL for the Truckers, where he was coached by John Dee. Rand led the NIBL in scoring and rebounding as a rookie. He averaged 20.3 points per game that year en route to being named an All-Star, rookie of the year, and most valuable player. In 1958, he played on the U.S. All-Star team which toured Russia.

== Later life and death ==
Rand did not graduate from the University of Denver law school because he had a hectic travel schedule with the NIBL. He did receive a bachelor of business finance from Denver and became a stockbroker in 1958. He moved to Naples, Florida, after visiting it to survey a piece of land his father owned in the early 1990s. Shortly thereafter, he got a job at a Florida firm and eventually founded Rand Financial Advisors. In 1994, Rand was inducted into the Marquette Athletic Hall of Fame.

He was an enthusiastic harmonica player, beginning when he was a child trying to play along with his grandfather's Cajun band. In addition to the musical aspect of harmonica playing, he was a proponent of its health benefits and gave away over 400 harmonicas to his colleagues. "I think the perfect workout would be playing the harmonica while walking on a treadmill", Rand said. He joined the Society for the Preservation and Advancement of the Harmonica in order to counteract the perceived decline of the instrument. According to society president Tom Stryker, Rand brought noticeable attention to the society when he was featured in a front page Wall Street Journal article in 2006.

Rand died on February 27, 2014, at Naples Community Hospital in Naples at the age of 79. The stated cause of death was cardiac arrest resulting from complications from surgery he underwent the week before. He is survived by his wife Beth and three children: Greg, Kevin, and Jennifer.
