= Allie McGuire =

American basketball player

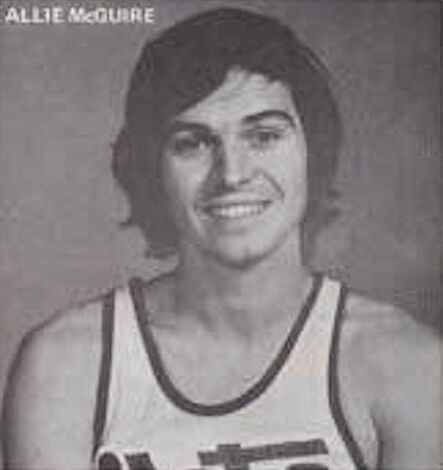
- McGuire with the Allentown Jets in 1973

Personal information
- Born: July 10, 1951 (age 75) New York City, New York, U.S.
- Listed height: 6 ft 3 in (1.91 m)
- Listed weight: 175 lb (79 kg)

Career information
- High school: Marquette University HS (Milwaukee, Wisconsin)
- College: Marquette (1970–1973)
- NBA draft: 1973: 3rd round, 49th overall pick
- Drafted by: New York Knicks
- Playing career: 1973–1974
- Position: Shooting guard
- Number: 16

Career history
- 1973: New York Knicks
- 1973–1974: Allentown Jets
- Stats at NBA.com
- Stats at Basketball Reference

Alfred C. "Allie" McGuire (born July 10, 1951) is an American former basketball player in the National Basketball Association (NBA). He was drafted in the third round of the 1973 NBA draft by the New York Knicks and played with the team that year.

McGuire is the son of Al McGuire and nephew of Dick McGuire. He appeared on the cover of Sports Illustrated in February 1972. McGuire played at the collegiate level with the then-Marquette Warriors.

McGuire played for the Allentown Jets of the Eastern Basketball Association (EBA) during the 1973–74 season.

== Career statistics ==
Legend
GP	Games played	GS	Games started	MPG	Minutes per game
FG%	Field goal percentage	3P%	3-point field goal percentage	FT%	Free throw percentage
RPG	Rebounds per game	APG	Assists per game	SPG	Steals per game
BPG	Blocks per game	PPG	Points per game	**Bold**	Career high

=== NBA ===
==== Regular season ====
Year	Team	GP	GS	MPG	FG%	FT%	RPG	APG	SPG	BPG	PPG
1973–74	New York	2	0	5.0	.500	–	1.0	.5	.0	.0	2.0
