= Luke Fischer =

American basketball player

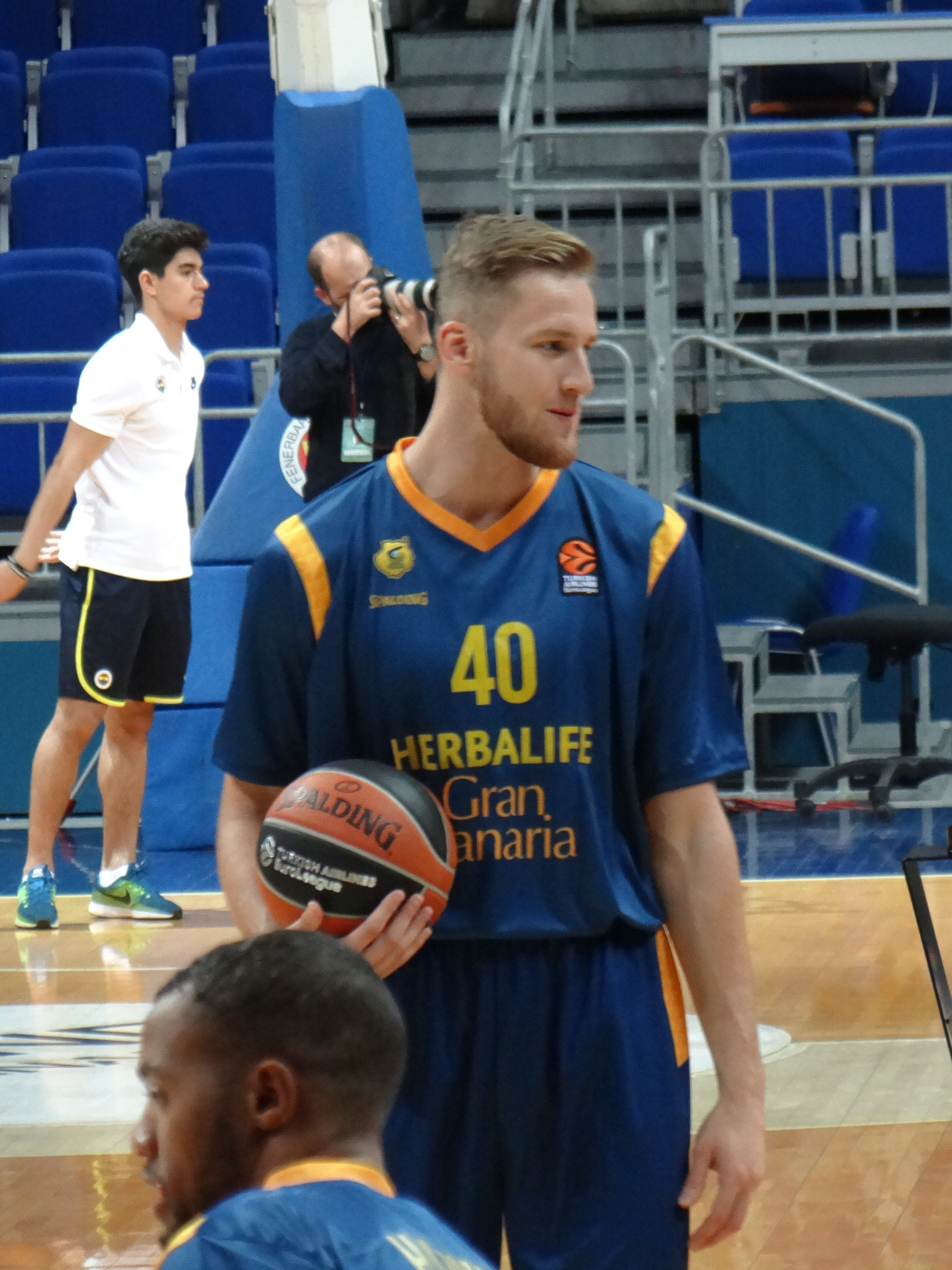
- Fischer with Gran Canaria in 2018

No. 40 – Gran Canaria
- Position: Center
- League: Primera FEB

Personal information
- Born: October 29, 1994 (age 32) Milwaukee, Wisconsin, U.S.
- Listed height: 6 ft 11 in (2.11 m)
- Listed weight: 259 lb (117 kg)

Career information
- High school: Germantown (Germantown, Wisconsin)
- College: Indiana (2013–2014); Marquette (2014–2017)
- NBA draft: 2017: undrafted
- Playing career: 2017–present

Career history
- 2017–2019: Herbalife Gran Canaria
- 2019–2020: s.Oliver Würzburg
- 2020–2021: Orléans Loiret Basket
- 2021–2022: Nanterre 92
- 2022–2023: SLUC Nancy Basket
- 2023: Real Betis
- 2023–2026: San Pablo Burgos
- 2026–present: Gran Canaria

Career highlights
- First-team Parade All-American (2013); Wisconsin Mr. Basketball (2013)

Lucas James Fischer (born October 29, 1994) is an American basketball player who last played for Gran Canaria of the Spanish Primera FEB and the Armenian national basketball team. He played college basketball for Indiana University and Marquette University.

== College career ==
As a high school player at Germantown High School, Fischer was named Wisconsin Mr. Basketball, Gatorade state player of the year, and a Parade All-American. Fischer originally chose college basketball power Indiana. He played 13 games for the Hoosiers, averaging 2.8 points and 2.1 rebounds per game. He decided to transfer after the first semester his freshman year, ultimately choosing Marquette. Fischer was a significant player for the Golden Eagles, averaging 10.3 points and 5.1 rebounds in 24.8 minutes per game over his three-year career.

== Professional career ==
After going undrafted in the 2017 NBA draft, Fischer signed his first professional contract with Herbalife Gran Canaria in Spain's Liga ACB and EuroCup competition. Fischer averaged 5.0 points per game, 0.6 assists per game and 2.3 points per game his first seasons with Herbalife. During his seconds season Fischer averaged 3.1 points per game and 2.3 rebounds per game.

On August 12, 2019, he has signed with s.Oliver Würzburg of the German Basketball Bundesliga. Fischer averaged 12.9 points per game, 2.2 assists per game and 5.8 rebounds per game during the 2019–20 season.

On July 17, 2020, he has signed with Orléans Loiret Basket of the French Pro A. Fischer averaged 12.5 points and 5.7 rebounds per game. On July 18, 2021, he signed with Nanterre 92.

On July 25, 2022, he has signed with SLUC Nancy Basket of the French Pro A.

On January 1, 2023, he signed with Real Betis of the Liga ACB.

On July 8, 2026, Fischer signed with Gran Canaria of the Primera FEB, returning to the team after previously playing for them between 2017 and 2019.

== National team career ==
In the summer of 2017, Fischer played for the Armenia national basketball team in the 2019 FIBA World Cup pre-qualifiers.

== Personal life ==
Fischer proposed to his girlfriend, Payton Brock, on his senior night at Marquette on March 4, 2017. They married on August 4, 2018. In 2019 the couple had a daughter, and in 2021 they had a son.

== See also ==
- Golden Eagles (TBT)
