= Lloyd Walton =

American basketball player

Personal information
- Born: November 23, 1953 (age 72) Chicago, Illinois, U.S
- Listed height: 6 ft 1 in (1.85 m)
- Listed weight: 160 lb (73 kg)

Career information
- High school: Mount Carmel (Chicago, Illinois)
- College: Moberly Area CC (1971–1972); Marquette (1973–1976)
- NBA draft: 1976: 3rd round, 40th overall pick
- Drafted by: Milwaukee Bucks
- Playing career: 1976–1981
- Position: Point guard
- Number: 11, 12

Career history
- 1976–1980: Milwaukee Bucks
- 1980–1981: Kansas City Kings

Career highlights
- Fourth-team Parade All-American (1971)

Career NBA statistics
- Points: 1,443 (4.2 ppg)
- Rebounds: 370 (1.1 rpg)
- Assists: 1,243 (3.6 apg)
- Stats at NBA.com
- Stats at Basketball Reference

Lloyd Walton (born November 23, 1953) is an American former basketball player. He grew up in Chicago Heights, Illinois and played basketball for Mount Carmel High School, where he was named a Parade Magazine All American, and Marquette University, playing for legendary Marquette coach Al McGuire, named 2nd team All American. Walton, a 6'1' (1.83 m) point guard, was drafted by the Milwaukee Bucks in 1976 and played for the Bucks from 1976 to 1980, and for the Kansas City Kings in 1980–81.

Since retiring as a player, he has served in various volunteer and professional capacities related to prep, collegiate and professional basketball, including: Assistant Coach under Rick Majerus at Marquette University, a Regional Collegiate Scout for the New York Knicks, Assistant Coach for the LaCrosse Bobcats of the Continental League, and Assistant Coach at the NBA Pre-Draft. He has also held several positions in the public sector, including Bureau Chief for the Illinois Department of Human Services and Executive Director of both The James Jordan Boys & Girls Club & Family Life Center and the Washington Park YMCA both in Chicago.

Lloyd is currently senior career counselor for the National Basketball Players Association, where he has logged over 2,000 counseling hours with NBA players. In 2009, he created Life Long Winners LLC Consulting. The Company is designed specifically for servicing Athletes with Life Coaching, Transition Planning, Motivational Speaking, and the Life Long Winners personal development model. Lloyd received his Doctoral Degree in Organizational Leadership from Argosy University in 2015, which makes him only the third player in NBA history to achieve this level of education. In 2018 Lloyd became a certified life coach from World Coach Institute.

== Career statistics ==
Legend
GP	Games played	GS	Games started	MPG	Minutes per game
FG%	Field goal percentage	3P%	3-point field goal percentage	FT%	Free throw percentage
RPG	Rebounds per game	APG	Assists per game	SPG	Steals per game
BPG	Blocks per game	PPG	Points per game	**Bold**	Career high

=== NBA ===
==== Regular season ====
Year	Team	GP	GS	MPG	FG%	3P%	FT%	RPG	APG	SPG	BPG	PPG
1976–77	Milwaukee	53	–	12.8	.468	–	**.815**	1.0	2.7	0.8	0.0	4.3
1977–78	Milwaukee	**76**	–	16.6	.448	–	.651	1.0	3.3	**1.0**	**0.2**	4.8
1978–79	Milwaukee	75	–	**18.4**	**.480**	–	.678	**1.4**	**4.7**	**1.0**	0.1	**5.0**
1979–80	Milwaukee	**76**	–	16.4	.455	**.333**	.690	1.2	3.8	0.6	0.0	3.6
1980–81	Kansas City	61	–	13.5	.413	.000	.788	0.8	3.4	0.5	0.0	3.4
Career		341	–	15.8	.454	.250	.711	1.1	3.6	0.8	0.1	4.2

==== Playoffs ====
Year	Team	GP	GS	MPG	FG%	3P%	FT%	RPG	APG	SPG	BPG	PPG
1977–78	Milwaukee	**9**	–	**13.8**	**.486**	–	.615	0.4	**4.1**	**0.9**	0.3	**4.7**
1979–80	Milwaukee	1	–	4.0	.000	.000	.000	**1.0**	1.0	0.0	**1.0**	0.0
1980–81	Kansas City	8	–	9.1	.267	.000	**.750**	0.9	2.4	0.5	0.0	1.4
Career		18	–	11.2	.412	.000	.647	0.7	3.2	0.7	0.2	2.9

=== College ===
Year	Team	GP	GS	MPG	FG%	3P%	FT%	RPG	APG	SPG	BPG	PPG
1973–74	Marquette	**31**	–	–	.422	–	.783	2.5	4.5	–	–	9.4
1974–75	Marquette	27	–	–	**.455**	–	**.789**	**2.7**	5.9	–	–	**15.1**
1975–76	Marquette	29	–	**36.3**	.425	–	**.789**	2.4	**6.3**	–	–	10.6
Career		87	–	36.3	.436	–	.787	2.6	5.5	–	–	11.6
