= Chris Otule =

American-Nigerian basketball player

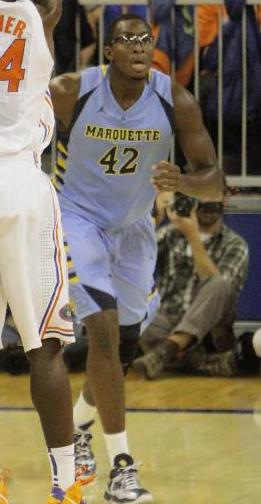

Free agent
- Position: Center

Personal information
- Born: January 4, 1990 (age 36) Houston, Texas, U.S.
- Listed height: 211 cm (6 ft 11 in)
- Listed weight: 125 kg (276 lb)

Career information
- High school: Bush (Richmond, Texas)
- College: Marquette (2008–2014)
- NBA draft: 2014: undrafted
- Playing career: 2014–present

Career history
- 2014–2015: Crailsheim Merlins
- 2015–2016: Mitteldeutscher BC
- 2016–2017: Antibes Sharks
- 2017: Henan Shedianlaojiu
- 2017: Strasbourg IG
- 2017–2019: BCM Gravelines
- 2019: Guizhou Guwutang Tea
- 2019–2020: SeaHorses Mikawa
- 2020: Toyotsu Fighting Eagles Nagoya

Christopher Otule (born January 4, 1990) is an American-Nigerian professional basketball player for BCM Gravelines of the LNB Pro A. He played college basketball at Marquette University.

Otule played six years at Marquette, four as an opening game starter. Chris went undrafted in the 2014 NBA draft and after that went on to play professionally overseas, starting in Germany.
