= Bo Ellis =

American basketball player and coach

Personal information
- Born: August 8, 1954 (age 72) Chicago, Illinois, U.S.
- Listed height: 6 ft 9 in (2.06 m)
- Listed weight: 197 lb (89 kg)

Career information
- High school: Parker (Chicago, Illinois)
- College: Marquette (1973–1977)
- NBA draft: 1977: 1st round, 17th overall pick
- Drafted by: Washington Bullets
- Playing career: 1977–1983
- Position: Power forward
- Number: 31

Career history

Playing
- 1977–1980: Denver Nuggets
- 1981–1982: Maine Lumberjacks
- 1983: Sarasota Stingers

Coaching
- 1987–1988: Collins Academy HS (assistant)
- 1988–1998: Marquette (assistant)
- 1998–2003: Chicago State

Career highlights
- NCAA champion (1977); Second-team All-American – NABC (1977); Third-team All-American – AP (1977); No. 31 retired by Marquette Golden Eagles; First-team Parade All-American (1973)
- Stats at NBA.com
- Stats at Basketball Reference

Maurice H. "Bo" Ellis (born August 8, 1954) is an American former professional basketball player.

After graduating from Chicago's Parker High School, Ellis, a 6-9 forward, played college basketball for the Marquette Warriors (nowadays the Golden Eagles) and won an NCAA championship in 1977. An art major in college he received by going to class at Mount Mary College Fashion Design Program, Ellis created several different uniform designs worn by his team during the 1977 season.

After graduating, he played three seasons of professional basketball for the Denver Nuggets of the NBA, averaging 3.6 points per game. He later held coaching positions at Marquette and Chicago State University, and worked with the Chicago Public Schools' athletics administration.

== Career statistics ==
Legend
GP	Games played	GS	Games started	MPG	Minutes per game
FG%	Field goal percentage	3P%	3-point field goal percentage	FT%	Free throw percentage
RPG	Rebounds per game	APG	Assists per game	SPG	Steals per game
BPG	Blocks per game	PPG	Points per game	**Bold**	Career high

=== NBA ===
==== Regular season ====
Year	Team	GP	MPG	FG%	3P%	FT%	RPG	APG	SPG	BPG	PPG
1977–78	Denver	**78**	**15.6**	.416		.692	**3.9**	**.9**	**.6**	**.6**	**4.3**
1978–79	Denver	42	6.4	**.457**		**.806**	1.5	.2	.2	.3	2.7
1979–80	Denver	48	10.5	.449	.000	.755	2.4	.6	.2	.5	3.4
Career		168	11.8	.431	.000	.731	2.9	.7	.4	.5	3.6

==== Playoffs ====
Year	Team	GP	MPG	FG%	FT%	RPG	APG	SPG	BPG	PPG
1978	Denver	**12**	**14.2**	**.425**	.800	**3.6**	**.7**	.5	**.7**	**3.8**
1979	Denver	3	8.0	.333	**1.000**	1.3	.3	**.7**	.3	2.0
Career		15	12.9	.413	.824	3.1	.6	.5	.6	3.5

== Head coaching record ==
Record table
Season	Team	Overall	Conference	Standing	Postseason
**Chicago State Cougars** (Mid-Continent Conference) (1998–2003)
1998–99	Chicago State	3–24	3–11	T–7th	
1999–00	Chicago State	10–18	7–9	7th	
2000–01	Chicago State	5–22	2–14	9th	
2001–02	Chicago State	2–26	0–14	8th	
2002–03	Chicago State	3–15*	0–2*	8th*	
Chicago State:		23–105	12–50	(*) Indicates record/standing at time of resignation from Chicago State.	
Total:		23–105			
National champion Postseason invitational champion Conference regular season champion Conference regular season and conference tournament champion Division regular season champion Division regular season and conference tournament champion Conference tournament champion
