= Tony Smith (basketball) =

American basketball player (born 1968)

Personal information
- Born: June 14, 1968 (age 58) Wauwatosa, Wisconsin, U.S.
- Listed height: 6 ft 3 in (1.91 m)
- Listed weight: 185 lb (84 kg)

Career information
- High school: Wauwatosa East (Wauwatosa, Wisconsin)
- College: Marquette (1986–1990)
- NBA draft: 1990: 2nd round, 51st overall pick
- Drafted by: Los Angeles Lakers
- Playing career: 1990–2002
- Position: Shooting guard / point guard
- Number: 34, 14, 9

Career history
- 1990–1995: Los Angeles Lakers
- 1995–1996: Phoenix Suns
- 1996: Miami Heat
- 1996–1997: Charlotte Hornets
- 1997: Tau Cerámica
- 1997–1998: Milwaukee Bucks
- 2000–2001: Rockford Lightning
- 2001: Atlanta Hawks
- 2001: Vip Rimini
- 2001: San Lázaro
- 2002: Phoenix Eclipse

Career NBA statistics
- Points: 2,504 (5.5 ppg)
- Rebounds: 735 (1.6 rpg)
- Assists: 881 (1.9 apg)
- Stats at NBA.com
- Stats at Basketball Reference

Charles Anton Smith (born June 14, 1968) is an American former professional basketball player who played nine seasons in the National Basketball Association (NBA).

Smith began his career playing high school basketball at Wauwatosa East High School. He then played basketball at the collegiate level for Marquette University from 1986 to 1990. During his time at Marquette, he set the school’s all-time record for points per game (23.8), which he achieved during the 1989–90 season. Smith's scoring record was eclipsed by Markus Howard in the 2018–19 season. Smith graduated with a degree in Mechanical Engineering and Organizational Leadership. He was inducted into Marquette's Hall of Fame in September 2006.

He was selected with the 24th pick of the 2nd round in the 1990 NBA draft by the Los Angeles Lakers and played his first five seasons with the Lakers. He then played with five different NBA teams from 1995 to 2001, and last played in 2002 with the Phoenix Eclipse of the American Basketball Association.

In 2016, Smith began working as an analyst and studio host for broadcasts of Milwaukee Bucks basketball on FanDuel Sports Network Wisconsin. In 2018, Smith became the radio color analyst for Marquette University Basketball. Then, in June 2019, Smith was named an on-air personality for WKTI-FM in Milwaukee.

== Career statistics ==
Legend
GP	Games played	GS	Games started	MPG	Minutes per game
FG%	Field goal percentage	3P%	3-point field goal percentage	FT%	Free throw percentage
RPG	Rebounds per game	APG	Assists per game	SPG	Steals per game
BPG	Blocks per game	PPG	Points per game	**Bold**	Career high

=== NBA ===
==== Regular season ====
Year	Team	GP	GS	MPG	FG%	3P%	FT%	RPG	APG	SPG	BPG	PPG
1990–91	L. A. Lakers	64	1	10.9	.441	.000	.702	1.1	2.1	0.4	0.2	3.7
1991–92	L. A. Lakers	63	0	13.0	.399	.000	.653	1.2	1.7	0.6	0.1	4.4
1992–93	L. A. Lakers	55	9	13.7	**.484**	.182	**.756**	1.6	1.1	0.9	0.1	6.0
1993–94	L. A. Lakers	**73**	31	**22.2**	.441	.320	.714	**2.7**	2.0	0.8	0.2	**8.8**
1994–95	L. A. Lakers	61	4	16.8	.427	**.352**	.698	1.8	1.7	0.8	0.1	5.6
1995–96	Phoenix	34	2	15.5	.405	.325	.649	1.6	2.5	0.6	0.1	5.6
1995–96	Miami	25	1	16.4	.455	.333	.444	1.6	**2.7**	0.6	0.2	4.4
1996–97	Charlotte	69	**39**	18.7	.409	.323	.644	1.4	2.2	0.7	**0.3**	5.0
1997–98	Milwaukee	7	0	11.4	.333	.000	.750	1.0	1.4	0.7	**0.3**	2.7
2000–01	Atlanta	6	0	13.0	.348	.000	.500	0.5	1.7	**1.2**	0.0	2.8
Career		457	87	16.0	.431	.307	.690	1.6	1.9	0.7	0.2	5.5

==== Playoffs ====
Year	Team	GP	GS	MPG	FG%	3P%	FT%	RPG	APG	SPG	BPG	PPG
1990–91	L. A. Lakers	**7**	0	5.7	.462	.000	**.667**	0.4	0.3	0.1	0.0	2.0
1991–92	L. A. Lakers	4	0	10.0	.300	.000	.500	0.5	1.3	1.0	0.0	1.8
1992–93	L. A. Lakers	5	0	14.6	**.520**	**.500**	**.667**	**1.6**	0.4	0.2	**0.2**	6.8
1994–95	L. A. Lakers	6	0	4.5	.231	.300	.000	0.5	0.5	0.0	0.0	1.5
1995–96	Miami	3	0	**20.3**	.474	.400	.000	1.3	**2.7**	**1.3**	0.0	**7.3**
1996–97	Charlotte	2	0	4.5	.000	.000	.500	0.5	1.0	0.5	0.0	0.5
Career		27	0	9.3	.420	.333	.556	0.8	0.8	0.4	0.0	3.2

=== College ===
Year	Team	GP	GS	MPG	FG%	3P%	FT%	RPG	APG	SPG	BPG	PPG
1986–87	Marquette	**29**	24	24.9	.534	.333	.753	3.3	2.1	1.4	0.4	8.0
1987–88	Marquette	28	-	31.9	.523	.368	.739	4.5	2.9	**1.9**	**0.6**	13.1
1988–89	Marquette	28	**28**	32.4	**.556**	**.667**	.730	3.9	5.6	1.6	0.4	14.2
1989–90	Marquette	**29**	-	**39.0**	.495	.414	**.856**	**4.7**	**5.8**	1.8	**0.6**	**23.8**
Career		114	52	32.4	.521	.430	.785	4.1	4.1	1.7	0.5	14.8
