= Jim McIlvaine =

American basketball player (born 1972)

Personal information
- Born: July 30, 1972 (age 54) Racine, Wisconsin, U.S.
- Listed height: 7 ft 1 in (2.16 m)
- Listed weight: 240 lb (109 kg)

Career information
- High school: St. Catherine (Racine, Wisconsin)
- College: Marquette (1990–1994)
- NBA draft: 1994: 2nd round, 32nd overall pick
- Drafted by: Washington Bullets
- Playing career: 1994–2001
- Position: Center
- Number: 22

Career history
- 1994–1996: Washington Bullets
- 1996–1998: Seattle SuperSonics
- 1999–2001: New Jersey Nets

Career highlights
- NABC Defensive Player of the Year (1994); Great Midwest Player of the Year (1994); First-team All-Great Midwest (1994)

Career NBA statistics
- Points: 1,072 (2.7 ppg)
- Rebounds: 1,243 (3.1 rpg)
- Blocks: 691 (1.7 bpg)
- Stats at NBA.com
- Stats at Basketball Reference

James Michael McIlvaine (born July 30, 1972) is an American former professional basketball player who spent seven seasons in the National Basketball Association (NBA) with the Washington Bullets, Seattle SuperSonics, and New Jersey Nets. The 7-foot-1 shot-blocking specialist is perhaps best remembered for the fall-out that occurred after he signed with the Seattle SuperSonics in 1996.

McIlvaine is married to Gwendolyn, a 6'7" center of the University of North Carolina's 1994 championship women's basketball team. He is former radio color analyst for Marquette men's basketball and is part of the online support staffer for Optima Batteries in Milwaukee.

== NBA career ==
=== Early career ===
After playing at St. Catherine's High School in Racine (averaging 22.9 points, 11.1 rebounds and 8.1 blocked shots as a senior) and blocking a school-record 399 shots at Marquette University, McIlvaine was named NABC Defensive Player of the Year and was drafted with the fifth pick in the second round of the 1994 draft by the Washington Bullets (now Washington Wizards). He spent two years with the team, primarily in a backup role to Gheorghe Mureșan. In limited playing time, McIlvaine averaged fewer than 15 minutes a game during his second year. In 1996, McIlvaine entered free agency.

=== Seattle SuperSonics signing ===
In 1996, the Sonics offered a seven-year, $33.6 million free-agent contract to McIlvaine. Seattle fans were upset, and so was superstar forward Shawn Kemp, who had been asking for a contract increase after leading the team to a franchise-record 64 wins and its best postseason performance in 17 years, including the third Finals appearance in franchise history. But because Kemp signed a contract extension in 1994, the NBA's collective bargaining agreement (CBA) forbid any changes to that contract until October 1997.

McIlvaine was a member of the Sonics when they won their division in each of his two years with the team. Following the 1997 season, Seattle was involved in a three-team trade that sent Kemp to the Cleveland Cavaliers in exchange for the Milwaukee Bucks' Vin Baker, with the Cavaliers' Terrell Brandon and Tyrone Hill going to Milwaukee.

=== Final years ===
In his first season in Seattle, McIlvaine registered career highs in games (82), minutes (1,477), points per game (3.8), rebounds per game (4.0), and steals (0.5), while also averaging two blocks per game. His second season in Seattle saw him decline in every major statistical category, although he still posted numbers close to his career bests in most areas. Eventually, McIlvaine was dealt to New Jersey in 1999 for Don MacLean and Michael Cage, primarily to open up salary cap room.

McIlvaine rounded out his career with the Nets, playing three injury-riddled seasons with the team. In 1999–2000, McIlvaine played 66 games in his best season since leaving Seattle, but injury problems and declining numbers continued to hamper him until his contract was bought out by the Nets after the 2000–01 NBA season. McIlvaine retired with an average of 2.7 points, 3.1 rebounds, and 1.71 blocks in 401 career games.

== Career statistics ==
Legend
GP	Games played	GS	Games started	MPG	Minutes per game
FG%	Field goal percentage	3P%	3-point field goal percentage	FT%	Free throw percentage
RPG	Rebounds per game	APG	Assists per game	SPG	Steals per game
BPG	Blocks per game	PPG	Points per game	**Bold**	Career high

=== NBA ===
==== Regular season ====
Year	Team	GP	GS	MPG	FG%	3P%	FT%	RPG	APG	SPG	BPG	PPG
1994–95	Washington	55	0	9.7	**.479**	–	**.683**	1.9	.2	.2	1.1	1.7
1995–96	Washington	80	6	14.9	.428	–	.552	2.9	.1	.3	**2.1**	2.3
1996–97	Seattle	**82**	**79**	**18.0**	.471	**.143**	.495	**4.0**	.3	**.5**	2.0	**3.8**
1997–98	Seattle	78	72	15.5	.453	.000	.556	3.3	.2	.3	1.8	3.2
1998–99	New Jersey	22	1	12.2	.431	–	.667	2.5	.1	.4	1.5	2.2
1999–00	New Jersey	66	53	15.9	.416	–	.518	3.5	**.5**	.4	1.8	2.4
2000–01	New Jersey	18	3	10.7	.357	–	.667	1.9	.2	.4	.8	1.6
Career		401	214	14.8	.446	.100	.551	3.1	.3	.3	1.7	2.7

==== Playoffs ====
Year	Team	GP	GS	MPG	FG%	3P%	FT%	RPG	APG	SPG	BPG	PPG
1997	Seattle	5	0	5.6	**.571**	–	.500	.4	.0	.2	.4	1.8
1998	Seattle	**6**	**4**	**9.8**	.300	.000	.500	**1.7**	**.2**	**.3**	**1.0**	**2.2**
Career		11	4	7.9	.370	.000	.500	1.1	.1	.3	.7	2.0

=== College ===
*	Led Great Midwest Conference

Year	Team	GP	GS	MPG	FG%	3P%	FT%	RPG	APG	SPG	BPG	PPG
1990–91	Marquette	28		19.3	**.579**	–	.598	4.7	.5	**.3**	3.3*	8.0
1991–92	Marquette	29	27	24.0	.545	–	**.754**	4.6	.6	.2	3.0*	10.3
1992–93	Marquette	28		19.0	.578	–	.714	4.8	.8	.2	2.8*	11.0
1993–94	Marquette	**33***	**33***	**28.7**	.528	–	.665	**8.3**	**1.3**	**.3**	**4.3***	**13.6**
Career		118	60	23.0	.552	–	.687	5.7	.8	.2	3.4	10.8

== See also ==
- List of NCAA Division I men's basketball career blocks leaders
- List of NCAA Division I men's basketball players with 13 or more blocks in a game
