= Tony Miller (basketball) =

American basketball coach and player

Personal information
- Born: April 16, 1973 (age 53) Cleveland, Ohio, U.S.
- Listed height: 6 ft 0 in (1.83 m)
- Listed weight: 189 lb (86 kg)

Career information
- High school: VASJ (Cleveland, Ohio)
- College: Marquette (1991–1995)
- NBA draft: 1995: undrafted
- Playing career: 1995–2008
- Position: Point guard
- Coaching career: 2010–2016

Career history

Playing
- 1995–1996: Atlanta Trojans
- 1996-1997: Žalgiris Kaunas
- 1997–1998: Den Helder
- 1998–2000: Power Wevelgem
- 2000–2001: Den Helder
- 2001–2002: Amsterdam Astronauts
- 2002–2003: Bree
- 2003–2004: Amsterdam Astronauts
- 2004–2005: Den Helder
- 2005–2007: Omniworld Almere
- 2007–2008: Everton Tigers

Coaching
- 2010–2013: USC (assistant)
- 2013–2014: St. John Bosco HS (assistant)
- 2014–2016: Cal State Los Angeles (assistant)

Career highlights
- Dutch League champion (1998); 3× Dutch League assists leader (1997, 1998, 2005); 2× Dutch League All-Star (1998, 2000); 3× Second-team All-Great Midwest (1993–1995)

Anthony DeMond Miller (born April 16, 1973) is an American former basketball coach and player. Miller was a two-time Dutch League All-Star in 1998 and 2000. During his collegiate career at Marquette University, Miller recorded 956 assists, which as of the end of the 2024–25 season still remains the eighth-highest total in NCAA Division I history.

== Early life ==
Miller was born in Cleveland, Ohio. He attended Villa Angela-St. Joseph High School (VASJ) where he was a two-sport star between basketball and football. Miller was the starting point guard for all four seasons in basketball and led them to a state championship as a senior in 1991–92. In football, he became the starting quarterback in his sophomore season, succeeding future National Football League quarterback Elvis Grbac. Miller led the football squad to a state championship as a junior, a feat Grbac did not even accomplish. He wasn't heavily recruited from college basketball teams because it was thought he would play football at the next level instead, but then-Marquette head coach Kevin O'Neill was persistent in his recruitment, and eventually Miller signed to play for the Warriors.

== College ==
In his four-year career spanning from 1991 and 1995, Miller started all 123 games in which he played. For his career he averaged 8.3 points and 7.8 assists while finishing with 1,027 and 956, respectively. His assists total ranks eighth all-time in Division I history, and was fifth all-time when he graduated. In his sophomore and junior seasons, Miller was the catalyst for Marquette's back-to-back NCAA Tournament berths; in the 1994 tournament, he was the primary reason why Marquette was able to break Kentucky's full-court press as the Warriors upset the Wildcats to advance to the Sweet 16. As a senior, Marquette were the runners-up in the 1995 National Invitation Tournament. Miller was a three-time Great Midwest Conference Second Team selection from 1993 to 1995.

== Professional career ==
Miller played professional basketball from 1995–96 through 2007–08. In 13 seasons he played for different teams in the United States, Belgium, Lithuania, the Netherlands, and the United Kingdom. In 1997–98 and 2000–2001 he was a Dutch League All-Star. Miller finished his professional career playing in the British Basketball League for the Everton Tigers.

== Coaching career ==
Miller's first job came in 2009–10 as the strength and conditioning manager for USC. He was hired by his former head coach at Marquette, Kevin O'Neill, who was then the USC head coach. In 2010–11, Miller was promoted to a full-time assistant coach position. He was not retained when Andy Enfield took over as head coach in 2013–14. Miller spent the 2013–14 season as an assistant coach at St. John Bosco High School in Bellflower, California, where he helped the team win a Division 2 state championship. He then moved on to become an assist for Cal State Los Angeles for two seasons before retiring from coaching.

== See also ==
- List of NCAA Division I men's basketball career assists leaders
