= 1968–69 NCAA University Division men's basketball season =

Men's collegiate basketball season

- Preseason AP No. 1: UCLA Bruins
- NCAA Tournament: 1969
- Tournament dates: March 8 – 22, 1969
- National Championship: Freedom Hall; Louisville, Kentucky
- NCAA Champions: UCLA Bruins
- Helms National Champions: UCLA Bruins
- Other champions: Temple Owls (NIT)
- Player of the Year (Naismith, Wooden): Lew Alcindor, UCLA Bruins (Naismith)
- Player of the Year (Helms): Lew Alcindor, UCLA Bruins

The 1968–69 NCAA University Division men's basketball season began in December 1968, progressed through the regular season and conference tournaments, and concluded with the 1969 NCAA University Division basketball tournament championship game on March 22, 1969, at Freedom Hall in Louisville, Kentucky. The UCLA Bruins won their fifth NCAA national championship with a 92–72 victory over the Purdue Boilermakers.

== Season headlines ==
- The Associated Press (AP) Poll returned to a Top 20 format, expanding from the Top 10 format it used from the 1961–62 season through the 1967–68 season. It previously had used a Top 20 format from its inception in the 1948–49 season through the 1960–61 season.
- On December 7, 1968, Calvin Murphy of Niagara scored 68 points in a game against Syracuse, setting the record for points scored by a single player against an NCAA University Division (later NCAA Division I) opponent. His record stood until February 1970, when Pete Maravich of LSU scored 69 points in a game against Alabama.
- The NCAA tournament expanded from 23 to 25 teams.
- UCLA won its third NCAA championship in a row, fifth overall, and fifth in six seasons. In the Pacific 8 Conference, it also won its third of what ultimately would be 13 consecutive conference titles.
- The Athletic Association of Western Universities (AAWU), informally known as the "Pacific 8," formally renamed itself the Pacific 8 Conference. It became the Pacific 10 Conference in 1978 and the Pac-12 Conference in 2011.
- The Southland Conference, founded in 1963, began NCAA University Division-level play.
- The NCAA tournament's Final Four games were played on Thursday and Saturday for the first time.
- Lew Alcindor of UCLA became the first three-time NCAA basketball tournament Most Outstanding Player. He previously had been the tournament's Most Outstanding Player in 1967 and 1968.
- The Metropolitan Collegiate Conference was dissolved at the end of the season.

=== Pre-season polls ===
The Top 20 from the AP Poll and Coaches Poll during the pre-season.

Associated Press
Ranking	Team
1	UCLA
2	North Carolina
3	Kentucky
4	Notre Dame
5	Kansas
6	Davidson
7	St. Bonaventure
8	Houston
9	New Mexico
10	Purdue
11	Villanova
12	Ohio State
13	Vanderbilt
14	Cincinnati
15	Marquette
16	Western Kentucky
17	Duke
18	Detroit
19	Florida
20	Tennessee

UPI Coaches
Ranking	Team
1	UCLA
2	North Carolina
3	Kentucky
4	Notre Dame
5	Kansas
6	Houston
7	Davidson
8	New Mexico
9	Villanova
10	Cincinnati
11	Purdue
12	St. Bonaventure
13	New Mexico State
14	Ohio State
15 (tie)	Duke
15 (tie)	Western Kentucky
17	Santa Clara
18	USC
19	Florida
20	California

== Conference membership changes ==
School	Former conference	New conference
Pan American Broncs	non-NCAA University Division	NCAA University Division independent
St. Francis Terriers	Metropolitan Collegiate Conference	NCAA University Division independent
West Virginia Mountaineers	Southern Conference	NCAA University Division independent

== Regular season ==
=== Conferences ===
==== Conference winners and tournaments ====
Conference	Regular season winner	Conference player of the year	Conference tournament	Tournament venue (City)	Tournament winner
Atlantic Coast Conference	North Carolina	John Roche, South Carolina	1969 ACC men's basketball tournament	Charlotte Coliseum (Charlotte, North Carolina)	North Carolina
Big Eight Conference	Colorado	Cliff Meely, Colorado	No Tournament		
Big Sky Conference	Weber State	None selected	No Tournament		
Big Ten Conference	Purdue	None selected	No Tournament		
Ivy League	Princeton	None selected	No Tournament		
Metropolitan Collegiate Conference	Manhattan & St. Peter's		No Tournament		
Mid-American Conference	Ohio	Steve Mix, Toledo	No Tournament		
Middle Atlantic Conference	Temple		No Tournament		
Missouri Valley Conference	Drake & Louisville	Bingo Smith, Tulsa	No Tournament		
Ohio Valley Conference	Morehead State & Murray State	Claude Virden, Murray State	No Tournament		
Pacific 8 Conference	UCLA	None selected	No Tournament		
Southeastern Conference	Kentucky	Pete Maravich, LSU	No Tournament		
Southern Conference	Davidson	Mike Maloy, Davidson	1969 Southern Conference men's basketball tournament	Charlotte Coliseum (Charlotte, North Carolina)	Davidson
Southland Conference	Trinity	Larry Jeffries, Trinity	No Tournament		
Southwest Conference	Texas A&M	Ronnie Peret, Texas A&M & Greg Williams, Rice	No Tournament		
West Coast Athletic Conference	Santa Clara	Dennis Awtrey, Santa Clara	No Tournament		
Western Athletic Conference	BYU, New Mexico, & Wyoming	None selected	No Tournament		
Yankee Conference	Massachusetts	None selected	No Tournament		

==== Conference standings ====
1968–69 ACC men's basketball standings
	Conf.				Overall
Team	W		L	PCT	W		L	PCT
No. 4 North Carolina †	12	–	2	.857	27	–	5	.844
No. 13 South Carolina	11	–	3	.786	21	–	7	.750
Duke	8	–	6	.571	15	–	13	.536
NC State	8	–	6	.571	15	–	10	.600
Wake Forest	8	–	6	.571	18	–	9	.667
Virginia	5	–	9	.357	10	–	15	.400
Maryland	2	–	12	.143	8	–	18	.308
Clemson	2	–	12	.143	6	–	19	.240
† 1969 ACC tournament winner Rankings from AP Poll

1968–69 Big Eight Conference men's basketball standings
	Conf.				Overall
Team	W		L	PCT	W		L	PCT
No. 18 Colorado	10	–	4	.714	21	–	7	.750
No. 19 Kansas	9	–	5	.643	20	–	7	.741
Kansas State	9	–	5	.643	14	–	12	.538
Iowa State	8	–	6	.571	14	–	12	.538
Missouri	7	–	7	.500	14	–	11	.560
Oklahoma State	5	–	9	.357	12	–	13	.480
Nebraska	5	–	9	.357	12	–	14	.462
Oklahoma	3	–	11	.214	7	–	19	.269
Rankings from AP Poll

1968–69 Big Sky men's basketball standings
	Conf.				Overall
Team	W		L	PCT	W		L	PCT
Weber State	15	–	0	1.000	27	–	3	.900
Montana State	11	–	4	.733	17	–	8	.680
Gonzaga	6	–	9	.400	11	–	15	.423
Idaho	6	–	9	.400	11	–	15	.423
Montana	4	–	11	.267	9	–	17	.346
Idaho State	3	–	12	.200	8	–	18	.308

1968–69 Big Ten Conference men's basketball standings
	Conf.				Overall
Team	W		L	PCT	W		L	PCT
No. 6 Purdue	13	–	1	.929	23	–	5	.821
No. 20 Illinois	9	–	5	.643	19	–	5	.792
Ohio State	9	–	5	.643	17	–	7	.708
Michigan	7	–	7	.500	13	–	11	.542
Northwestern	6	–	8	.429	14	–	10	.583
Minnesota	6	–	8	.429	12	–	12	.500
Michigan State	6	–	8	.429	11	–	12	.478
Iowa	5	–	9	.357	12	–	12	.500
Wisconsin	5	–	9	.357	11	–	13	.458
Indiana	4	–	10	.286	9	–	15	.375
Rankings from AP Poll

1968–69 Ivy League men's basketball standings
	Conf.				Overall
Team	W		L	PCT	W		L	PCT
Princeton	14	–	0	1.000	19	–	7	.731
Columbia	11	–	3	.786	20	–	4	.833
Penn	10	–	4	.714	15	–	10	.600
Cornell	7	–	7	.500	12	–	13	.480
Yale	6	–	8	.429	9	–	16	.360
Dartmouth	4	–	10	.286	10	–	15	.400
Harvard	3	–	11	.214	7	–	18	.280
Brown	1	–	13	.071	3	–	23	.115
Rankings from AP Poll

1968–69 Metropolitan Collegiate Conference men's basketball standings
	Conf.				Overall
Team	W		L	PCT	W		L	PCT
Saint Peter's	7	–	1	.875	21	–	7	.750
Manhattan	7	–	1	.875	13	–	9	.591
LIU	6	–	2	.750	17	–	6	.739
Iona	4	–	4	.500	11	–	11	.500
Hofstra	4	–	4	.500	12	–	13	.480
Seton Hall	4	–	4	.500	9	–	16	.360
Fairleigh Dickinson	2	–	6	.250	9	–	13	.409
Wagner		–		–	18	–	10	.643
Rankings from AP Poll

1968–69 Mid-American Conference men's basketball standings
	Conf.				Overall
Team	W		L	PCT	W		L	PCT
Miami (Ohio)	10	–	2	.833	15	–	12	.556
Ohio	9	–	3	.750	17	–	9	.654
Kent State	6	–	6	.500	14	–	10	.583
Western Michigan	6	–	6	.500	11	–	13	.458
Toledo	5	–	7	.417	13	–	11	.542
Bowling Green State	3	–	9	.250	9	–	15	.375
Marshall	3	–	9	.250	9	–	15	.375
Rankings from AP Poll

1968–69 MAC men's basketball standings
	Conf.				Overall
Team	W		L	PCT	W		L	PCT
No. 2 La Salle†	5	–	0	1.000	23	–	1	.958
Temple	6	–	1	.857	22	–	8	.733
Bucknell	7	–	2	.778	13	–	11	.542
Gettysburg	6	–	4	.600	14	–	10	.583
Delaware	5	–	4	.556	11	–	10	.524
Saint Joseph's	2	–	2	.500	17	–	11	.607
Lehigh	4	–	6	.400	7	–	17	.292
Rider	2	–	5	.286	11	–	14	.440
Lafayette	3	–	9	.250	9	–	17	.346
American	0	–	7	.000	4	–	19	.174
West Chester (Pa.)*		–		–	12	–	13	.480
† Regular-season championship winner * – Played as non-major program Rankings from AP Poll

1968–69 Missouri Valley Conference men's basketball standings
	Conf.				Overall
Team	W		L	PCT	W		L	PCT
No. 11 Drake	13	–	3	.813	26	–	5	.839
No. 15 Louisville	13	–	3	.813	21	–	6	.778
Tulsa	11	–	5	.688	19	–	8	.704
Cincinnati	8	–	8	.500	17	–	9	.654
North Texas State	8	–	8	.500	15	–	10	.600
Bradley	7	–	9	.438	14	–	12	.538
Wichita State	7	–	9	.438	11	–	15	.423
Saint Louis	5	–	11	.313	6	–	20	.231
Memphis State	0	–	16	.000	6	–	19	.240
Rankings from AP Poll

1968–69 Ohio Valley Conference men's basketball standings
	Conf.				Overall
Team	W		L	PCT	W		L	PCT
Murray State	11	–	3	.786	22	–	6	.786
Morehead State	11	–	3	.786	18	–	9	.667
Western Kentucky	9	–	5	.643	16	–	10	.615
Eastern Kentucky	7	–	7	.500	13	–	9	.591
East Tennessee State	6	–	8	.429	15	–	11	.577
Tennessee Tech	5	–	9	.357	13	–	11	.542
Middle Tennessee	4	–	10	.286	13	–	13	.500
Austin Peay State	3	–	11	.214	10	–	14	.417
Rankings from AP Poll

1968–69 Pacific-8 Conference men's basketball standings
	Conf.				Overall
Team	W		L	PCT	W		L	PCT
No. 1 UCLA	13	–	1	.929	29	–	1	.967
Washington State	11	–	3	.786	18	–	8	.692
USC	8	–	6	.571	15	–	11	.577
Washington	6	–	8	.429	13	–	13	.500
Oregon	5	–	9	.357	13	–	13	.500
Oregon State	5	–	9	.357	12	–	14	.462
California	4	–	10	.286	12	–	13	.480
Stanford	4	–	10	.286	8	–	17	.320
As of April 15, 1969; Rankings from AP Poll

1968–69 Southeastern Conference men's basketball standings
	Conf.				Overall
Team	W		L	PCT	W		L	PCT
No. 7 Kentucky	16	–	2	.889	23	–	5	.821
Tennessee	13	–	5	.722	21	–	7	.750
Florida	12	–	6	.667	18	–	9	.667
Auburn	10	–	8	.556	15	–	10	.600
Vanderbilt	9	–	9	.500	15	–	11	.577
Georgia	9	–	9	.500	13	–	12	.520
LSU	7	–	11	.389	13	–	13	.500
Ole Miss	7	–	11	.389	10	–	14	.417
Mississippi State	6	–	12	.333	8	–	17	.320
Alabama	1	–	17	.056	4	–	20	.167
Rankings from AP Poll

1968–69 Southern Conference men's basketball standings
	Conf.				Overall
Team	W		L	PCT	W		L	PCT
No. 5 Davidson †	9	–	0	1.000	27	–	3	.900
East Carolina	9	–	2	.818	17	–	11	.607
George Washington	7	–	5	.583	14	–	11	.560
Richmond	6	–	7	.462	13	–	14	.481
Furman	5	–	6	.455	9	–	17	.346
The Citadel	5	–	8	.385	13	–	12	.520
William & Mary	3	–	8	.273	6	–	20	.231
VMI	3	–	11	.214	5	–	18	.217
† 1969 Southern Conference tournament winner Rankings from AP Poll

1968–69 Southland Conference men's basketball standings
	Conf.				Overall
Team	W		L	PCT	W		L	PCT
Trinity (Tex.)*		–		–	19	–	5	.792
Lamar*		–		–	20	–	4	.833
Texas-Arlington		–		–	8	–	18	.308
Arkansas State*		–		–	6	–	16	.273
Abilene Christian*		–		–	5	–	20	.200
* – Played as non-major program Rankings from AP poll

1968–69 Southwest Conference men's basketball standings
	Conf.				Overall
Team	W		L	PCT	W		L	PCT
Texas A&M	12	–	2	.857	18	–	9	.667
Baylor	10	–	4	.714	18	–	6	.750
SMU	8	–	6	.571	12	–	12	.500
Texas Tech	6	–	8	.429	11	–	13	.458
Rice	6	–	8	.429	10	–	14	.417
Texas	5	–	9	.357	9	–	15	.375
TCU	5	–	9	.357	12	–	12	.500
Arkansas	4	–	10	.286	10	–	14	.417
Rankings from AP Poll

1968–69 West Coast Athletic Conference men's basketball standings
	Conf.				Overall
Team	W		L	PCT	W		L	PCT
No. 3 Santa Clara	13	–	0	1.000	27	–	2	.931
San Jose State		–		–	16	–	8	.667
Pacific	7	–	5	.583	17	–	9	.654
UC Santa Barbara	8	–	4	.667	17	–	9	.654
Pepperdine	6	–	6	.500	14	–	12	.538
Loyola (Calif.)	3	–	9	.250	6	–	19	.240
Saint Mary's	3	–	9	.250	6	–	19	.240
San Francisco	3	–	10	.231	7	–	18	.280
Rankings from AP poll

1968–69 WAC men's basketball standings
	Conf.				Overall
Team	W		L	PCT	W		L	PCT
Wyoming	6	–	4	.600	19	–	9	.679
BYU	6	–	4	.600	16	–	12	.571
Arizona	5	–	5	.500	17	–	10	.630
Utah	5	–	5	.500	13	–	13	.500
New Mexico	4	–	6	.400	17	–	9	.654
Arizona State	4	–	6	.400	11	–	15	.423
Rankings from AP Poll

1968–69 Yankee Conference men's basketball standings
	Conf.				Overall
Team	W		L	PCT	W		L	PCT
Massachusetts	9	–	1	.900	17	–	7	.708
Rhode Island	7	–	3	.700	10	–	15	.400
Maine	5	–	5	.500	10	–	13	.435
Vermont	3	–	7	.300	14	–	11	.560
New Hampshire	3	–	7	.300	9	–	15	.375
Connecticut	3	–	7	.300	5	–	19	.208

=== University Division independents ===
A total of 56 college teams played as University Division independents. Among them, Boston College (24–4) had the best winning percentage (.857). Boston College, Marquette (24–5), and New Mexico State (24–5) finished with the most wins.

1968–69 NCAA University Division men's basketball independents standings
	Conf.				Overall
Team	W		L	PCT	W		L	PCT
No. 16 Boston College		–		–	24	–	4	.857
Rutgers		–		–	21	–	4	.840
No. 14 Marquette		–		–	24	–	5	.828
No. 12 New Mexico State		–		–	24	–	5	.828
No. 9 Duquesne		–		–	21	–	5	.808
No. 10 Villanova		–		–	21	–	5	.808
No. 8 St. John's		–		–	23	–	6	.793
Dayton		–		–	20	–	7	.741
No. 17 Notre Dame		–		–	20	–	7	.741
Seattle		–		–	20	–	8	.714
Colorado State		–		–	17	–	7	.708
Jacksonville		–		–	17	–	7	.708
St. Bonaventure		–		–	17	–	7	.708
Florida State		–		–	18	–	8	.692
West Texas State		–		–	18	–	8	.692
Holy Cross		–		–	16	–	8	.667
Oklahoma City		–		–	18	–	9	.667
Saint Francis (PA)		–		–	16	–	8	.667
Southern Illinois		–		–	16	–	8	.667
Fordham		–		–	17	–	9	.654
Army		–		–	18	–	10	.643
Texas Western		–		–	16	–	9	.640
Detroit		–		–	16	–	10	.615
Houston		–		–	16	–	10	.615
Penn State		–		–	13	–	9	.591
Boston University		–		–	14	–	10	.583
Miami (FL)		–		–	14	–	10	.583
Providence		–		–	14	–	10	.583
NYU		–		–	12	–	9	.571
DePaul		–		–	14	–	11	.560
Northern Illinois		–		–	13	–	11	.542
Virginia Tech		–		–	14	–	12	.538
Creighton		–		–	13	–	13	.500
Georgetown		–		–	12	–	12	.500
Hardin–Simmons		–		–	13	–	13	.500
Georgia Tech		–		–	12	–	13	.480
Tulane		–		–	12	–	14	.462
West Virginia		–		–	12	–	14	.462
Air Force		–		–	11	–	13	.458
Niagara		–		–	11	–	13	.458
Colgate		–		–	11	–	14	.440
Butler		–		–	11	–	15	.423
Loyola (IL)		–		–	9	–	14	.391
Fairfield		–		–	10	–	16	.385
Xavier		–		–	10	–	16	.385
Syracuse		–		–	9	–	16	.360
Utah State		–		–	9	–	17	.346
Centenary		–		–	9	–	18	.333
Navy		–		–	7	–	14	.333
Pan American		–		–	8	–	17	.320
Canisius		–		–	7	–	16	.304
St. Francis		–		–	7	–	16	.304
Loyola (LA)		–		–	5	–	19	.208
Pittsburgh		–		–	4	–	20	.167
Portland		–		–	3	–	23	.115
Denver		–		–	2	–	24	.077
Rankings from AP Poll

=== Informal championships ===
Conference	Regular season winner	Most Valuable Player
Philadelphia Big 5	La Salle	Ken Durrett, La Salle, & Howard Porter, Villanova

La Salle finished with a 4–0 record in head-to-head competition among the Philadelphia Big 5.

== Post-season tournaments ==
=== NCAA tournament ===
==== Final Four ====
National semifinals
E	North Carolina	65
ME	Purdue	92
MW	Drake	82
W	UCLA	85

National finals
ME	Purdue	72
W	UCLA	92
Third place
E	North Carolina	84
MW	Drake	104

=== National Invitation tournament ===
==== Semifinals & finals ====
Semifinals
Temple	63
Tennessee	58
Army	61
Boston College	73

Finals
Temple	89
Boston College	76
Third place
Tennessee	64
Army	52

== Awards ==
=== Consensus All-American teams ===
Consensus First Team
Player	Position	Class	Team
Lew Alcindor	C	Senior	UCLA
Spencer Haywood	F	Sophomore	Detroit
Pete Maravich	G/F	Junior	Louisiana State
Rick Mount	G/F	Junior	Purdue
Calvin Murphy	G	Junior	Niagara

Consensus Second Team
Player	Position	Class	Team
Dan Issel	F/C	Junior	Kentucky
Mike Maloy	F	Junior	Davidson
Bud Ogden	F	Senior	Santa Clara
Charlie Scott	F	Senior	North Carolina
Jo Jo White	G	Senior	Kansas

=== Major player of the year awards ===
- Naismith Award: Lew Alcindor, UCLA
- Helms Player of the Year: Lew Alcindor, UCLA
- Associated Press Player of the Year: Lew Alcindor, UCLA
- UPI Player of the Year: Lew Alcindor, UCLA
- Oscar Robertson Trophy (USBWA): Pete Maravich, LSU
- Sporting News Player of the Year: Lew Alcindor, UCLA

=== Major coach of the year awards ===
- Associated Press Coach of the Year: John Wooden, UCLA
- Henry Iba Award (USBWA): John Wooden, UCLA
- NABC Coach of the Year: John Wooden, UCLA
- UPI Coach of the Year: John Wooden, UCLA
- Sporting News Coach of the Year: John Wooden, UCLA

=== Other major awards ===
- Frances Pomeroy Naismith Award (Best player under 6'0): Billy Keller, Purdue
- Robert V. Geasey Trophy (Top player in Philadelphia Big 5): Ken Durrett, La Salle, & Howard Porter, Villanova
- NIT/Haggerty Award (Top player in New York City metro area): Jim McMillian, Columbia

== Coaching changes ==
A number of teams changed coaches during the season and after it ended.

Team	Former Coach	Interim Coach	New Coach	Reason
Abilene Christian	Dee Nut		Garnie Hatch	
American	Alan Kyber		Tom Young	
Arkansas State	Marvin Speight		John Rose	
Boston College	Bob Cousy		Chuck Daly	
Brown	L. Stanley Ward		Gerry Alaimo	
Connecticut	Burr Carlson		Dee Rowe	
Creighton	Red McManus		Eddie Sutton	
Dartmouth	Dave Gavitt		George Blaney	
Davidson	Lefty Driesell		Terry Holland	Driesell left to coach Maryland.
Detroit	Bob Calihan		Jim Harding	
Duke	Vic Bubas		Bucky Waters	
Fairleigh Dickinson	Jack Devine		Al LoBalbo	
Marshall	Ellis T. Johnson		Stewart Way	Johnson resigned at the end of the season. He was replaced by his assistant coach, Stewart Way.
Maryland	Frank Fellows		Lefty Driesell	Successful Davidson coach Driesell was hired and proclaimed his intention to turn Maryland into the “UCLA of the East.”
Michigan State	John Benington		Gus Ganakas	
Middle Tennessee	Ken Trickey		Jimmy Earle	
Montana State	Roger Craft		Gary Hulst	
Morehead State	Bob Wright		Bill Harrell	
New Hampshire	Bill Haubrich		Gerry Friel	
Northwestern	Larry Glass		Brad Snyder	
Portland	Bill Turner		Ernie Smith	
Providence	Joe Mullaney		Dave Gavitt	
Saint Francis (PA)	John Clark		John Hiller	
Saint Louis	Buddy Brehmer		Bob Polk	
St. Francis	Daniel Lynch		Lester Yellin	
Tennessee Tech	Ken Sidwell		Connie Inman	
Texas Tech	Gene Gibson		Bob Bass	
VMI	Gary McPherson		Mike Schuler	
West Virginia	Bucky Waters		Sonny Moran	
