= 1968–69 Michigan State Spartans men's basketball team =

American college basketball season

1968–69 Michigan State Spartans men's basketball
- Conference: Big Ten Conference
- Record: 11–12 (6–8 Big Ten)
- Head coach: John E. Benington (4th season)
- Assistant coaches: Gus Ganakas; Robert Nordmann
- Captain: Lee Lafayette
- Home arena: Jenison Fieldhouse

1968–69 Big Ten Conference men's basketball standings
	Conf.				Overall
Team	W		L	PCT	W		L	PCT
No. 6 Purdue	13	–	1	.929	23	–	5	.821
No. 20 Illinois	9	–	5	.643	19	–	5	.792
Ohio State	9	–	5	.643	17	–	7	.708
Michigan	7	–	7	.500	13	–	11	.542
Northwestern	6	–	8	.429	14	–	10	.583
Minnesota	6	–	8	.429	12	–	12	.500
Michigan State	6	–	8	.429	11	–	12	.478
Iowa	5	–	9	.357	12	–	12	.500
Wisconsin	5	–	9	.357	11	–	13	.458
Indiana	4	–	10	.286	9	–	15	.375
Rankings from AP Poll

The 1968–69 Michigan State Spartans men's basketball team represented Michigan State University in the 1968–69 NCAA Division I men's basketball season as members of the Big Ten Conference. They played their home games at Jenison Fieldhouse in East Lansing, Michigan and were coached by John E. Benington in his fourth year as head coach of the Spartans. The Spartans finished the season 11–12, 6–8 in Big Ten play to finish in a three-way tie for fifth place.

The season marked the final season for head coach John Benington. Prior to the next season, on September 10, 1969, Benington suffered a heart attack and died after jogging at Jenison Fieldhouse at the age of 47. Ganakas, an assistant under Benington, was promoted to head coach for the season.

== Previous season ==
The Spartans finished the 1967–68 season 12–12, 6–8 in Big Ten play to finish in a three-way tie for sixth place.

== Roster and statistics ==
1968–69 Michigan State Spartans men's basketball team
No	Name	Pos	Year	Height	Pts	Reb
11	Lloyd Ward	G	JR	5–10	4.3	1.3
12	Tim Bograkos	G	SO	6–1	5.8	1.7
14	Eddie Humphrey	G	SO	6–2		0.7
15	Steve Sizemore	F	SO	6–2		0.2
21	Rudy Benjamin	G	SO	6–3	7.7	2.6
24	John Holms	F	SR	6–4	3.1	2.0
25	Robert Gale	F	JR	6–5	3.1	2.4
31	Harrison Stepter	G	SR	6–3	9.2	4.0
32	Steve Kirkpatrick	G	JR	6–2		1.2
33	Paul Dean	G	SO	6–1	1.6	1.1
34	Tom Lick	C	SR	6–10	3.7	3.0
35	Lee Lafayette	C	SR	6–6	18.7	10.3
41	James Gibbons	F	JR	6–5	10.7	5.7
44	Ron Binge	F	JR	6–5	1.3	0.9
45	Bernie Copeland	F	SR	6–6	10.3	6.9

== Schedule and results ==
Date time, TV	Rank^{#}	Opponent^{#}	Result	Record	Site city, state
Regular season
Dec 3, 1968*		Southwestern Louisiana	W 90–84	1–0	Jenison Fieldhouse; East Lansing, MI
Dec 6, 1968*		Western Michigan	W 86–71	2–0	Jenison Fieldhouse; East Lansing, MI
Dec 7, 1969*		at Toledo	W 81–80	3–0	The Field House; Toledo, OH
Dec 13, 1960*		Butler	W 70–60	4–0	Jenison Fieldhouse; East Lansing, MI
Dec 14, 1968*		vs. No. 15 Western Kentucky	L 63–67	4–1	Chicago Stadium; Chicago, IL
Dec 16, 1968*		at Nebraska	L 59–73	4–2	Nebraska Coliseum; Lincoln, NE
Dec 27, 1968*		at St. John's; ECAC Holiday Festival	L 51–61	4–3	Madison Square Garden; New York, NY
Dec 28, 1968*		vs. No. 5 Villanova; ECAC Holiday Festival	L 66–75	4–4	Madison Square Garden; New York, NY
Jan 4, 1969		Northwestern	L 71–85	4–5 (0–1)	Jenison Fieldhouse; East Lansing, MI
Jan 7, 1969		Wisconsin	W 77–67	5–5 (1–1)	Jenison Fieldhouse; East Lansing, MI
Jan 14, 1969		at Iowa	L 76–77	5–6 (1–2)	Iowa Field House; Iowa City, IA
Jan 18, 1969		at No. 19 Northwestern	W 89–75	6–6 (2–2)	Welsh-Ryan Arena; Evanston, IL
Jan 25, 1968		Michigan; Rivalry	L 70–75	6–7 (2–3)	Jenison Fieldhouse; East Lansing, MI
Feb 1, 1969		at Indiana	L 76–79	6–8 (2–4)	Assembly Hall; Bloomington, IN
Feb 8, 1969		at Michigan; Rivlary	W 86–82	7–8 (3–4)	Crisler Arena; Ann Arbor, MI
Feb 11, 1969*		at Notre Dame	W 71–59	8–8	Purcell Pavilion at the Joyce Center; South Bend, IN
Feb 15, 1969		No. 8 Illinois	W 75–70	9–8 (4–4)	Jenison Fieldhouse; East Lansing, MI
Feb 18, 1969		Iowa	W 78–60	10–8 (5–4)	Jenison Fieldhouse; East Lansing, MI
Feb 22, 1969		at Wisconsin	L 64–76	10–9 (5–5)	Wisconsin Field House; Madison, WI
Feb 25, 1969		No. 9 Purdue	L 72–74	10–10 (5–6)	Jenison Fieldhouse; East Lansing, MI
Mar 1, 1969		No. 14 Ohio State	W 85–72	11–10 (6–6)	Jenison Fieldhouse; East Lansing, MI
Mar 4, 1969		at No. 20 Illinois	L 57–71	11–11 (6–7)	Assembly Hall; Champaign, IL
Mar 8, 1969		at Minnesota	L 65–78	11–12 (6–8)	Williams Arena; Minneapolis, MN
*Non-conference game. ^{#}Rankings from AP Poll. (#) Tournament seedings in parentheses. Source
