= 1968–69 Ohio Bobcats men's basketball team =

American college basketball season

1968–69 Ohio Bobcats men's basketball

NIT, Second Round
- Conference: Mid-American Conference
- Record: 17–9 (9–3 MAC)
- Head coach: Jim Snyder (20th season)
- Home arena: Convocation Center

1968–69 Mid-American Conference men's basketball standings
	Conf.				Overall
Team	W		L	PCT	W		L	PCT
Miami (Ohio)	10	–	2	.833	15	–	12	.556
Ohio	9	–	3	.750	17	–	9	.654
Kent State	6	–	6	.500	14	–	10	.583
Western Michigan	6	–	6	.500	11	–	13	.458
Toledo	5	–	7	.417	13	–	11	.542
Bowling Green State	3	–	9	.250	9	–	15	.375
Marshall	3	–	9	.250	9	–	15	.375
Rankings from AP Poll

The 1968–69 Ohio Bobcats men's basketball team represented Ohio University as a member of the Mid-American Conference in the college basketball season of 1968–69. The team was coached by Jim Snyder and for the first time played their home games at the recently constructed Convocation Center. The Bobcats finished with a record of 17–9 and finished second in the MAC regular season with a conference record of 9–3. They were invited to the 1969 National Invitation Tournament. There they defeated West Texas State before losing to Tennessee in the second round.

== Schedule ==
Date time, TV	Rank^{#}	Opponent^{#}	Result	Record	Site (attendance) city, state
Regular Season
11/30/1968*		at No. 12 Ohio State	L 77–85	0–1	
12/3/1968*		Indiana	W 80–70	1–1	
12/7/1968*		No. 16 Ohio Wesleyan	W 101–55	2–1	
12/14/1968*		at Purdue	L 89–100	2–2	
12/17/1968*		at Illinois	L 82–95	2–3	
12/19/1968*		at Northwestern	L 80–89	2–4	
12/27/1968*		vs. Wisconsin; Milwaukee Classic	L 68–74	2–5	
12/28/1968*		vs. Army; Milwaukee Classic	W 68–60	3–5	
12/31/1968*		MacMurray	W 95–75	4–5	
MAC regular season
1/4/1969		at Kent State	W 70–69	5–5 (1–0)	
1/7/1969*		West Virginia Wesleyan	W 111–51	6–5	
1/11/1969		Bowling Green	L 74–75	6–6 (1–1)	
1/15/1969		at Miami (OH)	L 53–67	6–7 (1–2)	
1/18/1969		at Toledo	W 92–86 ^{OT}	7–7 (2–2)	
1/25/1969		Kent State	W 75–72 ^{OT}	8-7 (3–2)	
1/29/1969		Western Michigan	W 78–68	9–7 (4–2)	
2/1/1969		at Marshall	W 110–94	10–7 (5–2)	
2/5/1969		Toledo	W 98–95 ^{OT}	11–7 (6–2)	
2/8/1969		at Western Michigan	L 89–97	11–8 (6–3)	
2/15/1969		Miami (OH)	W 60–59	12–8 (7–3)	
2/17/1969*		Loyola (IL)	W 103–92	13–8	
2/22/1969		Marshall	W 86–80	14–8 (8–3)	
2/24/1969*		Northern Illinois	W 87–86	15–8	
3/1/1969		at Bowling Green	W 95–88 ^{OT}	16–8 (9–3)	
NIT
3/14/1969*		vs. West Texas State	W 82–80	17–8	
3/17/1969*		vs. Tennessee; NIT Quarterfinals	L 64–75	17–9	
*Non-conference game. ^{#}Rankings from AP Poll. (#) Tournament seedings in parentheses. All times are in Eastern Time.

== Statistics ==
=== Team statistics ===
Final 1968–69 statistics

Record	Ohio	OPP
Scoring	2167	2037
Scoring Average	83.35	78.35
Field goals – Att	846–1950	760–1793
Free throws – Att	475–697	517–735
Rebounds	1361	1216
Assists		
Turnovers		
Steals		
Blocked Shots		

=== Player statistics ===
			Minutes		Scoring		Total FGs			Free-Throws			Rebounds						
Player	GP	GS	Tot	Avg	Pts	Avg	FG	FGA	Pct	FT	FTA	Pct	Tot	Avg	A	PF	TO	Stl	Blk
Gerald McKee	26	-			485	18.7	210	502	0.418	65	111	0.586	250	9.6		71			
John Canine	26	-			414	15.9	173	385	0.449	68	86	0.791	94	3.6		47			
Greg McDivitt	26	-			339	13.0	135	289	0.467	69	93	0.742	181	7.0		94			
Ken Kowall	25	-			266	10.6	88	228	0.386	90	111	0.811	106	4.2		60			
Doug Parker	26	-			193	7.4	73	151	0.483	47	69	0.681	125	4.8		61			
Craig Love	26	-			178	6.8	69	148	0.466	40	62	0.645	192	7.4		80			
Dave Groff	26	-			166	6.4	59	135	0.437	48	92	0.522	137	5.3		77			
Steve Battle	25	-			59	2.4	13	47	0.277	33	50	0.660	41	1.6		32			
Mike Miller	11	-			28	2.5	13	27	0.481	2	5	0.400	7	0.6		10			
Gary Wolf	7	-			14	2.0	4	14	0.286	6	8	0.750	13	1.9		3			
Larry Coon	8	-			12	1.5	4	10	0.400	4	6	0.667	7	0.9		9			
John Glancy	6	-			5	0.8	2	8	0.250	0	0	0.000	3	0.5		2			
Larry Hunter	5	-			5	1.0	1	2	0.500	3	4	0.750	1	0.2		2			
Grant Coutright	2	-			2	1.0	1	1	1.000	0	0	0.000	1	0.5		0			
Jack Milhollan	2	-			2	1.0	1	3	0.333	0	0	0.000	1	0.5		0			
Total	26	-	-	-	2167	83.3	846	1950	0.434	475	697	0.681	1361	52.3		548			
Opponents	26	-	-	-	2037	78.3	760	1793	0.424	517	735	0.703	1216	46.8		521			

Legend
GP	Games played	GS	Games started	Avg	Average per game
FG	Field-goals made	FGA	Field-goal attempts	Off	Offensive rebounds
Def	Defensive rebounds	A	Assists	TO	Turnovers
Blk	Blocks	Stl	Steals	High	Team high
