= 1968–69 Michigan Wolverines men's basketball team =

American college basketball season

1968–69 Michigan Wolverines men's basketball
- Conference: Big Ten Conference
- Record: 13–11 (7–7 Big Ten)
- Head coach: Johnny Orr
- Assistant coaches: Fred Snowden; George Pomey (freshmen); Dick Honig
- MVP: Rudy Tomjanovich
- Captain: Ken Maxey
- Home arena: Crisler Arena

1968–69 Big Ten Conference men's basketball standings
| | Conf. | | | | Overall |
| Team | W | | L | PCT | W | | L | PCT |
|---|---|---|---|---|---|---|---|---|
| No. 6 Purdue | 13 | – | 1 | .929 | 23 | – | 5 | .821 |
| No. 20 Illinois | 9 | – | 5 | .643 | 19 | – | 5 | .792 |
| Ohio State | 9 | – | 5 | .643 | 17 | – | 7 | .708 |
| Michigan | 7 | – | 7 | .500 | 13 | – | 11 | .542 |
| Northwestern | 6 | – | 8 | .429 | 14 | – | 10 | .583 |
| Minnesota | 6 | – | 8 | .429 | 12 | – | 12 | .500 |
| Michigan State | 6 | – | 8 | .429 | 11 | – | 12 | .478 |
| Iowa | 5 | – | 9 | .357 | 12 | – | 12 | .500 |
| Wisconsin | 5 | – | 9 | .357 | 11 | – | 13 | .458 |
| Indiana | 4 | – | 10 | .286 | 9 | – | 15 | .375 |
Rankings from AP Poll

The 1968–69 Michigan Wolverines men's basketball team represented the University of Michigan in intercollegiate college basketball during the 1968–69 season. The team played its home games at Crisler Arena on the school's campus in Ann Arbor, Michigan. Under the direction of head coach Johnny Orr, the team finished fourth in the Big Ten Conference. The team was unranked the entire season in the Associated Press Top Twenty Poll, and it also ended the season unranked in the final UPI Coaches' Poll. The team defeated two of the seven ranked opponents that it faced (#16 Duke 90–80 on December 9, 1968, at the Kentucky Invitational Tournament held at Rupp Arena in Lexington, Kentucky, and #10 Illinois 92–87 on February 11, 1969, at Assembly Hall in Champaign, Illinois). Ken Maxey served as team captain, while Rudy Tomjanovich earned team MVP. Over the course of the season Tomjanovich led the conference in rebounding with a 12.8 average in conference games. On February 1, 1969, against Loyola, Tomjanovich set the current Michigan Wolverines single-game rebound record with 30, surpassing a record of 27 that he had tied M. C. Burton, Jr. for on December 6, 1967. On January 7, 1969, against Indiana, Tomjanovich, tied Cazzie Russell's school single-game scoring record with 48 points. Based on these two performances, Tomjanovich continues to hold both the school record for single-game points and single-game rebounds. The following season, he would set the career rebound record, which also still stands.

== Roster ==
1968–69 Michigan Wolverines men's basketball team
Players
Coaches

| Pos. | # | Name | Height | Weight | Year | Hometown |
|---|---|---|---|---|---|---|
| F | 52 | Willie Lee Edwards | 6 ft 6 in (1.98 m) | 195 lb (88 kg) | So | Detroit, Michigan |
| G | 24 | Dan Fife | 6 ft 2 in (1.88 m) | 188 lb (85 kg) | So | Clarkston, Michigan |
| F | 45 | Rudy Tomjanovich | 6 ft 7 in (2.01 m) | 210 lb (95 kg) | Jr | Hamtramck, Michigan |

Head coach

- Johnny Orr

Assistant coach(es)

Legend

- (C) Team captain
- (S) Suspended
- (I) Ineligible
- (W) Walk-on
- Injured
- Current redshirt

== Team players drafted into the NBA ==
Three players from this team were selected in the NBA draft.

| Year | Round | Pick | Overall | Player | NBA Club |
| 1969 | 4 | 1 | 44 | Dennis Stewart | Phoenix Suns |
| 1970 | 1 | 2 | 2 | Rudy Tomjanovich | San Diego Rockets |
| 1971 | 10 | 16 | 168 | Dan Fife | Milwaukee Bucks |
