= Harv Schmidt =

American basketball player and coach (1935–2020)

Personal information
- Born: September 25, 1935 Kankakee, Illinois, U.S.
- Died: April 7, 2020 (aged 83) Windsor, Colorado, U.S.
- Listed height: 6 ft 6 in (1.98 m)
- Listed weight: 195 lb (88 kg)

Career information
- College: Illinois (1954-1957)
- NBA draft: 1957: 2nd round, 11th overall pick
- Drafted by: Minneapolis Lakers
- Position: Small forward

Career history

Playing
- 1954–1957: Illinois

Coaching
- 1967–1974: Illinois
- Stats at Basketball Reference

Harvard Schmidt (September 25, 1935 – April 7, 2020) was an American professional basketball player and coach. A 6 ft 6 in (1.98 m), 195 pounds (88 kg) small forward from Kankakee, Illinois. Schmidt attended the University of Illinois at Urbana–Champaign, where he played from 1954 to 1957 for the men's basketball team. He also coached the Fighting Illini men's basketball team for seven years from 1967 to 1974.

Schmidt averaged 12.3 points per game for his collegiate career, playing in 65 games. He was selected in the second round (11th pick overall) of the 1957 NBA Draft by the Minneapolis Lakers.

Schmidt was appointed by his alma mater on 29 March 1967 to succeed Harry Combes who had been his head coach a decade earlier and was pressured into resigning ten days prior by the university which was threatened with expulsion by the Big Ten Conference over a slush fund scandal. He announced on 20 February 1974 his resignation effective at the end of a season in which the Fighting Illini set a program-record eleven-game losing streak and finished with a 5–18 overall record. The lack of success was attributed to his failure at recruiting black talent in Chicago. He compiled a record of 89 wins and 77 losses. He was replaced by Gene Bartow on 9 March 1974.

Schmidt died on April 7, 2020, at the age of 83.

== Head coaching record ==
Record table
| Season | Team | Overall | Conference | Standing | Postseason |
|---|---|---|---|---|---|
Illinois Fighting Illini (Big Ten Conference) (1967–1974)
| 1967–68 | Illinois | 11–13 | 6–8 | T–7th | |
| 1968–69 | Illinois | 19–5 | 9–5 | T–2nd | |
| 1969–70 | Illinois | 15–9 | 8–6 | T–3rd | |
| 1970–71 | Illinois | 11–12 | 5–9 | T–5th | |
| 1971–72 | Illinois | 14–10 | 5–9 | T–8th | |
| 1972–73 | Illinois | 14–10 | 8–6 | T–3rd | |
| 1973–74 | Illinois | 5–18 | 2–12 | 10th | |
| Illinois: | | 89–77 | 43–55 | | |
| Total: | | 89–77 | | | |
