= 1968–69 Washington Huskies men's basketball team =

American college basketball season

1968–69 Washington Huskies men's basketball
- Conference: Pacific-8 Conference
- Record: 13–13 (6–8 Pac-8)
- Head coach: Tex Winter (1st season)
- Home arena: Hec Edmundson Pavilion

1968–69 Pacific-8 Conference men's basketball standings
	Conf.				Overall
Team	W		L	PCT	W		L	PCT
No. 1 UCLA	13	–	1	.929	29	–	1	.967
Washington State	11	–	3	.786	18	–	8	.692
USC	8	–	6	.571	15	–	11	.577
Washington	6	–	8	.429	13	–	13	.500
Oregon	5	–	9	.357	13	–	13	.500
Oregon State	5	–	9	.357	12	–	14	.462
California	4	–	10	.286	12	–	13	.480
Stanford	4	–	10	.286	8	–	17	.320
As of April 15, 1969; Rankings from AP Poll

The 1968–69 Washington Huskies men's basketball team represented the University of Washington for the 1968–69 NCAA University Division basketball season. Led by first-year head coach Tex Winter, the Huskies were members of the Pacific-8 Conference and played their home games on campus at Hec Edmundson Pavilion in Seattle, Washington.

The Huskies were 13–13 overall in the regular season and 6–8 in conference play, fourth in the standings.

Winter was hired in March 1968; he had led Kansas State for the previous fifteen seasons, and the Wildcats were Big Eight champions in 1968. He coached the Huskies for three seasons, then left for the NBA's Houston Rockets.

== Roster ==
1968–69 Washington Huskies men's basketball team
Players
Coaches

Pos.	#	Name	Height	Weight	Year	Hometown
F	40	Mark Bantz	6 ft 8 in (2.03 m)	190 lb (86 kg)	Jr	Spokane, Washington
C	31	Jay Bond	6 ft 9 in (2.06 m)	225 lb (102 kg)	Jr	Spokane, Washington
F	45	John Buller	6 ft 6 in (1.98 m)	205 lb (93 kg)	Jr	Omaha, Nebraska
F	42	Larry Bullock	6 ft 7 in (2.01 m)	190 lb (86 kg)	Jr	Seattle, Washington
G	20	Dave Huguenin	6 ft 2 in (1.88 m)	175 lb (79 kg)	Sr	Bremerton, Washington
F	23	George Irvine	6 ft 5 in (1.96 m)	190 lb (86 kg)	Jr	Seattle, Washington
C	34	Gary Larsen	6 ft 8 in (2.03 m)	220 lb (100 kg)	Jr	Lakewood, Washington
G	10	Gary Ostenson	6 ft 1 in (1.85 m)	165 lb (75 kg)	Sr	Camas, Washington
G	15	Rick Slettedahl	5 ft 10 in (1.78 m)	165 lb (75 kg)	Sr	Elma, Washington
G	22	Rafael Stone	5 ft 9 in (1.75 m)	155 lb (70 kg)	Jr	Seattle, Washington
G	12	Michael Troyer	5 ft 10 in (1.78 m)	165 lb (75 kg)	So	Greencastle, Indiana
F/C	35	Marc Wallace	6 ft 8 in (2.03 m)	210 lb (95 kg)	So	Spokane, Washington
G	30	Dave West	6 ft 0 in (1.83 m)	170 lb (77 kg)	Jr	Seattle, Washington
G	11	Dave Willenborg	6 ft 0 in (1.83 m)	190 lb (86 kg)	So	Renton, Washington
F	33	Gary Woodman	6 ft 7 in (2.01 m)	200 lb (91 kg)	Jr	Topeka, Kansas
F	32	Pat Woolcock	6 ft 5 in (1.96 m)	200 lb (91 kg)	Jr	Everett, Washington

Head coach

- Tex Winter

Assistant coach(es)

- Lynn Nance

Legend

- (C) Team captain
- (S) Suspended
- (I) Ineligible
- (W) Walk-on
- Injured
- Current redshirt
