= 1968–69 Washington State Cougars men's basketball team =

American college basketball season

1968–69 Washington State Cougars men's basketball
- Conference: Pacific-8
- Record: 18–8 (11–3 Pac-8)
- Head coach: Marv Harshman (11th season)
- Home arena: Bohler Gymnasium

1968–69 Pacific-8 Conference men's basketball standings
	Conf.				Overall
Team	W		L	PCT	W		L	PCT
No. 1 UCLA	13	–	1	.929	29	–	1	.967
Washington State	11	–	3	.786	18	–	8	.692
USC	8	–	6	.571	15	–	11	.577
Washington	6	–	8	.429	13	–	13	.500
Oregon	5	–	9	.357	13	–	13	.500
Oregon State	5	–	9	.357	12	–	14	.462
California	4	–	10	.286	12	–	13	.480
Stanford	4	–	10	.286	8	–	17	.320
As of April 15, 1969; Rankings from AP Poll

The 1968–69 Washington State Cougars men's basketball team represented Washington State University for the 1968–69 NCAA college basketball season. Led by eleventh-year head coach Marv Harshman, the Cougars were members of the Pacific-8 Conference and played their home games on campus at Bohler Gymnasium in Pullman, Washington.

The Cougars were 18–8 overall in the regular season and 11–3 in conference play, second in the standings, and the best since 1941.
