= 1968–69 Cincinnati Bearcats men's basketball team =

American college basketball season

1968–69 Cincinnati Bearcats men's basketball
- Conference: Missouri Valley Conference
- Record: 17–9 (8–8 MVC)
- Head coach: Tay Baker
- Home arena: Armory Fieldhouse

1968–69 Missouri Valley Conference men's basketball standings
	Conf.				Overall
Team	W		L	PCT	W		L	PCT
No. 11 Drake	13	–	3	.813	26	–	5	.839
No. 15 Louisville	13	–	3	.813	21	–	6	.778
Tulsa	11	–	5	.688	19	–	8	.704
Cincinnati	8	–	8	.500	17	–	9	.654
North Texas State	8	–	8	.500	15	–	10	.600
Bradley	7	–	9	.438	14	–	12	.538
Wichita State	7	–	9	.438	11	–	15	.423
Saint Louis	5	–	11	.313	6	–	20	.231
Memphis State	0	–	16	.000	6	–	19	.240
Rankings from AP Poll

The 1968–69 Cincinnati Bearcats men's basketball team represented the University of Cincinnati during the 1968–69 NCAA men's basketball season.

== Missouri Valley Conference standings ==
#	Team	Conference	Pct.	Overall	Pct.
1	Drake	13–3	.813	26–5	.839
2	Louisville	13–3	.813	21–6	.778
3	Tulsa	11–5	.688	19–8	.704
4	Cincinnati	8–8	.500	17–9	.654
5	North Texas State	8–8	.500	15–10	.600
6	Bradley	7–9	.438	14–12	.539
7	Wichita State	7–9	.438	11–15	.423
8	Saint Louis	5–11	.313	6–19	.240
9	Memphis State	0–16	.000	6–19	.240

== Roster ==
1968–69 Cincinnati Bearcats men's basketball team
Players
Coaches

Pos.	#	Name	Height	Weight	Year	Hometown
C	11	Jim Ard	6 ft 8 in (2.03 m)	215 lb (98 kg)	Jr	Markham, Illinois
F	35	Rick Roberson	6 ft 9 in (2.06 m)	235 lb (107 kg)	Sr	Memphis, Tennessee

Head coach

- Tay Baker

Assistant coach(es)

Legend

- (C) Team captain
- (S) Suspended
- (I) Ineligible
- (W) Walk-on
- Injured
- Current redshirt

== Schedule ==
Date time, TV	Rank^{#}	Opponent^{#}	Result	Record	Site city, state
November 30*		South Dakota	W 84–62	1–0	Armory Fieldhouse; Cincinnati, Ohio
December 2*		Kansas State	W 86–70	2–0	Armory Fieldhouse; Cincinnati, Ohio
December 6*		North Dakota State	W 83–54	3–0	Armory Fieldhouse; Cincinnati, Ohio
December 14*		at Miami (OH)	W 56–48	4–0	Millett Hall
December 16*		at USC	L 68–83	4–1	Los Angeles Sports Arena; Los Angeles, California
December 18*		at California	W 71–70	5–1	Harmon Gym
December 20*		at Stanford	W 60–49	6–1	Maples Pavilion; Stanford, California
December 28		North Texas	W 74–62	7–1 (1–0)	Armory Fieldhouse; Cincinnati, Ohio
January 2		at Tulsa	L 50–57	7–2 (1–1)	Expo Square Pavilion
January 4		at Wichita State	L 66–67	7–3 (1–2)	Levitt Arena
January 8*		Xavier	W 52–50	8–3 (1–2)	Cincinnati Gardens; Cincinnati, Ohio
January 11		Louisville	W 87–75	9–3 (2–2)	Armory Fieldhouse; Cincinnati, Ohio
January 14		Drake	L 64–69	9–4 (2–3)	Armory Fieldhouse; Cincinnati, Ohio
January 18*		NOH Michigan	W 106–59	10–4 (2–3)	Armory Fieldhouse; Cincinnati, Ohio
January 25		Memphis	W 62–53	11–4 (3–3)	Armory Fieldhouse; Cincinnati, Ohio
January 28		at Bradley	W 82–62	12–4 (4–3)	Robertson Memorial Field House
February 1		at St. Louis	W 96–72	13–4 (5–3)	St. Louis Arena
February 6		at North Texas	L 74–94	13–5 (5–4)	North Texas Men's Gym
February 8		at Memphis	W 69–47	14–5 (6–4)	Mid-South Coliseum
February 13		Wichita State	L 73–75	14–6 (6–5)	Armory Fieldhouse; Cincinnati, Ohio
February 15		No. 7 Tulsa	W 76–63	15–6 (7–5)	Armory Fieldhouse; Cincinnati, Ohio
February 19*		Dayton	W 96–60	16–6 (8–5)	Armory Fieldhouse; Cincinnati, Ohio
February 22		at No. 13 Louisville	L 68–72	16–7 (8–6)	Freedom Hall; Louisville, Kentucky
February 25		at Drake	L 68–85	16–8 (8–7)	Veterans Memorial Auditorium
March 4		Bradley	L 61–64	16–9 (8–8)	Armory Fieldhouse; Cincinnati, Ohio
March 8		St. Louis	W 94–63	17–9 (9–8)	Armory Fieldhouse; Cincinnati, Ohio
*Non-conference game. ^{#}Rankings from AP Poll. (#) Tournament seedings in parentheses.
