= 1969 NCAA University Division basketball championship game =

1969 NCAA Tournament Championship Game
National championship game
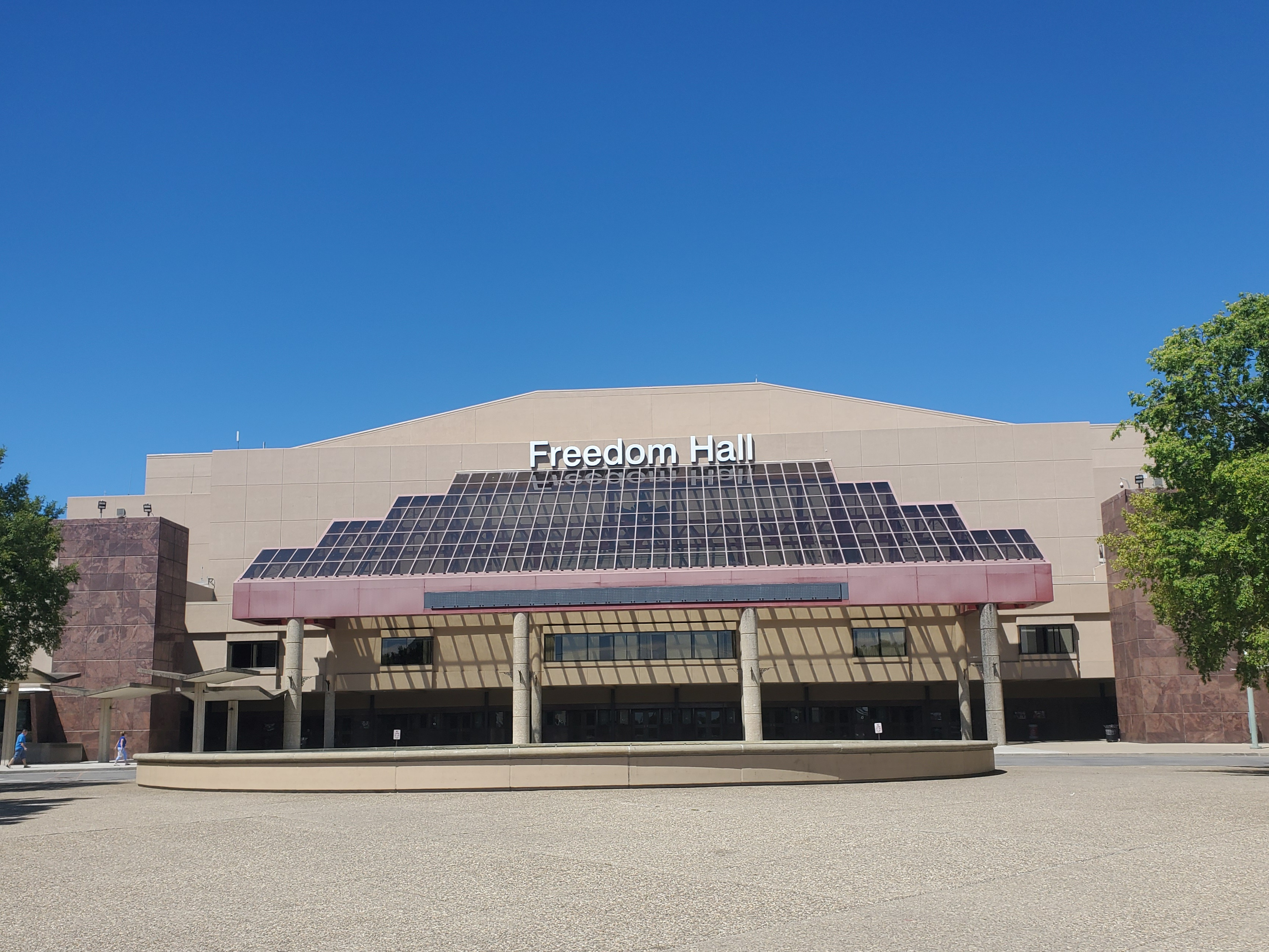
- Freedom Hall in Louisville, Kentucky, hosted the championship game.
UCLA Bruins	Purdue Boilermakers
Pac-8	Big Ten
(28-1)	(23-4)
92	72
Head coach: John Wooden	Head coach: George King
- AP: 1
- Coaches: 1
- AP: 6
- Coaches: 7
	1st half	2nd half	Total
UCLA Bruins	42	50	92
Purdue Boilermakers	31	41	72
- Date: March 22, 1969
- Venue: Freedom Hall, Louisville, Kentucky
- MVP: Lew Alcindor, UCLA
- Attendance: 18,669

United States TV coverage
- Network: NBC
- Announcers: Curt Gowdy and Jim Simpson

The 1969 NCAA University Division Basketball Championship Game was the finals of the 1969 NCAA University Division basketball tournament and it determined the national champion for the 1968-69 NCAA University Division men's basketball season. The game was played on March 22, 1969, at Freedom Hall in Louisville, Kentucky. It featured the two-time defending national champion UCLA Bruins of the Pacific-8 Conference, and the Purdue Boilermakers of the Big Ten Conference.

The Bruins blew out the Boilermakers to win their third of seven consecutive national championships, becoming the first (and to date, only) team to ever three-peat as national champions.

This was Purdue's last appearance in the championship game until 2024.

== Participating teams ==
=== UCLA Bruins ===
- West
  - UCLA 53, New Mexico State 38
  - UCLA 90, Santa Clara 53
- Final Four
  - UCLA 85, Drake 82

=== Purdue Boilermakers ===
- Mideast
  - Purdue 91, Miami (OH) 71
  - Purdue 75, Marquette 73 (OT)
- Final Four
  - Purdue 92, North Carolina 65

== Game summary ==
NBC

March 22, 1969

#1 UCLA Bruins 92, #6 Purdue Boilermakers 72
Scoring by half: 42-31, 50-41
Pts: Kareem Abdul-Jabbar 37; Rebs: Kareem Abdul-Jabbar 20; Asts: Kenny Heitz 4	Pts: Rick Mount 28; Rebs: Herm Gilliam 11; Asts: Herm Gilliam, Bill Keller 3

Freedom Hall, Louisville, Kentucky
Attendance: 18,669
