= 1968–69 Wisconsin Badgers men's basketball team =

American college basketball season

1968–69 Wisconsin Badgers men's basketball
- Conference: Big Ten Conference
- Record: 11–13 (5–9 Big Ten)
- Head coach: John Powless
- Home arena: UW Fieldhouse

1968–69 Big Ten Conference men's basketball standings
	Conf.				Overall
Team	W		L	PCT	W		L	PCT
No. 6 Purdue	13	–	1	.929	23	–	5	.821
No. 20 Illinois	9	–	5	.643	19	–	5	.792
Ohio State	9	–	5	.643	17	–	7	.708
Michigan	7	–	7	.500	13	–	11	.542
Northwestern	6	–	8	.429	14	–	10	.583
Minnesota	6	–	8	.429	12	–	12	.500
Michigan State	6	–	8	.429	11	–	12	.478
Iowa	5	–	9	.357	12	–	12	.500
Wisconsin	5	–	9	.357	11	–	13	.458
Indiana	4	–	10	.286	9	–	15	.375
Rankings from AP Poll

The 1968–69 Wisconsin Badgers men's basketball team represented University of Wisconsin–Madison. The head coach was John Powless, who coached his first season with the Badgers. The team played their home games at the UW Fieldhouse in Madison, Wisconsin and was a member of the Big Ten Conference.

== Roster ==
1968–69 Wisconsin Badgers men's basketball team
Players	Coaches
Pos. / # / Name / Height / Weight / Year / Hometown	Head coach: John Powless; Assistant coach(es) Legend: (C) Team captain; (S) Suspended; (I) Ineligible; (W) Walk-on; Injured; Current redshirt

== Schedule ==
Date time, TV	Rank^{#}	Opponent^{#}	Result	Record	Site city, state
Regular Season
11/30/1968*		at Nebraska	L 55–68	0–1	Nebraska Coliseum; Lincoln, NE
12/03/1968*		No. 4 Kansas	W 67–62	1–1	UW Fieldhouse; Madison, WI
12/07/1968*		North Dakota	W 94–48	2–1	UW Fieldhouse; Madison, WI
12/11/1968*		at No. 7 Notre Dame	L 56–57	2–2	Athletic & Convocation Center; Notre Dame, IN
12/14/1968*		Northern Illinois	W 69–67	3–2	UW Fieldhouse; Madison, WI
12/21/1968*		at Florida	L 66–71	3–3	Florida Gymnasium; Gainesville, FL
12/27/1968*		vs. Ohio; Milwaukee Classic	W 74–68	4–3	Milwaukee Arena; Milwaukee, WI
12/28/1968*		vs. Marquette; Milwaukee Classic	L 56–59	4–4	Milwaukee Arena; Milwaukee, WI
12/31/1968*		vs. No. 3 Kentucky	W 69–65	5–4	Chicago Stadium; Chicago, IL
1/04/1969		Purdue	L 80–86	5–5 (0–1)	UW Fieldhouse; Madison, WI
1/07/1969		at Michigan State	L 67–77	5–6 (0–2)	Jenison Fieldhouse; East Lansing, MI
1/11/1969		at No. 16 Ohio State	L 69–84	5–7 (0–3)	St. John Arena; Columbus, OH
1/14/1969		Minnesota	W 68–61	6–7 (1–3)	UW Fieldhouse; Madison, WI
1/28/1969*		No. 16 Marquette	W 56–50	7–7	UW Fieldhouse; Madison, WI
2/01/1969		at No. 7 Illinois	L 73–86	7–8 (1–4)	Assembly Hall; Champaign, IL
2/04/1969		Indiana	L 63–65	7–9 (1–5)	UW Fieldhouse; Madison, WI
2/08/1969		No. 12 Ohio State	W 77–73	8–9 (2–5)	UW Fieldhouse; Madison, WI
2/11/1969		at Minnesota	W 69–63	9–9 (3–5)	Williams Arena; Minneapolis, MN
2/15/1969		at No. 8 Purdue	L 69–87	9–10 (3–6)	Purdue Arena; West Lafayette, IN
2/22/1969		Michigan State	W 76–64	10–10 (4–6)	UW Fieldhouse; Madison, WI
2/25/1969		at Indiana	L 84–101	10–11 (4–7)	New Fieldhouse; Bloomington, IN
3/01/1969		at Michigan	L 79–84	10–12 (4–8)	University Events Building; Ann Arbor, MI
3/04/1969		Northwestern	L 70–72	10–13 (4–9)	UW Fieldhouse; Madison, WI
3/08/1969		Iowa	W 84–74	11–13 (5–9)	UW Fieldhouse; Madison, WI
*Non-conference game. ^{#}Rankings from AP Poll. (#) Tournament seedings in parentheses.
