= 1968–69 Illinois Fighting Illini men's basketball team =

American college basketball season

1968–69 Illinois Fighting Illini men's basketball

Hurricane Classic, Champion
- Conference: Big Ten Conference

Ranking
- AP: No. 20
- Record: 19–5 (9–5 Big Ten)
- Head coach: Harv Schmidt (2nd season)
- Assistant coaches: Dick Campbell (2nd season); Jim Wright (10th season)
- MVP: Dave Scholz
- Captain: Dave Scholz
- Home arena: Assembly Hall

1968–69 Big Ten Conference men's basketball standings
	Conf.				Overall
Team	W		L	PCT	W		L	PCT
No. 6 Purdue	13	–	1	.929	23	–	5	.821
No. 20 Illinois	9	–	5	.643	19	–	5	.792
Ohio State	9	–	5	.643	17	–	7	.708
Michigan	7	–	7	.500	13	–	11	.542
Northwestern	6	–	8	.429	14	–	10	.583
Minnesota	6	–	8	.429	12	–	12	.500
Michigan State	6	–	8	.429	11	–	12	.478
Iowa	5	–	9	.357	12	–	12	.500
Wisconsin	5	–	9	.357	11	–	13	.458
Indiana	4	–	10	.286	9	–	15	.375
Rankings from AP Poll

The 1968–69 Illinois Fighting Illini men's basketball team represented the University of Illinois.

== Regular season ==
In only his second season as the Head coach of the Fighting Illini, Harv Schmidt guided his basketball team to a high-point of an Associated Press ranking of number 4 by the beginning of January, 1969. Schmidt and his Illini won their first ten games of the season with the single biggest win occurring December 21, 1968, as they stopped the Houston Cougars' 60 game home winning streak, 97–84. After the win, the Illini, just two days short of two years after the original "Slush Fund" announcement, appeared to be back in their prime. During the season the Illini defeated a total of 4 top 20 teams, including a tenth ranked Ohio State in February. Like so many years before, the Illini's only losses came at the hands of the competition provided by the other teams within the Big Ten Conference. The team completed the season with only 5 losses, all coming within the league. The final totals were 19 wins overall with 9 of those wins coming within the conference. The team was led in scoring for the season by Dave Scholz, Greg Jackson, Mike Price and Jodie Harrison. Scholz would finish his senior season by being named 1st team All-American by the Helms Foundation, 3rd team All-American by the Associated Press and to the Converse honorable mention All-American team. The Fighting Illini would go on to finish the season with a 19-5 overall record and tied for 2nd place in the conference with a 9–5 record.

The 1968-69 team's starting lineup included Scholz and Fred Miller at the forward spots, Price and Harrison as guards and Jackson at center.

=== Roster ===
1968–69 Illinois Fighting Illini men's basketball team
Players
Coaches

Pos.	#	Name	Height	Weight	Year	Previous school	Hometown
G	10	Rick Howat	6 ft 2 in (1.88 m)	160 lb (73 kg)	So	Downers Grove North High School	Downers Grove, Illinois
G	11	Bob Windmiller	6 ft 0 in (1.83 m)	175 lb (79 kg)	So	Ossian High School	Ossian, Indiana
F	14	Fred Miller	6 ft 4 in (1.93 m)	195 lb (88 kg)	So	Pekin High School	Pekin, Illinois
G/F	15	Mike Price	6 ft 3 in (1.91 m)	195 lb (88 kg)	Jr	Arsenal Technical High School	Indianapolis, Indiana
F	20	Brad Richardson	6 ft 4 in (1.93 m)	210 lb (95 kg)	So	East Richland High School	Olney, Illinois
F	30	Randy Crews	6 ft 5 in (1.96 m)	220 lb (100 kg)	Jr	Bradley-Bourbonnais Community High School	Kankakee, Illinois
C	31	Greg Jackson	6 ft 8 in (2.03 m)	255 lb (116 kg)	So	St. Philip High School	Chicago, Illinois
G	32	Les Busboom	6 ft 4 in (1.93 m)	195 lb (88 kg)	Sr	St. Joseph-Ogden High School	Royal, Illinois
G	33	Jodie Harrison	6 ft 3 in (1.91 m)	195 lb (88 kg)	Sr	Streator High School	Streator, Illinois
G/F	34	Denny Pace	6 ft 3 in (1.91 m)	175 lb (79 kg)	Sr	Collinsville High School	Collinsville, Illinois
F/C	40	Dave Scholz (C)	6 ft 8 in (2.03 m)	220 lb (100 kg)	Sr	Stephen Decatur High School	Decatur, Illinois
G	43	Bob Shapland	6 ft 2 in (1.88 m)	180 lb (82 kg)	So	Central High School	Champaign, Illinois
G	44	Ron Armbrust	6 ft 1 in (1.85 m)	180 lb (82 kg)	Jr	Lincoln High School	Lincoln, Illinois

Head coach

- Harv Schmidt (University of Illinois) (2nd year)

Assistant coach(es)

- Dick Campbell (2nd year)
- Jim Wright (University of Illinois) (10th year)

Legend

- (C) Team captain
- (S) Suspended
- (I) Ineligible
- (W) Walk-on
- Injured
- Current redshirt

Roster

== Schedule ==
Date time, TV	Rank^{#}	Opponent^{#}	Result	Record	Site (attendance) city, state
Non-Conference regular season
12/2/1968*		Butler	W 105-66	1-0	Assembly Hall (11,833); Champaign, IL
12/6/1968*		at Creighton	W 69-66	2-0	Omaha Civic Auditorium (9,240); Omaha, NE
12/9/1968*		North Dakota	W 83-51	3-0	Assembly Hall (11,795); Champaign, IL
12/14/1968*		Iowa State	W 75-48	4-0	Assembly Hall (10,051); Champaign, IL
12/17/1968*		Ohio	W 95-82	5-0	Assembly Hall (10,031); Champaign, IL
12/19/1968*		Tulane	W 105-71	6-0	Assembly Hall (10,252); Champaign, IL
12/21/1968*		at No. 20 Houston	W 97-84	7-0	Hofheinz Pavilion (5,200); Houston, TX
12/27/1968*	No. 12	vs. Creighton; Hurricane Classic	W 90-77	8-0	Miami Beach Convention Center (2,093); Miami, FL
12/28/1968*	No. 12	at Miami (FL); Hurricane Classic	W 86-76	9-0	Miami Beach Convention Center (2,486); Miami, FL
Big Ten regular season
1/4/1969	No. 8	Minnesota	W 80-58	10-0 (1-0)	Assembly Hall (16,128); Champaign, IL
1/7/1969	No. 4	at Purdue	L 84-98	10-1 (1-1)	Mackey Arena (14,123); West Lafayette, IN
1/11/1969	No. 4	at No. 12 Northwestern; Rivalry	W 82-77 ^{OT}	11-1 (2-1)	McGaw Memorial Hall (8,388); Evanston, IL
1/25/1969*	No. 8	vs. No. 15 Notre Dame	L 83-86	12-1	Chicago Stadium (18,000); Chicago, IL
1/28/1969	No. 7	at No. 12 Ohio State	L 67-76	12-2 (2-2)	St. John Arena (13,374); Columbus, OH
2/1/1969	No. 7	Wisconsin	W 86-73	13-2 (3-2)	Assembly Hall (15,740); Champaign, IL
2/8/1969	No. 10	Iowa; Rivalry	W 98-69	14-2 (4-2)	Assembly Hall (16,128); Champaign, IL
2/11/1969	No. 10	at Michigan	L 87-92	14-3 (4-3)	Crisler Arena (8,113); Ann Arbor, MI
2/15/1969	No. 10	at Michigan State	L 70-75	14-4 (4-4)	Jenison Fieldhouse (7,020); East Lansing, MI
2/18/1969	No. 19	No. 10 Ohio State	W 73-57	15-4 (5-4)	Assembly Hall (16,128); Champaign, IL
2/23/1969	No. 19	Michigan	W 100-92	16-4 (6-4)	Assembly Hall (16,128); Champaign, IL
2/25/1969	No. 15	at Iowa; Rivalry	L 53-74	16-5 (6-5)	Iowa Field House (13,700); Iowa City, IA
3/1/1969	No. 15	at Indiana; Rivalry	W 77-64	17-5 (7-5)	New Fieldhouse (5,425); Bloomington, IN
3/4/1969	No. 20	Michigan State	W 71-57	18-5 (8-5)	Assembly Hall (14,912); Champaign, IL
3/8/1969	No. 20	Northwestern; Rivalry	W 78-68	19-5 (9-5)	Assembly Hall (16,128); Champaign, IL
*Non-conference game. ^{#}Rankings from AP Poll. (#) Tournament seedings in parentheses. All times are in Central Time.

== Player stats ==
Player	Games played	Field goals	Free throws	Rebounds	Points
Dave Scholz	24	181	97	209	459
Greg Jackson	24	163	68	200	394
Mike Price	24	120	58	163	298
Jodie Harrison	24	87	80	96	254
Fred Miller	22	44	55	64	254
Denny Pace	24	56	27	86	139
Randy Crews	24	43	46	82	132
Rick Howat	22	34	10	14	78
Bob Windmiller	15	23	10	14	56
Les Busboom	10	5	6	11	16
Bob Shapland	8	3	0	3	6
Brad Richardson	8	1	3	10	5

== Awards and honors ==
- Dave Scholz
  - Team Most Valuable Player
  - 1st team All-American (Helms)
  - 3rd team All-American (AP)
  - Honorable Mention All-American (Converse)

== Team players drafted into the NBA ==
Player	NBA club	Round	Pick
Steve Kuberski*	Boston Celtics	4	9
Dave Scholz	Philadelphia 76ers	4	13
Rich Jones*	Phoenix Suns	5	1
Jodie Harrison	Baltimore Bullets	15	6

*Kuberski transferred to Bradley to finish his eligibility due to the "Slush-Fund" scandal of 1966.
*Jones transferred to Memphis State to finish his eligibility due to the "Slush-Fund" scandal of 1966.
