= 1968–69 Indiana Hoosiers men's basketball team =

American college basketball season

1968–69 Indiana Hoosiers men's basketball
- Conference: Big Ten Conference
- Record: 9–15 (4–10 Big Ten)
- Head coach: Lou Watson (4th season)
- Assistant coach: Tom Bolyard
- Captain: Bill DeHeer
- Home arena: New Fieldhouse

1968–69 Big Ten Conference men's basketball standings
	Conf.				Overall
Team	W		L	PCT	W		L	PCT
No. 6 Purdue	13	–	1	.929	23	–	5	.821
No. 20 Illinois	9	–	5	.643	19	–	5	.792
Ohio State	9	–	5	.643	17	–	7	.708
Michigan	7	–	7	.500	13	–	11	.542
Northwestern	6	–	8	.429	14	–	10	.583
Minnesota	6	–	8	.429	12	–	12	.500
Michigan State	6	–	8	.429	11	–	12	.478
Iowa	5	–	9	.357	12	–	12	.500
Wisconsin	5	–	9	.357	11	–	13	.458
Indiana	4	–	10	.286	9	–	15	.375
Rankings from AP Poll

The 1968–69 Indiana Hoosiers men's basketball team represented Indiana University. Their head coach was Lou Watson, who was in his 4th year. The team played its home games in New Fieldhouse in Bloomington, Indiana, and was a member of the Big Ten Conference.

The Hoosiers finished the regular season with an overall record of 9–15 and a conference record of 4–10, finishing 10th in the Big Ten Conference. Indiana was not invited to play in any postseason tournament.

== Roster ==
No.	Name	Position	Ht.	Year	Hometown
20	Mike Niles	G	6–4	Jr.	Warsaw, Indiana
22	Joe Cooke	G	6–3	Jr.	Toledo, Ohio
23	Larry Gipson	G	5–10	So.	Michigan City, Indiana
24	Ken Morgan	F	6–6	So.	Indianapolis, Indiana
25	Jeff Stocksdale	F	6–4	So.	Lima, Ohio
31	Bill DeHeer	C	6–9	Sr.	Maplewood, Missouri
32	Mike Noland	F	6–6	Jr.	Indianapolis, Indiana
33	Ken Johnson	C	6–6	Jr.	Anderson, Indiana
34	Ben Niles	G	6–5	So.	Warsaw, Indiana
35	Bill Stenberg	C	6–7	Sr.	Rockford, Illinois
40	Kevin Bass	G	5–10	So.	Morristown, Indiana
41	Gabe Oliverio	G	6–2	Sr.	Annandale, Virginia
42	Rick Atkinson	G	6–3	Jr.	Evansville, Indiana
43	John Muirhead	C	6–7	Sr.	Danville, Illinois
44	Earl Schneider	F	6–9	Sr.	Evansville, Indiana
45	Mike Branaugh	C	6–8	Jr.	Toledo, Ohio
54	Mike Szymanczyk	C	6–8	So.	Lansing, Illinois

== Schedule/results ==
Date time, TV	Rank^{#}	Opponent^{#}	Result	Record	Site city, state
Regular season
12/3/1968*		at Ohio	L 70–80	0–1	Convocation Center; Athens, OH
12/7/1968*		Missouri	W 58–51	1–1	New Fieldhouse; Bloomington, IN
12/9/1968*		at Kansas State	L 83–87	1–2	Ahearn Field House; Manhattan, KS
12/14/1968*		North Carolina State	W 77–62	2–2	New Fieldhouse; Bloomington, IN
12/16/1968*		Loyola (Chicago)	W 88–83	3–2	New Fieldhouse; Bloomington, IN
12/21/1968*		at No. 7 Notre Dame	L 94–104	3–3	Joyce Center; Notre Dame, IN
12/27/1968*		vs. Niagara; ECAC Quaker City Tournament First Round	W 86–83	4–3	The Spectrum; Philadelphia, PA
12/28/1968*		vs. No. 17 La Salle; ECAC Quaker City Tournament Semifinals	L 88–108	4–4	The Spectrum; Philadelphia, PA
12/30/1968*		vs. St. Joseph's (Pa.); ECAC Quaker City Tournament Third Place Game	L 72–80	4–5	The Spectrum; Philadelphia, PA
1/4/1969		No. 13 Ohio State	L 82–90	4–6 (0–1)	New Fieldhouse; Bloomington, IN
1/7/1969		at Michigan	L 87–89	4–7 (0–2)	University Events Building; Ann Arbor, MI
1/11/1969		at Iowa	L 72–91	4–8 (0–3)	Iowa Field House; Iowa City, IA
1/14/1969		No. 17 Northwestern	W 87–70	5–8 (1–3)	New Fieldhouse; Bloomington, IN
1/27/1969*		DePaul	W 87–66	6–8 (1–3)	New Fieldhouse; Bloomington, IN
2/1/1969		Michigan State	W 79–76	7–8 (2–3)	New Fieldhouse; Bloomington, IN
2/4/1969		at Wisconsin	W 65–63	8–8 (3–3)	Wisconsin Field House; Madison, WI
2/8/1969		Minnesota	L 83–89	8–9 (3–4)	New Fieldhouse; Bloomington, IN
2/15/1969		at Northwestern	L 88–91	8–10 (3–5)	Welsh-Ryan Arena; Evanston, IL
2/18/1969		No. 9 Purdue; Rivalry	L 95–96	8–11 (3–6)	New Fieldhouse; Bloomington, IN
2/22/1969		at Minnesota	L 79–83	8–12 (3–7)	Williams Arena; Minneapolis, MN
2/25/1969		Wisconsin	W 101–84	9–12 (4–7)	New Fieldhouse; Bloomington, IN
3/1/1969		No. 15 Illinois; Rivalry	L 64–77	9–13 (4–8)	New Fieldhouse; Bloomington, IN
3/4/1969		at Ohio State	L 86–108	9–14 (4–9)	St. John Arena; Columbus, OH
3/8/1969		at Purdue; Rivalry	L 76–120	9–15 (4–10)	Purdue Arena; West Lafayette, IN
*Non-conference game. ^{#}Rankings from AP Poll. (#) Tournament seedings in parentheses.
