= Tay Baker =

American basketball player and coach (1927–2026)

Biographical details
- Born: September 24, 1927; Hamilton, Ohio, U.S.
- Died: September 29, 2026 (aged 99)

Playing career
- 1947–1950: Cincinnati

Coaching career (HC unless noted)
- 1959–1965: Cincinnati (assistant)
- 1965–1972: Cincinnati
- 1973–1979: Xavier

Head coaching record
- Overall: 195–149
- Tournaments: 0–1 (NCAA Division I); 0–1 (NIT)

Accomplishments and honors

Awards
- MVC Coach of the Year (1966)

Taylor Baker (September 24, 1927 – September 29, 2026) was an American college basketball coach for the Cincinnati Bearcats and Xavier Musketeers.

== Biography ==
Baker was born on September 24, 1927. He played basketball at Hamilton High School in Hamilton, Ohio, graduating in 1945. He played college basketball for the University of Cincinnati Bearcats, beginning as a freshman in 1947. After only three games, he began an 18-month stint in the U.S. Army. Returning to Cincinnati, he was a top reserve for the first two Bearcats teams to win 20 games: 23–5 in 1949 and, as a senior, 20–6 in 1950. The Bearcats were champions of the Mid-American Conference (MAC) in each season from 1948-1950.

After graduating, Baker worked as a teacher and coach at three southwestern Ohio high schools—first at Lebanon High School, then Wyoming High School and Miamisburg High School.

In 1959, he returned to Cincinnati as an assistant coach under coach George Smith, a post he retained the next season when Smith became the athletic director and Ed Jucker took over as head coach. After an assistant coaching career that included four Final Fours and two NCAA championships for the Bearcats, Baker succeeded Jucker as head coach in 1965.

His first team, in 1965–66, won the Missouri Valley Conference (MVC) title and played in the NCAA Tournament, where they were defeated 78-76 in overtime by eventual national champion Texas Western (now UTEP), which famously was the first team to win the title starting five African-American players. Baker's Bearcats returned to the postseason again in 1970, losing in the first round of the NIT to Bob Knight's Army team. After posting a 17–9 record in 1971–72, Baker resigned as UC coach. In seven seasons coaching the Bearcats, Baker posted a record of 125–60.

He moved to crosstown rival Xavier University in 1973, where he went 70–89 over six seasons.

Baker later served as executive director and board member of the non-profit Greater Cincinnati Golf Association which, among other functions, runs the local USGA qualifying tournaments.

He was inducted into the University of Cincinnati Athletics Hall of Fame in 1996, the Lebanon High School Athletic Hall of Fame in 2017, and the Ohio Basketball Hall of Fame in 2025.

Baker died on September 29, 2026, five days after his 99th birthday.

== Head coaching record ==
Record table
Season	Team	Overall	Conference	Standing	Postseason
Cincinnati Bearcats (Missouri Valley Conference) (1965–1970)
1965–66	Cincinnati	21–7	10–4	1st	NCAA Sweet Sixteen
1966–67	Cincinnati	17–9	6–8	4th	
1967–68	Cincinnati	18–8	11–5	3rd	
1968–69	Cincinnati	17–9	8–8	4th	
1969–70	Cincinnati	21–6	12–4	2nd	NIT first round
Cincinnati Bearcats (Independent) (1970–1972)
1970–71	Cincinnati	14–12			
1971–72	Cincinnati	17–9			
Cincinnati:		125–60 (.676)	47–29 (.618)		
Xavier Musketeers (Independent) (1973–1979)
1973–74	Xavier	8–18			
1974–75	Xavier	11–15			
1975–76	Xavier	14–12			
1976–77	Xavier	10–17			
1977–78	Xavier	13–18			
1978–79	Xavier	14–13			
Xavier:		70–89 (.440)			
Total:		195–149 (.567)			
National champion Postseason invitational champion Conference regular season champion Conference regular season and conference tournament champion Division regular season champion Division regular season and conference tournament champion Conference tournament champion
