= 1968–69 Purdue Boilermakers men's basketball team =

American college basketball season

1968–69 Purdue Boilermakers men's basketball

NCAA Tournament, runner-up Big Ten champions

National Championship Game, L 72-92 vs. UCLA
- Conference: Big Ten Conference

Ranking
- Coaches: No. 7
- AP: No. 6
- Record: 23–5 (13–1 Big Ten)
- Head coach: George King
- Assistant coaches: Bob King; Joe Sexson; Dave Toney
- Home arena: Mackey Arena

1968–69 Big Ten Conference men's basketball standings
| | Conf. | | | | Overall |
| Team | W | | L | PCT | W | | L | PCT |
|---|---|---|---|---|---|---|---|---|
| No. 6 Purdue | 13 | – | 1 | .929 | 23 | – | 5 | .821 |
| No. 20 Illinois | 9 | – | 5 | .643 | 19 | – | 5 | .792 |
| Ohio State | 9 | – | 5 | .643 | 17 | – | 7 | .708 |
| Michigan | 7 | – | 7 | .500 | 13 | – | 11 | .542 |
| Northwestern | 6 | – | 8 | .429 | 14 | – | 10 | .583 |
| Minnesota | 6 | – | 8 | .429 | 12 | – | 12 | .500 |
| Michigan State | 6 | – | 8 | .429 | 11 | – | 12 | .478 |
| Iowa | 5 | – | 9 | .357 | 12 | – | 12 | .500 |
| Wisconsin | 5 | – | 9 | .357 | 11 | – | 13 | .458 |
| Indiana | 4 | – | 10 | .286 | 9 | – | 15 | .375 |
Rankings from AP Poll

The 1968–69 Purdue Boilermakers men's basketball team represented Purdue University during the 1968–69 NCAA men's college basketball season.

== Roster ==
1968–69 Purdue Boilermakers men's basketball team
Players
Coaches

| Pos. | # | Name | Height | Weight | Year | Previous school | Hometown |
|---|---|---|---|---|---|---|---|
| C | 54 | Chuck Bavis | 7 ft 0 in (2.13 m) | — | Sr | Garrett | Garrett, IN |
| F | 13 | Tyrone Bedford | — | — |
| F | 33 | George Faerber | 6 ft 5 in (1.96 m) | — | So |
| F | 30 | Herm Gilliam | 6 ft 3 in (1.91 m) | — | Sr |
| C | 31 | Jerry Johnson | 6 ft 10 in (2.08 m) | — | | Knox | Knox, IN |
| C | 32 | Frank Kaufman | — | — |
| G | 24 | Bill Keller | 5 ft 11 in (1.8 m) | — | Sr | Washington | Indianapolis |
| G | 25 | Steve Longfellow | — | — |
| G | 10 | Rick Mount | 6 ft 4 in (1.93 m) | — | Jr | Lebanon | Lebanon, IN |
| F | 40 | Ralph Taylor | — | — | Sr | Washington | Indianapolis |
| G | 45 | Larry Weatherford | — | — | So | Bosse | Evansville, IN |

Head coach

- George King (Charleston)

Assistant coach(es)

- Joe Sexson (Purdue)
- Bob King (Butler)
- Dave Toney

Legend

- (C) Team captain
- (S) Suspended
- (I) Ineligible
- (W) Walk-on
- Injured
- Current redshirt

Roster
Last update: 2016-Mar-06

== Schedule and results ==
| Date time, TV | Rank^{#} | Opponent^{#} | Result | Record | Site city, state |
Non-conference regular season
| November 30* | No. 10 | at No. 1 UCLA | L 82–94 | 0–1 | Pauley Pavilion; Los Angeles |
| December 5* | No. 14 | North Dakota | W 116–84 | 1–1 | Mackey Arena; West Lafayette, IN |
| December 7* | No. 14 | Miami (OH) | W 78–70 | 2–1 | Mackey Arena; West Lafayette, IN |
| December 10* | No. 13 | Butler | W 93–55 | 3–1 | Mackey Arena; West Lafayette, IN |
| December 14* | No. 13 | Ohio | W 100–89 | 4–1 | Mackey Arena; West Lafayette, IN |
| December 20* | No. 12 | vs. No. 15 California; Sun Devil Classic | W 98–91 | 5–1 | Sun Devil Gymnasium; Tempe, AZ |
| December 21* | No. 12 | at Arizona State; Sun Devil Classic | L 80–85 | 5–2 | Sun Devil Gymnasium; Tempe, AZ |
| December 27* | No. 18 | vs. Arizona; Rainbow Classic | W 98–72 | 6–2 | Neal S. Blaisdell Center; Honolulu, HI |
| December 28* | No. 18 | vs. Columbia; Rainbow Classic | L 74–78 | 6–3 | Neal S. Blaisdell Center; Honolulu, HI |
| December 29* | No. 18 | at Hawaii; Rainbow Classic | W 97–68 | 7–3 | Neal S. Blaisdell Center; Honolulu, HI |
Big Ten regular season
| January 4 | | at Wisconsin | W 86–80 | 8–3 (1–0) | Wisconsin Field House; Madison, WI |
| January 7 | | No. 4 Illinois | W 98–84 | 9–3 (2–0) | Mackey Arena; West Lafayette, IN |
| January 25 | No. 18 | at Minnesota | W 102–79 | 10–3 (3–0) | Williams Arena; Minneapolis, MN |
| February 1 | No. 14 | No. 12 Ohio State | W 95–85 | 11–3 (4–0) | Mackey Arena; West Lafayette, IN |
| February 4 | No. 9 | Iowa | W 99–87 | 12–3 (5–0) | Mackey Arena; West Lafayette, IN |
| February 8 | No. 9 | at Northwestern | W 97–85 | 13–3 (6–0) | Welsh-Ryan Arena; Evanston, IL |
| February 11 | No. 8 | at No. 16 Ohio State | L 85–88 | 13–4 (6–1) | St. John Arena; Columbus, OH |
| February 15 | No. 8 | Wisconsin | W 87–69 | 14–4 (7–1) | Mackey Arena; West Lafayette, IN |
| February 18 | No. 9 | at Indiana; Rivalry | W 96–95 | 15–4 (8–1) | Assembly Hall; Bloomington, IN |
| February 22 | No. 9 | Northwestern | W 107–68 | 16–4 (9–1) | Mackey Arena; West Lafayette, IN |
| February 25 | No. 9 | at Michigan State | W 74–72 | 17–4 (10–1) | Jenison Fieldhouse; East Lansing, MI |
| February 28 | No. 9 | at Iowa | W 97–85 | 18–4 (11–1) | Iowa Field House; Iowa City, IA |
| March 4 | No. 6 | Michigan | W 116–87 | 19–4 (12–1) | Mackey Arena; West Lafayette, IN |
| March 8 | No. 6 | Indiana | W 120–76 | 20–4 (13–1) | Mackey Arena; West Lafayette, IN |
NCAA Tournament
| March 13* | No. 6 | vs. Miami (OH); NCAA tournament • Regional semifinal | W 91–71 | 21–4 | Wisconsin Field House; Madison, WI |
| March 15* | No. 6 | vs. Marquette; NCAA Tournament • Regional Final | W 75–73 ^{OT} | 22–4 | Wisconsin Field House; Madison, WI |
| March 20* | No. 6 | vs. No. 4 North Carolina; NCAA Tournament • National semifinals | W 92–65 | 23–4 | Freedom Hall; Louisville, KY |
| March 22* | No. 6 | vs. No. 1 UCLA; NCAA Tournament • National Final | L 72–92 | 23–5 | Freedom Hall; Louisville, KY |
*Non-conference game. ^{#}Rankings from AP Poll. (#) Tournament seedings in parentheses. ME=Mideast.

== Awards and honors ==
Highest scoring team in the nation

Rick Mount—1st Team All-America

Rick Mount—Big Ten Conference Player of the year

== Team players drafted into the NBA ==
| Round | Pick | Player | NBA club |
|---|---|---|---|
| 1 | 8 | Herm Gilliam | Cincinnati Royals |
| 7 | 86 | Bill Keller | Milwaukee Bucks |
