= 1968–69 Drake Bulldogs men's basketball team =

American college basketball season

1968–69 Drake Bulldogs men's basketball

Missouri Valley Conference Co-Champions

NCAA tournament Third Place vs. North Carolina, W, 104–84
- Conference: Missouri Valley Conference

Ranking
- Coaches: No. 11
- AP: No. 11
- Record: 26–5 (13–3 MVC)
- Head coach: Maury John (11th season)
- Assistant coaches: Dan Callahan; Gus Guydon
- Home arena: Veterans Memorial Auditorium

1968–69 Missouri Valley Conference men's basketball standings
	Conf.				Overall
Team	W		L	PCT	W		L	PCT
No. 11 Drake	13	–	3	.813	26	–	5	.839
No. 15 Louisville	13	–	3	.813	21	–	6	.778
Tulsa	11	–	5	.688	19	–	8	.704
Cincinnati	8	–	8	.500	17	–	9	.654
North Texas State	8	–	8	.500	15	–	10	.600
Bradley	7	–	9	.438	14	–	12	.538
Wichita State	7	–	9	.438	11	–	15	.423
Saint Louis	5	–	11	.313	6	–	20	.231
Memphis State	0	–	16	.000	6	–	19	.240
Rankings from AP Poll

The 1968–69 Drake Bulldogs men's basketball team represented Drake University in the 1968–69 college basketball season. The team was led by eleventh-year head coach Maury John. In 1967–68, the Bulldogs finished 18–8 (9–7 in the Missouri Valley Conference). They were also trying to make their first NCAA tournament appearance since as well as their first postseason appearance since their National Invitation Tournament appearance in 1964.

== Regular season ==
The Bulldogs were 12–1 at home as well as 8–3 on the road and 6–1 at neutral locations. With their third-place finish in the NCAA Tournament Drake had their best NCAA finish up to that point, and as of the start of the 2022–2023 season. On December 27–28, 1968 Drake played in the Dallas Classic in Dallas, Texas against Minnesota and Southern Methodist. Drake was ranked in the AP Top 20 Poll on several occasions during the season. Drake was ranked 18th during the week of January 7, 1969. Drake was once again ranked 11th on March 4, 1969. On March 8, 1969, Drake won a MVC playoff game 77–73 in Wichita, Kansas to determine the conference champion. A documentary on the 1968–69 Drake Basketball team was made in 2004 by filmmaker Jacob Adams of Impossible Productions and is available from his website. Most of the UCLA—Drake game was recreated with an old coach's film and radio play by play. Intercut are commentaries by Drake players and coaches.

== Missouri Valley Conference standings ==
#	Team	Conference	Pct.	Overall	Pct.
1	Drake	13–3	.813	26–5	.839
2	Louisville	13–3	.813	21–6	.778
3	Tulsa	11–5	.688	19–8	.704
4	Cincinnati	8–8	.500	17–9	.654
5	North Texas State	8–8	.500	15–10	.600
6	Bradley	7–9	.438	14–12	.539
7	Wichita State	7–9	.438	11–15	.423
8	Saint Louis	5–11	.313	6–19	.240
9	Memphis State	0–16	.000	6–19	.240

== Roster ==
Note: Flags indicate national team eligibility at FIBA sanctioned events. Players may hold other non-FIBA nationality not displayed.

No.		Position	Player
5	(United States)	F	Dolph Pulliam
32	(United States)	G	Don Draper
12	(United States)	F/G	Ron Gwin
31	(United States)	G	Bob Mast
15	(United States)	G	Willie McCarter
??	(United States)	C	Jim O'Dea
??	(United States)	C	Garry Odom
?3	(United States)	C	Larry Sharp

No.		Position	Player
42	(United States)	F	Willie Wise
34	(United States)	F	Dale Teeter
43	(United States)	C	Rick Wanamaker
41	(United States)	F	Al Williams
22	(United States)	G	Gary Zeller
24	(United States)	F	Jim Nordrum
10	(United States)	G	Al Sakys
21	(United States)	G	Dave Wicklund

== Player statistics ==
Note: GP= Games played; RPG = Rebounds per Game; PPG = Points per Game

Player	GP	RPG	PPG
Willie McCarter	31	3.7	20.4
Willie Wise	30	11.4	14.6
Dolph Pulliam	31	7.7	13.2
Don Draper	31	2.4	12.2
Al Williams	31	7.2	8.8
Gary Zeller	31	1.6	6.3
Rick Wanamaker	28	3.3	4.3
Gary Odom	30	4.4	3.7
Ron Gwin	25	1.3	2.6
Al Sakys	7	0.2	1.8
Larry Sharp	17	1.1	1.5
Others	31	0.6	2.7

== Schedule ==
MVC Standing: 1st
Date	Opponent*	Rank*	Location	Time^{#}	Result	Overall	Conference
**Regular Season Games**
December 2, 1968	Cal Poly Pomona		Des Moines, IA		W 118–79	1–0	0–0
December 7, 1968	St. Cloud State		Des Moines, IA		W 92–52	2–0	0–0
December 9, 1968	#20 Marquette		Des Moines, IA		W 68–63	3–0	0–0
December 14, 1968	Iowa		Des Moines, IA		W 89–74	4–0	0–0
December 19, 1968	Iowa State		State Gymnasium, Ames, IA		W 81–71	4–0	0–0
December 21, 1968	Nevada-Reno		Reno, NV		W 90–76	6–0	0–0
December 23, 1968	Pacific		Stockton, CA		L 75–77	6–1	0–0
December 27, 1968	Minnesota		Moody Coliseum, University Park, TX		W 71–48	7–1	0–0
December 28, 1968	SMU		Moody Coliseum, University Park, TX		W 86–81	8–1	0–0
January 2, 1969	**Memphis State**		Mid-South Coliseum, Memphis, TN		W 73–71	9–1	1–0
January 4, 1969	**Saint Louis**		Des Moines, IA		W 104–65	10–1	2–0
January 9, 1969	**Wichita State**	#18	Des Moines, IA		W 86–81	11–1	3–0
January 11, 1969	**Tulsa**	#18	Des Moines, IA		L 78–86	11–2	3–1
January 14, 1969	#19 **Cincinnati**		Armory Fieldhouse, Cincinnati, OH		W 69–64	12–2	4–1
January 23, 1969	**Bradley**		Des Moines, IA		W 93–76	13–2	5–1
January 25, 1969	**Louisville**		Freedom Hall, Louisville, KY		L 70–84	13–3	5–2
January 30, 1969	**North Texas State**		Denton, TX		L 99–118	13–4	5–3
February 1, 1969	**Memphis State**		Des Moines, IA		W 85–72	14–4	6–3
February 5, 1969	Iowa State		Des Moines, IA		W 94–71	15–4	6–3
February 11, 1969	**North Texas State**		Des Moines, IA		W 91–76	16–4	7–3
February 13, 1969	**Bradley**		Peoria, IL		W 91–76	17–4	8–3
February 20, 1969	**Wichita State**		Wichita Field House, Wichita, KS		W 120–94	18–4	9–3
February 22, 1969	#14 **Tulsa**		Tulsa, OK		W 87–78	19–4	10–3
February 23, 1969	**Cincinnati**		Des Moines, IA		W 85–68	20–4	11–3
March 1, 1969	#11 **Louisville**		Des Moines, IA		W 101–67	21–4	12–3
March 6, 1969	**Saint Louis**	#11	St. Louis, MO		W 93–78	22–4	13–3
March 8, 1969	#15 **Louisville**	#11	Wichita, KS		W 77–73	23–4	13–3
**NCAA tournament**
March 13, 1969	Texas A&M		Ahearn Field House, Manhattan, KS		W 81–63	24–4	13–3
March 15, 1969	Colorado State		Ahearn Field House, Manhattan, KS		W 84–77	25–4	13–3
March 20, 1969	UCLA		Freedom Hall, Louisville, KY		L 82–85	25–5	13–3
March 22, 1969	North Carolina		Freedom Hall, Louisville, KY		W 104–84	26–5	13–3
*Rank according to AP Top 20 Poll. ^{#}All times are in EST. Conference games in **BOLD**.

== NBA draft ==
Round	Pick	Player	NBA club
1	12	Willie McCarter	Los Angeles Lakers
5	64	Willie Wise	San Francisco Warriors
