= 1969 National Invitation Tournament =

Annual NCAA basketball competition

- Season: 1968–69
- Teams: 16
- Finals site: Madison Square Garden, New York City
- Champions: Temple Owls (2nd title)
- Runner-up: Boston College Eagles (1st title game)
- Semifinalists: Tennessee Volunteers (1st semifinal); Army Black Knights (4th semifinal)
- Winning coach: Harry Litwack (1st title)
- MVP: Terry Driscoll (Boston College)

The 1969 National Invitation Tournament was originated by the Metropolitan Basketball Writers Association in 1938. Responsibility for its administration was transferred two years later to local colleges, first known as the Metropolitan Intercollegiate Basketball Committee and in 1948, as the Metropolitan Intercollegiate Basketball Association (MIBA), which comprised representatives from five New York City schools: Fordham University, Manhattan College, New York University, St. John's University, and Wagner College. Originally all of the teams qualifying for the tournament were invited to New York City, and all games were played at Madison Square Garden.

Perennial power Kansas made its second—and as of 2026, most recent—NIT appearance.

== Selected teams ==
Below is a list of the 16 teams selected for the tournament.

- Army
- Boston College
- Florida
- Fordham
- Kansas
- Louisville
- Ohio
- Rutgers
- Saint Peter's
- South Carolina
- Southern Illinois
- Temple
- Tennessee
- Tulsa
- West Texas State
- Wyoming

== Bracket ==
Below is the tournament bracket.

First Round
Temple	82
Florida	66
Saint Peter's	75
Tulsa	71
Ohio	82
West Texas State	80
Tennessee	67
Rutgers	51
Army	51
Wyoming	49
South Carolina	72
Southern Illinois	63
Boston College	78
Kansas	62
Louisville	73
Fordham	70

Quarterfinals
Temple	94
Saint Peter's	78
Ohio	64
Tennessee	75
Army	59
South Carolina	45
Boston College	88
Louisville	83

Semifinals
Temple	63
Tennessee	58
Army	61
Boston College	73

Finals
Temple	89
Boston College	76
Third place game
Tennessee	64
Army	52

== See also ==
- 1969 NCAA University Division basketball tournament
- 1969 NCAA College Division basketball tournament
- 1969 NAIA Division I men's basketball tournament
- 1969 National Women's Invitational Tournament
