= 1968–69 Iowa Hawkeyes men's basketball team =

American college basketball season

1968–69 Iowa Hawkeyes men's basketball
- Conference: Big Ten Conference
- Record: 12–12 (5–9 Big Ten)
- Head coach: Ralph Miller (5th season)
- Assistant coaches: Lanny Van Eman; Dick Schultz
- MVP: John Johnson
- Home arena: Iowa Field House (Capacity: 13,365)

1968–69 Big Ten Conference men's basketball standings
	Conf.				Overall
Team	W		L	PCT	W		L	PCT
No. 6 Purdue	13	–	1	.929	23	–	5	.821
No. 20 Illinois	9	–	5	.643	19	–	5	.792
Ohio State	9	–	5	.643	17	–	7	.708
Michigan	7	–	7	.500	13	–	11	.542
Northwestern	6	–	8	.429	14	–	10	.583
Minnesota	6	–	8	.429	12	–	12	.500
Michigan State	6	–	8	.429	11	–	12	.478
Iowa	5	–	9	.357	12	–	12	.500
Wisconsin	5	–	9	.357	11	–	13	.458
Indiana	4	–	10	.286	9	–	15	.375
Rankings from AP Poll

The 1968–69 Iowa Hawkeyes men's basketball team represented the University of Iowa in intercollegiate basketball during the 1968–69 season. The team was led by Ralph Miller and played their home games at the Iowa Field House. The Hawkeyes finished the season 12–12 overall with a Big Ten conference record of 5–9.

== Roster ==
1968–69 Iowa Hawkeyes men's basketball team
Players
Coaches

Pos.	#	Name	Height	Weight	Year	Hometown
G	3	Jim Hodge	6 ft 0 in (1.83 m)	—	Jr
F/C	4	Dick Jensen	6 ft 8 in (2.03 m)	—	Jr	Madrid, Iowa
	10	George Conway	—	—	So
	11	Gary Lusk	—	—	Fr
F/C	14	Ben McGilmer	6 ft 7 in (2.01 m)	—	Jr
G	24	Chris Phillips	6 ft 3 in (1.91 m)	—	Sr
C	33	Tom Miller	6 ft 9 in (2.06 m)	—	So
	40	Omar Hazley	—	—	So
	42	Lynn Rowat	—	—	Fr
G	43	Chad Calabria	6 ft 1 in (1.85 m)	—	Jr	Aliquippa, Pennsylvania
F	44	Glenn Vidnovic	6 ft 5 in (1.96 m)	—	Jr	McKeesport, Pennsylvania
F	50	John Johnson	6 ft 7 in (2.01 m)	200 lb (91 kg)	Jr	Milwaukee, Wisconsin
	51	Joe Miranda	—	—	Jr
	52	Tom Schulze	—	—	Jr

Head coach

- Ralph Miller (Kansas)

Assistant coach(es)

Legend

- (C) Team captain
- (S) Suspended
- (I) Ineligible
- (W) Walk-on
- Injured
- Current redshirt

== Schedule/results ==
Date time, TV	Rank^{#}	Opponent^{#}	Result	Record	Site (attendance) city, state
Regular Season
Nov 30, 1968*		Cal Poly	W 91–73	1–0	Iowa Field House; Iowa City, IA
Dec 4, 1968*	No. 20	Northern Michigan	W 99–69	2–0	Iowa Field House; Iowa City, IA
Dec 7, 1968*	No. 20	Wisconsin-Milwaukee	W 116–80	3–0	Iowa Field House; Iowa City, IA
Dec 12, 1968*	No. 19	at Wichita State	L 88–93	3–1	Levitt Arena; Wichita, KS
Dec 14, 1968*	No. 19	at Drake	L 74–89	3–2	Veterans Memorial Auditorium; Des Moines, IA
Dec 19, 1968*		North Dakota	W 91–59	4–2	Iowa Field House; Iowa City, IA
Dec 21, 1968*		Creighton	W 100–73	5–2	Iowa Field House; Iowa City, IA
Dec 30, 1968*		at Houston; Sugar Bowl Tournament	W 95–87	6–2	Municipal Auditorium; New Orleans, LA
Dec 31, 1968*		vs. Duke; Sugar Bowl Tournament	L 82–85	6–3	Municipal Auditorium; New Orleans, LA
Jan 4, 1969		at Michigan	L 92–99	6–4 (0–1)	Crisler Arena; Ann Arbor, MI
Jan 11, 1969		Indiana	W 91–72	7–4 (1–1)	Iowa Field House; Iowa City, IA
Jan 14, 1969		Michigan State	W 77–76	8–4 (2–1)	Iowa Field House; Iowa City, IA
Jan 18, 1969		Minnesota	W 89–68	9–4 (3–1)	Iowa Field House; Iowa City, IA
Feb 1, 1969*		at No. 4 Davidson	W 76–61	10–4	Johnston Gym; Davidson, NC
Feb 4, 1969		at No. 9 Purdue	L 87–99	10–5 (3–2)	Mackey Arena; West Lafayette, IN
Feb 8, 1969		at No. 10 Illinois	L 69–98	10–6 (3–3)	Assembly Hall; Champaign, IL
Feb 11, 1969		Northwestern	W 84–80	11–6 (4–3)	Iowa Field House; Iowa City, IA
Feb 15, 1969		Michigan	L 85–86	11–7 (4–4)	Iowa Field House; Iowa City, IA
Feb 18, 1969		at Michigan State	L 60–78	11–8 (4–5)	Jenison Fieldhouse; East Lansing, MI
Feb 22, 1969		at No. 10 Ohio State	L 81–88	11–9 (4–6)	St. John Arena; Columbus, OH
Feb 25, 1969		No. 15 Illinois	W 74–53	12–9 (5–6)	Iowa Field House; Iowa City, IA
Mar 1, 1969		No. 9 Purdue	L 85–97	12–10 (5–7)	Iowa Field House; Iowa City, IA
Mar 4, 1969		at Minnesota	L 65–71	12–11 (5–8)	Williams Arena; Minneapolis, MN
Mar 8, 1969		at Wisconsin	L 74–84	12–12 (5–9)	Wisconsin Field House; Madison, WI
*Non-conference game. ^{#}Rankings from AP Poll. (#) Tournament seedings in parentheses.
