= Sonny Moran =

American basketball coach and athletics administrator

Biographical details
- Born: June 29, 1926; Charleston, West Virginia, U.S.
- Died: December 18, 2016 (aged 90); Gulf Shores, Alabama, U.S.

Playing career
- 1946–1950: Morris Harvey

Coaching career (HC unless noted)
- 1957–1965: Morris Harvey
- 1965–1969: West Virginia (assistant)
- 1969–1974: West Virginia

Administrative career (AD unless noted)
- 1974–1987: Morehead State
- 1987–1982: GSC (commissioner)

Head coaching record
- Overall: 184–154

Garland E. "Sonny" Moran (June 29, 1926 – December 18, 2016) was an American college basketball coach and athletics administrator. He served as the head men's baseball coach at Morris Harvey College—now the University of Charleston—from 1957 to 1965 and West Virginia University from 1969 to 1974.

Moran played college basketball at Morris Harvey, where he was a four-year starter from 1946 to 1950. He returned to MHC as head coach on 1957, where he compiled a 147–76 record. He then moved to West Virginia as an assistant, moving into the head coaching position in 1969 when Bucky Waters moved to Duke University. In five seasons with the Mountaineers, Moran led the team to a 57–68 record. He left to become athletic director at Morehead State University, where he stayed for fourteen seasons. He then was commissioner of the Gulf South Conference until his retirement in 1992.

Moran died in Gulf Shores, Alabama, on December 18, 2016, at age 90.
