= 1969 NCAA University Division basketball tournament =

Edition of USA college basketball tournament

- Season: 1968–69
- Teams: 25
- Finals site: Freedom Hall, Louisville, Kentucky
- Champions: UCLA Bruins (5th title, 5th title game, 6th Final Four)
- Runner-up: Purdue Boilermakers (1st title game, 1st Final Four)
- Semifinalists: Drake Bulldogs (1st Final Four); North Carolina Tar Heels (5th Final Four)
- Winning coach: John Wooden (5th title)
- MOP: Lew Alcindor (UCLA)
- Attendance: 165,712
- Top scorer: Rick Mount (Purdue) (122 points)

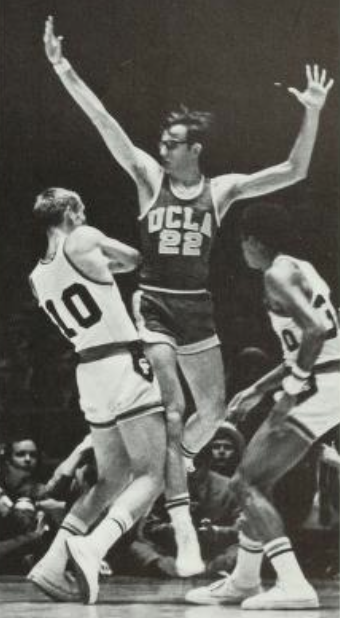
Kenny Heitz of UCLA defending Rick Mount of Purdue in the championship game of the 1969 NCAA Tournament

The 1969 NCAA University Division men's basketball tournament involved 25 schools playing to determine the national champion of men's NCAA Division I college basketball. The 31st annual edition of the tournament began on March 8, 1969, and ended with the championship game on March 22, at Freedom Hall in Louisville, Kentucky. Including consolation games in each of the regions and an overall consolation game, a total of 29 games were played.

UCLA, coached by John Wooden, won the national title with a 92–72 victory in the final game over Purdue, coached by George King. Lew Alcindor of UCLA was named the tournament's Most Outstanding Player.

In the game, Alcindor led the Bruins with 37 points and 20 rebounds, and John Vallely, the "Money Man", added 15 points in UCLA's win over Purdue, Wooden's alma mater. Purdue was hampered due to injuries to starting point guard Billy Keller and forward Herm Gilliam; Purdue had also lost 7'0" center Chuck Bavis to a broken collarbone during the Mideast Regionals against Miami, (OH). In earlier matchups, Bavis had provided an ample challenge to Alcindor. Wooden was an All-American guard for the Boilermakers from 1928 to 1932.

== Schedule and venues ==
The following are the sites that were selected to host each round of the 1969 tournament, and their host(s):

First round

- March 8
  - East Region
    - Keaney Gymnasium, Kingston, Rhode Island (Host: University of Rhode Island)
    - Reynolds Coliseum, Raleigh, North Carolina (Host: North Carolina State University)
  - Mideast Region
    - SIU Arena, Carbondale, Illinois (Host: Southern Illinois University Carbondale)
  - Midwest Region
    - Daniel-Meyer Coliseum, Fort Worth, Texas (Host: Texas Christian University)
  - West Region
    - Pan American Center, Las Cruces, New Mexico (Host: New Mexico State University)

Regional semifinals, 3rd-place games, and finals (Sweet Sixteen and Elite Eight)

- March 13 and 15
  - East Regional, Cole Field House, College Park, Maryland (Host: University of Maryland, College Park)
  - Mideast Regional, Wisconsin Field House, Madison, Wisconsin (Host: University of Wisconsin-Madison)
  - Midwest Regional, Ahearn Field House, Manhattan, Kansas (Host: Kansas State University)
  - West Regional, Pauley Pavilion, Los Angeles, California (Host: UCLA)

National semifinals, 3rd-place game, and championship (Final Four and championship)

- March 20 and 22
  - Freedom Hall, Louisville, Kentucky (Host: University of Louisville)

== Teams ==
Region	Team	Coach	Conference	Finished	Final Opponent	Score
East
East	Davidson	Lefty Driesell	Southern	Regional Runner-up	North Carolina	L 87–85
East	Duquesne	John Manning	Independent	Regional third place	St. John's	W 75–72
East	North Carolina	Dean Smith	Atlantic Coast	Fourth Place	Drake	L 104–84
East	Princeton	Pete Carril	Ivy League	First round	St. John's	L 72–63
East	St. John's	Lou Carnesecca	Independent	Regional Fourth Place	Duquesne	L 75–72
East	Saint Joseph's	Jack McKinney	Middle Atlantic	First round	Duquesne	L 74–52
East	Villanova	Jack Kraft	Independent	First round	Davidson	L 75–61
Mideast
Mideast	Kentucky	Adolph Rupp	Southeastern	Regional third place	Miami (OH)	W 72–71
Mideast	Marquette	Al McGuire	Independent	Regional Runner-up	Purdue	L 75–73
Mideast	Miami (OH)	Tates Locke	Mid-American	Regional Fourth Place	Kentucky	L 72–71
Mideast	Murray State	Cal Luther	Ohio Valley	First round	Marquette	L 82–62
Mideast	Notre Dame	John Dee	Independent	First round	Miami (OH)	L 63–60
Mideast	Purdue	George King	Big Ten	Runner Up	UCLA	L 92–72
Midwest
Midwest	Colorado	Sox Walseth	Big Eight	Regional third place	Texas A&M	W 97–82
Midwest	Colorado State	Jim Williams	Independent	Regional Runner-up	Drake	L 84–77
Midwest	Dayton	Don Donoher	Independent	First round	Colorado State	L 52–50
Midwest	Drake	Maury John	Missouri Valley	Third Place	North Carolina	W 104–84
Midwest	Texas A&M	Shelby Metcalf	Southwest	Regional Fourth Place	Colorado	L 97–82
Midwest	Trinity (TX)	Bob Polk	Southland	First round	Texas A&M	L 81–66
West
West	BYU	Stan Watts	Western Athletic	First round	New Mexico State	L 74–62
West	New Mexico State	Lou Henson	Independent	Regional Fourth Place	Weber State	L 58–56
West	Santa Clara	Dick Garibaldi	West Coast	Regional Runner-up	UCLA	L 90–52
West	Seattle	Morris Buckwalter	Independent	First round	Weber State	L 75–73
West	UCLA	John Wooden	Pac-8	Champion	Purdue	W 92–72
West	Weber State	Phil Johnson	Big Sky	Regional third place	New Mexico State	W 58–56

== Bracket ==
* – Denotes overtime period

=== East region ===
Quarterfinals
Duquesne	74
Saint Joseph's	52
Davidson	75
Villanova	61
St. John's	72
Princeton	63

Semifinals
North Carolina	79
Duquesne	78
Davidson	79
St. John's	69

Finals
North Carolina	87
Davidson	85

=== Mideast region ===
Quarterfinals
Miami (OH)	63
Notre Dame	60
Marquette	82
Murray State	62

Semifinals
Purdue	91
Miami (OH)	71
Kentucky	74
Marquette	81

Finals
Purdue	75
Marquette	73

=== Midwest region ===
Quarterfinals
Texas A&M	81
Trinity (TX)	66
Colorado State	52
Dayton	50

Semifinals
Drake	81
Texas A&M	63
Colorado	56
Colorado State	64

Finals
Drake	84
Colorado State	77

=== West region ===
Quarterfinals
New Mexico State	74
BYU	62
Weber State	75
Seattle	73

Semifinals
UCLA	53
New Mexico State	38
Santa Clara	63
Weber State	59*

Finals
UCLA	90
Santa Clara	52

=== Final Four ===
National semifinals
E	North Carolina	65
ME	Purdue	92
MW	Drake	82
W	UCLA	85

National Final
ME	Purdue	72
W	UCLA	92

=== National third-place game ===
National third-place game
E	North Carolina	84
MW	Drake	104

=== Regional third-place games ===
East Regional third place
Duquesne	75
St. John's	72

Mideast Regional third place
Kentucky	72
Miami (OH)	71

Midwest Regional third place
Colorado	97
Texas A&M	82

West Regional third place
Weber State	58
New Mexico State	56

== See also ==
- 1969 NCAA College Division basketball tournament
- 1969 National Invitation Tournament
- 1969 NAIA basketball tournament
- 1969 National Women's Invitation Tournament

== Notes ==
- Three teams - Drake, Purdue and Trinity University - made their tournament debuts. While Drake and Purdue made the Final Four in their first appearances, Trinity, an independent school from San Antonio, did not win their regional quarterfinal game against Texas A&M. This would be Trinity's only appearance in the tournament, as they would drop down to Division II when the NCAA realigned its divisions in 1973.
- This tournament also marked the last tournament appearance of Seattle University. The team would leave the NCAA in 1980 due to budgetary cuts, joining the NAIA at that time. However, they would rejoin the NCAA in 2001 and, finally, rejoin Division I in 2009. The Redhawks, as they are now known, have not returned to the tournament since.

== Announcers ==
Curt Gowdy, Charlie Jones, Pat Hernon and Jim Simpson - First Round at Raleigh, North Carolina (Davidson-Villanova, St John's-Princeton); Mideast Regional Final at Madison, Wisconsin; Final Four at Louisville, Kentucky; Jones was used at the sideline reporter for the first round, Hernon was used for the Regional Final, and Simpson was used for the Final Four.

- Jim Simpson and Pat Hernon - First Round at Carbondale, Illinois (Miami Ohio-Notre Dame)
- Jim Simpson and Kyle Rote - East Regional Final at College Park, Maryland
- Jay Randolph and Bill Enis - Midwest Regional Final at Manhattan, Kansas
- Charlie Jones and Ross Porter - West Regional Final at Los Angeles, California
