= 1968–69 UCLA Bruins men's basketball team =

American college basketball season

1968–69 UCLA Bruins men's basketball

NCAA tournament National champions NCAA regular season champions Pac-8 champions

National Championship Game, W 92–72 vs. Purdue
- Conference: Pacific-8 Conference

Ranking
- Coaches: No. 1
- AP: No. 1
- Record: 29–1 (13–1 Pac-8)
- Head coach: John Wooden (21st season)
- Assistant coaches: Denny Crum; Gary Cunningham
- MVP: Lew Alcindor
- Home arena: Pauley Pavilion, Los Angeles, California

1968–69 Pacific-8 Conference men's basketball standings
	Conf.				Overall
Team	W		L	PCT	W		L	PCT
No. 1 UCLA	13	–	1	.929	29	–	1	.967
Washington State	11	–	3	.786	18	–	8	.692
USC	8	–	6	.571	15	–	11	.577
Washington	6	–	8	.429	13	–	13	.500
Oregon	5	–	9	.357	13	–	13	.500
Oregon State	5	–	9	.357	12	–	14	.462
California	4	–	10	.286	12	–	13	.480
Stanford	4	–	10	.286	8	–	17	.320
As of April 15, 1969; Rankings from AP Poll

The 1968–69 UCLA Bruins men's basketball team won an unprecedented third consecutive NCAA National Basketball Championship, the fifth in six years under head coach John Wooden with a win over Purdue, coach Wooden's alma mater. The Bruins opened with 25 wins, on a 41-game winning streak, but lost the regular season finale to rival USC on March 8, which snapped a home winning streak of 85 games.

The West Regional was hosted by UCLA in Pauley Pavilion, and they defeated #12 New Mexico State 53–38 and third-ranked Santa Clara 90–52. Center Lew Alcindor had a total of 33 points in the two games.

In the Final Four at Louisville, Kentucky, UCLA had a two-point lead at halftime over #11 Drake and won 85–82 to advance to the championship game against sixth-ranked Purdue. Wooden graduated from Purdue in 1932, after earning All-American honors as a guard on the school's basketball team that he captained during his junior and senior years. The Boilermakers won two Big Ten titles and the 1932 national championship during his years there. Wooden also played baseball during his freshman year.

The "Money Man", John Vallely, scored 29 points and Alcindor had 25 points at the semi-final game. Alcindor scored 37 points with 20 rebounds in the championship game.

== Players ==
1968–69 UCLA Bruins men's basketball team
Players
Coaches

Pos.	#	Name	Height	Weight	Year	Hometown
C	33	Lew Alcindor	7 ft 2 in (2.18 m)	225 lb (102 kg)	Sr	New York, New York
F/C	52	John Ecker	6 ft 6 in (1.98 m)	—	So	Los Angeles, California
	34	George Farmer	—	—
G	22	Kenny Heitz	6 ft 3 in (1.91 m)	—	Sr	Santa Monica, CA
F	34	Jim Nielsen	—	—
C	32	Steve Patterson	6 ft 9 in (2.06 m)	225 lb (102 kg)	So	Riverside, California
F	30	Curtis Rowe	6 ft 7 in (2.01 m)	225 lb (102 kg)	So	Bessemer, Alabama
G	25	Don Saffer	6 ft 1 in (1.85 m)	—
G	42	Terry Schofield	6 ft 3 in (1.91 m)	—	So	Los Angeles, California
F	54	Bill Seibert	—	—
F	53	Lynn Shackelford	6 ft 5 in (1.96 m)	190 lb (86 kg)	Sr	Burbank, CA
G	45	Bill Sweek	6 ft 3 in (1.91 m)	—	Sr	Pasadena, CA
G	40	John Vallely	6 ft 3 in (1.91 m)	185 lb (84 kg)	Jr	Newport, California
	44	Lee Walczuk	—	—
F	35	Sidney Wicks	6 ft 8 in (2.03 m)	225 lb (102 kg)	So	Los Angeles, California

Head coach

John Wooden (Purdue)

Assistant coach(es)

- Denny Crum (UCLA)
- Gary Cunningham (UCLA)

Legend

- (C) Team captain
- (S) Suspended
- (I) Ineligible
- (W) Walk-on
- Injured
- Current redshirt

Roster

== Schedule ==
Date time, TV	Rank^{#}	Opponent^{#}	Result	Record	Site city, state
Regular Season
November 30, 1968	No. 1	No. 10 Purdue	W 94–82	1–0	Pauley Pavilion; Los Angeles, CA
December 6, 1968*	No. 1	at No. 13 Ohio State	W 84–73	2–0	St. John Arena; Columbus, OH
December 7, 1968*	No. 1	at No. 5 Notre Dame	W 88–75	3–0	Athletic & Convocation Center; Notre Dame, IN
December 20, 1968*	No. 1	Minnesota	W 90–51	4–0	Pauley Pavilion; Los Angeles, CA
December 21, 1968*	No. 1	West Virginia	W 95–56	5–0	Pauley Pavilion; Los Angeles, CA
December 27, 1968*	No. 1	vs. Providence; ECAC Holiday Festival	W 98–81	6–0	Madison Square Garden; New York, NY
December 28, 1968*	No. 1	vs. Princeton; ECAC Holiday Festival	W 83–67	7–0	Madison Square Garden; New York, NY
December 30, 1968*	No. 1	at St. John's; ECAC Holiday Festival	W 74–56	8–0	Madison Square Garden; New York, NY
January 4, 1969*	No. 1	Tulane	W 96–64	9–0	Pauley Pavilion; Los Angeles, CA
January 10, 1969	No. 1	at Oregon	W 93–64	10–0 (1-0)	McArthur Court; Eugene, OR
January 11, 1969	No. 1	at Oregon State	W 83–64	11–0 (2-0)	Gill Coliseum; Corvallis, OR
January 18, 1969*	No. 1	Houston	W 100–64	12–0	Pauley Pavilion; Los Angeles, CA
January 24, 1969*	No. 1	vs. Northwestern	W 81–67	13–0	Chicago Stadium; Chicago, IL
January 25, 1969*	No. 1	at Loyola–Chicago	W 84–65	14–0	Chicago Stadium; Chicago, IL
January 31, 1969	No. 1	California	W 109–74	15–0 (3–0)	Pauley Pavilion; Los Angeles, CA
February 1, 1969	No. 1	Stanford	W 98–61	16–0 (4–0)	Pauley Pavilion; Los Angeles, CA
February 7, 1969	No. 1	Washington	W 62–51	17–0 (5–0)	Pauley Pavilion; Los Angeles, CA
February 8, 1969	No. 1	Washington State	W 108–80	18–0 (6–0)	Pauley Pavilion; Los Angeles, CA
February 15, 1969	No. 1	at Washington State	W 83–59	19–0 (7–0)	Bohler Gymnasium; Pullman, WA
February 17, 1969	No. 1	at Washington	W 53–44	20–0 (8–0)	Hec Edmundson Pavilion; Seattle, WA
February 21, 1969	No. 1	Oregon State	W 91–66	21–0 (9–0)	Pauley Pavilion; Los Angeles, CA
February 22, 1969	No. 1	Oregon	W 103–69	22–0 (10–0)	Pauley Pavilion; Los Angeles, CA
February 28, 1969	No. 1	at Stanford	W 81–60	23–0 (11–0)	Maples Pavilion; Stanford, CA
March 1, 1969	No. 1	at California	W 84–77	24–0 (12–0)	Harmon Gym; Berkeley, CA
March 7, 1969	No. 1	at USC	W 61–55 ^{2OT}	25–0 (13–0)	Los Angeles Memorial Sports Arena; Los Angeles, CA
March 8, 1969	No. 1	USC	L 44–46	25–1 (13–1)	Pauley Pavilion; Los Angeles, CA
NCAA Tournament
March 13, 1969*	No. 1	No. 12 New Mexico State; Regional semifinal	W 53–38	26–1	Pauley Pavilion (12,817); Los Angeles, CA
March 15, 1969*; 3:05 pm	No. 1	No. 3 Santa Clara; Regional Final	W 90–52	27–1	Pauley Pavilion (12,812); Los Angeles, CA
March 20, 1969*; 7:30 pm, NBC	No. 1	vs. No. 11 Drake; National semifinal	W 85–82	28–1	Freedom Hall (18,435); Louisville, KY
March 22, 1969*; 1:15 pm, NBC	No. 1	vs. No. 6 Purdue; National Final	W 92–72	29–1	Freedom Hall (18,669); Louisville, KY
*Non-conference game. ^{#}Rankings from AP Poll. (#) Tournament seedings in parentheses. All times are in Pacific time.

== Rankings ==
Ranking movements
	Week														
Poll	Pre	1	2	3	4	5	6	7	8	9	10	11	12	13	Final
AP	1	1	1	1	1	1	1	1	1	1	1	1	1	1	Not released
Coaches	Not released	1	1	1	1	1	1	1	1	1	1	1	1	1	1

== Notes ==
- Three consecutive national championships for the Bruins, five in six years.
- This was the first year in which the Athletic Association of Western Universities officially adopted the name Pacific-8 Conference, although that name had been used unofficially since the 1964–65 season after Oregon and Oregon State joined the conference.
- USC, after losing a 61–55 double-overtime game to UCLA at the Sports Arena the night before, defeated the Bruins, 46–44, at Pauley Pavilion with a slowdown game. The Trojans' win ended four extended winning streaks by the Bruins:
  - 51 games in Pauley Pavilion.
  - 41 overall.
  - 45 in AAWU/Pac-8 play.
  - 17 over USC.
- Last season for the 7-foot-1 and 1/2-inch center Lew Alcindor (later known as Kareem Abdul-Jabbar), who led the Bruins to an overall three-year record (1967–1969) of 88–2, and is the only player in history to be named three-time NCAA Final Four Most Outstanding Player. In 1969, Alcindor earned the first ever Naismith Trophy, given to the nation's top player.
- On the 40th anniversary, the team was honored at halftime of UCLA's Senior Day game, March 7, 2009, at Pauley Pavilion.
- Lew Alcindor's father played trombone with the UCLA band during the championship game.
- This team was honored at the January 26, 2019 game against Arizona on its 50th anniversary.

== Awards and honors ==
- Lew Alcindor, NCAA basketball tournament MOP (1969)
- Lew Alcindor, Naismith College Player of the Year
- Lew Alcindor, Helms Foundation Player of the Year award
- Lew Alcindor, First Team All-American

== Team players drafted into the NBA ==
Round	Pick	Player	NBA Team
1	1	Lew Alcindor	Milwaukee Bucks
1	3	Lucius Allen	Seattle SuperSonics
5	48	Kenny Heitz	Milwaukee Bucks
7	85	Bill Sweek	Phoenix Suns
7	90	Lynn Shackelford	San Diego Rockets
