= 1968–69 Toledo Rockets men's basketball team =

American college basketball season

1968–69 Toledo Rockets men's basketball
- Conference: Mid-American Conference
- Record: 13–11 (5–7 Mid-American)
- Head coach: Bob Nichols
- Home arena: The Field House

The 1968–69 Toledo Rockets men's basketball team represented University of Toledo as a member of the Mid-American Conference during the 1968–69 NCAA University Division men's basketball season.

== Roster ==
1968–69 Toledo Rockets men's basketball team
Players
Coaches

Pos.	#	Name	Height	Weight	Year	Hometown
F	12	Garry Anderson	6 ft 5 in (1.96 m)	190 lb (86 kg)	So	Ida, Michigan
F	40	John Brisker	6 ft 4 in (1.93 m)	212 lb (96 kg)	Sr	Hamtramck, Michigan
F	34	Dale Geistler	6 ft 8 in (2.03 m)	200 lb (91 kg)	So	Detroit, Michigan
F	30	Jim Hayes	6 ft 3 in (1.91 m)	181 lb (82 kg)	Jr	Piqua, Ohio
F	42	Bob Miller	6 ft 4 in (1.93 m)	191 lb (87 kg)	Sr	Gloversville, New York
G	42	Jim Miller	6 ft 2 in (1.88 m)	191 lb (87 kg)	Jr	Xenia, Ohio
F	50	Steve Mix	6 ft 6 in (1.98 m)	222 lb (101 kg)	Sr	Toledo, Ohio
G	10	Mike Murnen	6 ft 3 in (1.91 m)	177 lb (80 kg)	Jr	Toledo, Ohio
F	54	Phil Provo	6 ft 5 in (1.96 m)	215 lb (98 kg)	Jr	Toledo, Ohio
G	24	John Rudley	5 ft 10 in (1.78 m)	152 lb (69 kg)	Sr	Benton Harbor, Michigan
G	22	Larry Smith	6 ft 2 in (1.88 m)	179 lb (81 kg)	Jr	Flint, Michigan
G	14	Steve Shay	6 ft 1 in (1.85 m)	178 lb (81 kg)	So	Toledo, Ohio

Head coach

- Bob Nichols

Assistant coach(es)

- Bob Conroy

Legend

- (C) Team captain
- (S) Suspended
- (I) Ineligible
- (W) Walk-on
- Injured
- Current redshirt

== Schedule ==
Date time, TV	Rank^{#}	Opponent^{#}	Result	Record	Site city, state
November 30*		Akron	W 61–44	1–0	The Field House; Toledo, Ohio
December 6*		Michigan	W 89–76	2–0	The Field House; Toledo, Ohio
December 7*		Michigan State	L 80–81	2–1	The Field House; Toledo, Ohio
December 12*		vs. Western Kentucky	W 88–65	3–1	New York, New York
December 14*		at St. Bonaventure	L 75–85	3–2	Olean, New York
December 21*		Loyola Marymount	W 96–57	4–2	The Field House; Toledo, Ohio
December 28		Marshall	W 98–85	5–2 (1–0)	The Field House; Toledo, Ohio
December 30*		San Francisco State	W 97–58	6–2 (1–0)	The Field House; Toledo, Ohio
January 2*		Morris Harvey	W 66–62	7–2 (1–0)	The Field House; Toledo, Ohio
January 4		Western Michigan	W 67–60	8–2 (2–0)	The Field House; Toledo, Ohio
January 11		at Miami (OH)	L 73–77	8–3 (2–1)	Oxford, Ohio
January 18		Ohio	L 86–92	8–4 (2–2)	The Field House; Toledo, Ohio
January 22		at Bowling Green State	L 63–64	8–5 (2–3)	Bowling Green, Ohio
January 25		at Western Michigan	W 84–64	9–5 (3–3)	Kalamazoo, Michigan
January 29		Kent State	L 69–72	9–6 (3–4)	The Field House; Toledo, Ohio
January 31*		Villanova	L 61–66	9–7 (3–4)	The Field House; Toledo, Ohio
February 1*		Virginia Tech	W 105–76	10–7 (3–4)	The Field House; Toledo, Ohio
February 5		at Ohio	L 95–98	10–8 (3–5)	Athens, Ohio
February 12*		Detroit	L 90–92	10–9 (3–5)	The Field House; Toledo, Ohio
February 15		at Kent State	W 66–58	11–9 (4–5)	Kent, Ohio
February 19		at Marshall	L 83–85	11–10 (4–6)	Huntington, WV
February 22		Bowling Green State	W 88–77	12–10 (5–6)	The Field House; Toledo, Ohio
February 25*		Butler	W 96–68	13–10 (5–6)	The Field House; Toledo, Ohio
March 1		Miami (OH)	L 65–70	13–11 (5–7)	The Field House; Toledo, Ohio
*Non-conference game. ^{#}Rankings from AP Poll. (#) Tournament seedings in parentheses.

== Team players drafted into the NBA ==
Round	Pick	Player	NBA club
5	61	Steve Mix	Detroit Pistons
