= 1968–69 NCAA University Division men's basketball rankings =

- Season: 1968–69
- NCAA Tournament: 1969
- Preseason No. 1: UCLA
- NCAA Tournament Champions: UCLA
NCAA University Division men's basketball rankings


The 1968–69 NCAA University Division men's basketball rankings was made up of two human polls, the AP Poll and the Coaches Poll.

== Legend ==
	Increase in ranking
	Decrease in ranking
	New to rankings from previous week
Italics	Number of first place votes
(#–#)	Win–loss record
т	Tied with team above or below also with this symbol

== AP Poll ==
This was the first season since 1959–60 that AP polls throughout the season included 20 ranked teams.

	Preseason	Week 2 Dec. 2	Week 3 Dec. 9	Week 4 Dec. 16	Week 5 Dec. 23	Week 6 Dec. 30	Week 7 Jan. 6	Week 8 Jan. 13	Week 9 Jan. 20	Week 10 Jan. 27	Week 11 Feb. 3	Week 12 Feb. 10	Week 13 Feb. 17	Week 14 Feb. 24	Final Mar. 3	
1.	UCLA	UCLA (1–0)	UCLA (3–0)	UCLA (3–0)	UCLA (5–0)	UCLA (7–0)	UCLA (9–0)	UCLA (11–0)	UCLA (12–0)	UCLA (14–0)	UCLA (16–0)	UCLA (18–0)	UCLA (19–0)	UCLA (22–0)	UCLA (24–0)	1.
2.	North Carolina	North Carolina (0–0)	North Carolina (3–0)	North Carolina (4–0)	North Carolina (6–0)	Davidson (7–0)	North Carolina (8–1)	North Carolina (11–1)	North Carolina (13–1)	North Carolina (13–1)	North Carolina (14–1)	North Carolina (17–1)	Santa Clara (21–0)	North Carolina (21–2)	La Salle (23–1)	2.
3.	Kentucky	Kentucky (1–0)	Davidson (3–0)	Davidson (3–0)	Davidson (5–0)	Kentucky (6–1)	Santa Clara (12–0)	Santa Clara (14–0)	Santa Clara (16–0)	Santa Clara (16–0)	Santa Clara (17–0)	Santa Clara (20–0)	North Carolina (19–2)	La Salle (22–1)	Santa Clara (24–1)	3.
4.	Notre Dame	Kansas (1–0)	Kentucky (2–1)	Kentucky (3–1)	Kentucky (5–1)	North Carolina (7–1)	Illinois (10–0)	Davidson (10–1)	Davidson (12–1)	Davidson (14–1)	Kentucky (14–2)	Kentucky (16–2)	La Salle (20–1)	Santa Clara (22–1)	North Carolina (22–3)	4.
5.	Kansas	Notre Dame (0–0)	New Mexico (3–0)	New Mexico (5–0)	Villanova (5–0)	Kansas (10–1)	Kansas (12–1)	Kentucky (9–2)	Kentucky (11–2)	Kentucky (12–2)	St. John's (13–2)	La Salle (18–1)	Davidson (20–2)	Davidson (22–2)	Davidson (24–2)	5.
6.	Davidson	Houston (1–0)	Cincinnati (3–0)	Cincinnati (4–0)	New Mexico (8–1)	Santa Clara (9–0)	Davidson (8–1)	St. John's (9–2)	St. John's (11–2)	St. John's (12–2)	Davidson (15–2)	Davidson (18–2)	Kentucky (17–3)	Kentucky (19–3)	Purdue (18–4)	6.
7.	St. Bonaventure	Davidson (1–0)	Notre Dame (1–1)	Notre Dame (3–1)	Notre Dame (5–1)	Detroit (10–0)	Kentucky (7–2)	New Mexico State (14–0)	New Mexico State (15–0)	Illinois (12–1)	La Salle (16–1)	Tulsa (18–2)	St. John's (18–3)	St. John's (20–3)	Kentucky (20–4)	7.
8.	Houston	New Mexico (1–0)	Villanova (3–0)	Villanova (4–0)	Kansas (8–1)	Illinois (9–0)	St. John's (8–2)	Illinois (11–1)	Illinois (11–1)	New Mexico State (16–0)	Villanova (15–2)	Purdue (13–3)	Duquesne (16–2)	South Carolina (19–3)	St. John's (22–4)	8.
9.	New Mexico	Cincinnati (1–0)	Duke (3–0)	St. Bonaventure (4–0)	Santa Clara (6–0)	Villanova (6–1)	Villanova (8–1)	Villanova (10–1)	La Salle (12–1)	La Salle (14–1)	Purdue (11–3)	St. John's (16–3)	Purdue (14–4)	Purdue (16–4)	Duquesne (17–3)	9.
10.	Purdue	Villanova (1–0)	St. Bonaventure (2–0)	Santa Clara (5–0)	Cincinnati (6–1)	Cincinnati (7–1)	New Mexico State (11–0)	Kansas (13–2)	Duquesne (11–1)	Villanova (13–2)	Illinois (13–2)	Illinois (14–2)	Ohio State (14–4)	Duquesne (17–3)	Villanova (17–3)	10.
11.	Villanova	St. Bonaventure (0–0)	Kansas (3–1)	Kansas (5–1)	Detroit (8–0)	La Salle (8–0)	La Salle (9–1)	La Salle (11–1)	Villanova (11–2)	Duquesne (11–1)	Tulsa (16–2)	Villanova (16–3)	Villanova (17–4)	Louisville (17–3)	Drake (21–4)	11.
12.	Ohio State	Vanderbilt (0–0)	Houston (3–1)	Purdue (4–1)	Illinois (7–0)	New Mexico State (9–0)	Northwestern (9–1)	Duquesne (10–1)	Ohio State (9–2)	Ohio State (11–2)	Ohio State (12–3)	Kansas (17–3)	South Carolina (17–3)	Villanova (19–4)	New Mexico State (23–3)	12.
13.	Vanderbilt	Ohio State (1–0)	Purdue (2–1)	Detroit (6–0)	St. Bonaventure (5–1)	Ohio State (6–1)	Detroit (10–2)	Ohio State (8–2)	Kansas (14–3)	Tulsa (14–2)	Kansas (15–3)	Duquesne (14–2)	Louisville (16–3)	Kansas (19–4)	South Carolina (19–5)	13.
14.	Cincinnati	Purdue (0–1)	Detroit (4–0)	New Mexico State (5–0)	Louisville (7–0)	Louisville (7–0)	Louisville (9–1)	Tulsa (11–2)	Tulsa (13–2)	Purdue (10–3)	Columbia (15–1)	Colorado (16–3)	Tulsa (18–4)	Ohio State (15–5)	Marquette (21–4)	14.
15.	Marquette	Detroit (1–0)	Western Kentucky (4–0)	California (3–0)	New Mexico State (7–0)	Duquesne (9–0)	Duquesne (9–1)	Marquette (11–2)	Notre Dame (12–2)	Kansas (14–3)	Duquesne (12–2)	New Mexico State (19–2)	New Mexico State (21–2)	Illinois (16–4)	Louisville (18–4)	15.
16.	Western Kentucky	Duke (1–0)	Santa Clara (3–0)	La Salle (4–0)	Ohio State (4–1)	Notre Dame (5–2)	Ohio State (7–2)	Notre Dame (10–2)	Marquette (12–2)	Marquette (13–2)	New Mexico State (16–2)	Ohio State (12–4)	Kansas (18–4)	New Mexico State (21–3)	Boston College (20–3)	16.
17.	Duke	Western Kentucky (1–0)	Ohio State (1–1)	Ohio State (2–1)	La Salle (6–0)	St. John's (8–1)	Notre Dame (7–2)	Northwestern (9–2)	Colorado (14–2)	Colorado (14–2)	Marquette (14–3)	Dayton (16–4)	Tennessee (15–3)	Tennessee (16–4)	Notre Dame (20–5)	17.
18.	Detroit	Santa Clara (1–0)	California (2–0)	Western Kentucky (6–1)	Purdue (5–2)	New Mexico (8–2)	Drake (10–1)	Baylor (9–2)	Purdue (9–3)	Columbia (13–1)	New Mexico (13–6)	Marquette (16–3)	Colorado (17–4)	Marquette (19–4)	Colorado (19–6)	18.
19.	Florida	California (0–0)	Iowa (3–0)	Louisville (5–0)	Wyoming (7–0)	Northwestern (8–1)	Cincinnati (7–3)	Cincinnati (9–3)	Columbia (13–1)	South Carolina (10–2)	Dayton (15–3)	Baylor (14–3)	Illinois (14–4)	Tulsa (18–5)	Kansas (20–5)	19.
20.	Tennessee	Iowa (1–0); Marquette (0–0); Tennessee (1–0)	La Salle (1–0)	Houston (4–2)	Tennessee (5–1)	St. Bonaventure (6–2)	Marquette (8–2)	Colorado (13–2)	Dayton (12–2)	Dayton (13–3)	Colorado (14–3)	Louisville (14–3)	Marquette (17–4)	Boston College (19–3)	Illinois (17–5)	20.
	Preseason	Week 2 Dec. 2	Week 3 Dec. 9	Week 4 Dec. 16	Week 5 Dec. 23	Week 6 Dec. 30	Week 7 Jan. 6	Week 8 Jan. 13	Week 9 Jan. 20	Week 10 Jan. 27	Week 11 Feb. 3	Week 12 Feb. 10	Week 13 Feb. 17	Week 14 Feb. 24	Final Mar. 3	
		Dropped: Florida	Dropped: Vanderbilt; Marquette; Tennessee	Dropped: Duke; Iowa (3–2)	Dropped: California; Western Kentucky; Houston	Dropped: Purdue (7–3); Wyoming (8–1); Tennessee	Dropped: New Mexico; St. Bonaventure	Dropped: Detroit; Louisville; Drake (11–2)	Dropped: Northwestern; Baylor; Cincinnati	Dropped: Notre Dame	Dropped: South Carolina	Dropped: Columbia; New Mexico	Dropped: Dayton; Baylor	Dropped: Colorado	Dropped: Ohio State; Tennessee; Tulsa (18–6)	

== UPI Poll ==
	Preseason Dec. 3	Week 2 Dec. 10	Week 3 Dec. 17	Week 4 Dec. 24	Week 5 Dec. 31	Week 6 Jan. 7	Week 7 Jan. 14	Week 8 Jan. 21	Week 9 Jan. 28	Week 10 Feb. 4	Week 11 Feb. 11	Week 12 Feb. 18	Week 13 Feb. 25	Week 14 Mar. 4	Final Mar. 11	
1.	UCLA (1–0)	UCLA (3–0)	UCLA (3–0)	UCLA (5–0)	UCLA (7–0)	UCLA (9–0)	UCLA (11–0)	UCLA (12–0)	UCLA (14–0)	UCLA (16–0)	UCLA (18–0)	UCLA (19–0)	UCLA (22–0)	UCLA (24–0)	UCLA (25–1)	1.
2.	North Carolina (0–0)	North Carolina (3–0)	North Carolina (4–0)	North Carolina (6–0)	North Carolina (7–1)	North Carolina (8–1)	North Carolina (11–1)	North Carolina (13–1)	North Carolina (13–1)	North Carolina (14–1)	North Carolina (17–1)	Santa Clara (21–0)	North Carolina (21–2)	Santa Clara (24–1)	North Carolina (25–3)	2.
3.	Kentucky (1–0)	Davidson (3–0)	Davidson (3–0)	Davidson (5–0)	Davidson (7–0)	Santa Clara (12–0)	Santa Clara (14–0)	Santa Clara (16–0)	Santa Clara (16–0)	Santa Clara (17–0)	Santa Clara (20–0)	North Carolina (19–2)	Santa Clara (22–1)	North Carolina (22–3)	Davidson (26–2)	3.
4.	Notre Dame (0–0)	Kentucky (2–1)	Cincinnati (4–0)	Kentucky (5–1)	Kentucky (6–1)	Davidson (8–1)	Davidson (10–1)	Davidson (12–1)	Davidson (14–1)	Kentucky (14–2)	Kentucky (16–2)	Davidson (20–2)	La Salle (22–1)	Davidson (24–2)	Santa Clara (26–1)	4.
5.	Kansas (1–0)	New Mexico (3–0)	Kentucky (3–1)	Villanova (5–0)	Santa Clara (9–0)	Illinois (10–0)	Illinois (11–1)	Kentucky (11–2)	Kentucky (12–2)	St. John's (13–2)	Davidson (18–2)	La Salle (20–1)	Davidson (22–2)	La Salle (23–1)	Kentucky (22–4)	5.
6.	Houston (1–0)	Villanova (3–0)	New Mexico (5–0)	Santa Clara (6–0)	Kansas (10–1)	Kansas (12–1)	Kentucky (9–2)	New Mexico State (15–0)	New Mexico State (16–0)	Davidson (15–2)	St. John's (16–3)	Kentucky (17–3)	Kentucky (19–3)	Purdue (18–4)	La Salle (23–1)	6.
7.	Davidson (1–0)	Notre Dame (1–1)	Villanova (4–0)	Notre Dame (5–1)	Villanova (6–1)	Kentucky (7–2)	New Mexico State (14–0)	St. John's (11–2)	St. John's (12–2)	Villanova (15–2)	La Salle (18–1)	St. John's (18–3)	Purdue (16–4)	Kentucky (20–4)	Purdue (20–4)	7.
8.	New Mexico (1–0)	Cincinnati (3–0)	Notre Dame (3–1)	New Mexico (8–1)	Illinois (9–0)	St. John's (8–2)	St. John's (9–2)	Illinois (11–1)	Illinois (12–1)	Illinois (13–2)	Purdue (13–3)	Purdue (14–4)	St. John's (20–3)	St. John's (22–4)	St. John's (23–5)	8.
9.	Villanova (1–0)	Purdue (2–1)	Kansas (5–1)	Kansas (8–1)	Cincinnati (7–1)	Villanova (8–1)	Kansas (13–2)	Villanova (11–2)	Villanova (13–2)	La Salle (16–1)	Illinois (14–2)	Villanova (17–4)	Villanova (19–4)	Duquesne (19–3)	New Mexico State (24–3)	9.
10.	Cincinnati (1–0)	Kansas (3–1)	Santa Clara (5–0)	Cincinnati (6–1)	St. John's (8–1)	New Mexico State (11–0)	Villanova (10–1)	Tulsa (13–2)	La Salle (14–1)	Kansas (15–3)	Villanova (16–3)	Duquesne (16–2)	Duquesne (17–3)	Villanova (21–4)	Duquesne (17–3)	10.
11.	Purdue (0–1)	St. Bonaventure (2–0)	St. Bonaventure (4–0)	Illinois (7–0)	Duquesne (9–0)	New Mexico (10–3)	Tulsa (11–2)	Kansas (14–3)	Duquesne (11–1)	Tulsa (16–2)	Tulsa (18–2)	South Carolina (17–3)	Louisville (17–3)	Drake (21–4)	Drake (22–4)	11.
12.	St. Bonaventure (0–0)	Duke (3–0)	Purdue (4–1)	New Mexico State (7–0)	New Mexico (8–2)	Notre Dame (7–2)	New Mexico (11–4)	Colorado (14–2)	Tulsa (14–2)	Purdue (11–3)	Kansas (17–3)	Tulsa (18–4)	South Carolina (19–3)	New Mexico State (23–3) т	Colorado (20–6)	12.
13.	New Mexico State (1–0)	Houston (3–1)	New Mexico State (5–0)	St. Bonaventure (5–1)	Detroit (10–0)	Purdue (8–3)	Notre Dame (10–2)	Duquesne (11–1) т	Kansas (14–3)	New Mexico State (16–2)	Colorado (16–3)	New Mexico State (21–2)	New Mexico State (21–3)	Wyoming (19–7) т	Louisville (20–4)	13.
14.	Ohio State (1–0)	Western Kentucky (4–0)	La Salle (4–0)	Wyoming (7–0)	Columbia (8–0)	Duquesne (9–1)	Duquesne (10–1)	Notre Dame (12–2) т	Colorado (14–2)	Columbia (15–1)	New Mexico (13–7)	Louisville (16–3)	Kansas (19–4)	Notre Dame (20–5) т	Marquette (23–4)	14.
15.	Duke (1–0) т	Santa Clara (3–0)	Houston (4–2)	Detroit (8–0)	New Mexico State (9–0)	Columbia (9–1)	Wyoming (9–2)	Ohio State (9–2)	Columbia (13–1)	New Mexico (13–6)	Duquesne (14–2)	Ohio State (14–4)	Ohio State (15–5)	Colorado (19–6) т	Boston College (21–3) т	15.
16.	Western Kentucky (1–0) т	New Mexico State (3–0)	Illinois (4–0)	Louisville (7–0)	La Salle (8–0)	Louisville (9–1)	Purdue (9–3)	La Salle (12–1)	Notre Dame (13–3)	Duquesne (12–2)	Louisville (14–3) т	Illinois (14–4)	Wyoming (16–8)	South Carolina (19–5)	Villanova (21–5) т	16.
17.	Santa Clara (1–0)	Detroit (3–0)	Columbia (4–0)	Dayton (6–1)	Purdue (7–3)	Drake (10–1)	Colorado (13–2) т	Columbia (13–1)	Ohio State (11–2)	Iowa (10–4)	Wyoming (14–5) т	New Mexico (15–7) т	Drake (19–4)	Marquette (21–4)	Weber State (26–2) т	17.
18.	USC (0–2)	Ohio State (1–1) т	Tulsa (5–1)	Ohio State (4–1)	Louisville (7–0) т	Tulsa (10–2)	St. Bonaventure (7–5) т	St. Bonaventure (7–5)	Dayton (13–3) т	Ohio State (12–3) т	Columbia (15–3) т	Wyoming (15–5) т	Boston College (19–3) т	Kansas (20–5)	Wyoming (19–8) т	18.
19.	Florida (0–0)	Dayton (4–0) т	Western Kentucky (6–1)	Purdue (5–2)	Vanderbilt (6–2) т	Northwestern (9–1) т	Cincinnati (9–3) т	Dayton (12–2) т	New Mexico (11–6) т	Lamar (15–0) т	South Carolina (14–3) т	Kansas (18–4) т	New Mexico (16–8) т	Boston College (20–3)	Colorado State (17–6)	19.
20.	California (0–0)	USC (2–2)	USC (4–2)	USC (5–3)	Wyoming (8–1) т	Detroit (10–2) т	Columbia (11–1) т Louisville (10–2) т	New Mexico (11–6) т	Purdue (10–3) т Wyoming (10–3) т	Colorado (14–3)	Notre Dame (15–4) т Boston College (15–3) т	Columbia (17–3) т	Illinois (16–4)	Princeton (19–6)	Kansas (20–6) т South Carolina (21–6) т	20.
	Preseason Dec. 3	Week 2 Dec. 10	Week 3 Dec. 17	Week 4 Dec. 24	Week 5 Dec. 31	Week 6 Jan. 7	Week 7 Jan. 14	Week 8 Jan. 21	Week 9 Jan. 28	Week 10 Feb. 4	Week 11 Feb. 11	Week 12 Feb. 18	Week 13 Feb. 25	Week 14 Mar. 4	Final Mar. 11	
		Dropped: California (2–0); Florida (0–0)	Dropped: Duke; Detroit (6–0); Ohio State (2–1); Dayton	Dropped: La Salle (6–0); Houston; Columbia; Tulsa; Western Kentucky	Dropped: Notre Dame (5–2); St. Bonaventure (6–2); Dayton; Ohio State (6–1); USC	Dropped: Cincinnati (7–3); La Salle (9–1); Wyoming; Vanderbilt	Dropped: Drake; Northwestern (9–2); Detroit	Dropped: Wyoming; Purdue (9–3); Cincinnati; Louisville	Dropped: St. Bonaventure	Dropped: Notre Dame; Dayton (15–3); Wyoming	Dropped: New Mexico State; Iowa; Ohio State; Lamar	Dropped: Colorado; Notre Dame; Boston College	Dropped: Tulsa; Columbia	Dropped: Louisville; Ohio State; New Mexico; Illinois	Dropped: Notre Dame (20–6); Princeton (19–7)	
