= Deaths in August 1987 =

The following is a list of notable deaths in August 1987.

Entries for each day are listed alphabetically by surname. A typical entry lists information in the following sequence:

- Name, age, country of citizenship at birth, subsequent country of citizenship (if applicable), reason for notability, cause of death (if known), and reference.

== August 1987 ==
=== 1 ===
- Amilcare Canevari, 82, Italian Olympic rower (1928).
- Caroline Russell Compton, 80, American artist.
- Benson Fong, 70, American actor, stroke.
- Howdy Forrester, 65, American bluegrass fiddler.
- S. Marshall Kempner, 88, American investment banker, founder of the French Bank of California, heart failure.
- Juho Matsalu, 75, Estonian footballer.
- Harold Morphy, 85, British Olympic rower (1924).
- Pola Negri, 90, Polish-American actress and singer, pneumonia and brain tumour.

=== 2 ===
- Mohammad Choucair, 70, Lebanese politician, assassinated.
- Abu Sayeed Chowdhury, 66, President of Bangladesh, chairman of U.N. Commission on Human Rights, heart attack.
- Tom Doerr, 39–40, American gay activist.
- Jaime Ferrer, 70, Filipino lawyer, guerrilla and politician, Secretary of Local Government, assassinated.
- Clement Howell, 51, Turks and Caicos politician, presumed airplane crash.
- David N. Johnson, 65, American organist and composer.
- David A. Martin, 50, American founding member and bass player for Sam the Sham, heart attack.
- Mangkunegara VIII, 62, Indonesian politician, last ruler of Mangkunegaran, Java.
- Aileen Meagher, 76, Canadian Olympic athlete (1936).
- Adolf Schön, 81, German racing cyclist.
- Myron Stout, 78–79, American abstract painter, lung cancer.
- Yves Volel, 52–53, Haitian lawyer, activist and presidential candidate, assassinated.

=== 3 ===
- Garrick Agnew, 56, Australian swimmer, businessman and dual Olympian (1948, 1952), heart attack.
- Edward Cowart, 62, American circuit judge, heart attack.
- Joseph Desch, 80, American electrical engineer and inventor.
- Jean Douvinet, 88, French Olympic wrestler (1920).
- Dorothy Hammerstein, 88, Australian-born American interior designer and decorator, wife of Oscar Hammerstein II.
- William S. Moorhead, 64, American politician, member of U.S. House of Representatives (1959–1981), lung cancer.
- Ivan Mykolaichuk, 46, Ukrainian actor and screenwriter (Shadows of Forgotten Ancestors).
- Ivan Svanidze, 59, German-born Soviet academic specialising in agriculture and African Studies.
- Jim Veitch, 82, Australian rules footballer.

=== 4 ===
- Hans Aderhold, 68, German Olympic diver (1952).
- Sheikh Ali, 62, Malaysian Olympic field hockey player (1956).
- Dick Farney, 65, Brazilian jazz pianist, composer and singer.
- József Fekete, 64, Hungarian Olympic gymnast (1948, 1952).
- Kenny Price, 56, American country music singer, songwriter and actor, heart attack.
- Jesse M. Unruh, 64, American politician, minority leader and speaker of the California State Assembly, prostate cancer.
- Allan White, 72, Australian rules footballer.
- John W. Wydler, 63, American politician, member of U.S. House of Representatives (1963–1981), heart attack.

=== 5 ===
- Jocko Conlon, 89, American MLB player (Boston Braves).
- Johannes Haasnoot, 90, Dutch Olympic rower (1920).
- Anatoli Papanov, 64, Soviet actor, heart attack.
- Norm Raines, 66, Australian rules footballer.
- Salvador Flores Rivera, 67, Mexican composer and singer.
- Tatsuhiko Shibusawa, 59, Japanese novelist and translator of French literature, carotid aneurysm.

=== 6 ===
- Abbas Babaei, 36, Iranian pilot, brigadier-general in Islamic Republic of Iran Air Force, shot down.
- Sherwood Bailey, 64, American child actor, cancer.
- Paula Bauersmith, 78, American actress, cancer.
- Omer Braeckeveldt, 69, Belgian road cyclist.
- Ira C. Eaker, 91, U.S. Army Air Forces general during World War II.
- Georges Krotoff, 81, French Olympic sprinter (1928).
- Lena Küchler-Silberman, 77, Polish member of the Jewish resistance.
- Myles Lane, 83, American NHL ice hockey player (New York Rangers) and Supreme Court justice, Alzheimer's disease.
- Léon Noël, 99, French diplomat and politician, ambassador to Poland.

=== 7 ===
- Mihailo Apostolski, 80, Macedonian general and politician.
- Jeanne Boitel, 83, French film actress, member of French Resistance.
- Reed Budge, 66, American politician, member of the Idaho Senate (1967–1986).
- Camille Chamoun, 87, Lebanese politician, President of Lebanon, heart attack.
- Andrew D. Holt, 82, American educator, president of the University of Tennessee.
- Nobusuke Kishi, 90, Japanese politician, Prime Minister of Japan, heart complications.
- Vibeke Møller, 82, Danish Olympic swimmer (1924).
- Jaap van Praag, 77, Dutch football administrator, chairman AFC Ajax, traffic accident.

=== 8 ===
- Danilo Blanuša, 83, Yugoslavian mathematician, physicist and engineer.
- Harry Cockerill, 88, Australian politician, member of the New South Wales Legislative Council (1959–1973).
- Julián Gorkin, 86, Spanish revolutionary socialist, leader of the Workers' Party of Marxist Unification.
- Laurence Hyde, 73, English-born Canadian film maker, painter and graphic artist.
- Nirmal Mahto, 36, Indian political activist, leader of Jharkhand Mukti Morcha, murdered.
- Trevor O'Keeffe, 18–19, Irish man murdered while hitchhiking in France.
- Irwin Schiff, 50, American businessman and mob associate, murdered.
- Juan Antonio Yanes, 85, Venezuelan professional baseball pioneer

=== 9 ===
- Rudolf Broby-Johansen, 86, Danish art historian, communist activist and writer.
- Col Colborne, 77, Australian politician, member of the New South Wales Legislative Council (1949–1973).
- Leon Keyserling, 79, American economist and lawyer, chairman of the Council of Economic Advisers.
- August Miete, 78, Nazi German SS member and mass murderer, sentenced to life imprisonment.
- Henry Morgan, 80, Irish first-class cricketer.

=== 10 ===
- Georgios Athanasiadis-Novas, 94, Greek politician, Prime Minister of Greece, heart failure.
- Casey Donovan, (John Culver), 43, American pornographic actor, AIDS.
- Kerstin Gellerman, 61, Swedish politician, member of parliament.
- Edmund Germer, 85, German inventor, father of the fluorescent lamp.
- Uys Krige, 77, South African writer of novels, poems and plays.
- Patrick O'Boyle, 91, American Roman Catholic prelate, Archbishop of Washington.
- Prince Yamashina Takehiko, 89, Japanese head of the Yamashina-no-miya.
- Raquel Torres, 78, Mexican-born American film actress, heart attack.

=== 11 ===
- Eugene Bordinat, 67, American automobile designer and corporate executive (Ford Motor Company).
- Živko Čingo, 51, Yugoslavian writer.
- F. Herrick Herrick, 85, American film director.
- Walter Herrmann, 76, German nuclear physicist and mechanical engineer.
- John McGillen, 70, American MLB player (Philadelphia Athletics).
- Karlo Pavlenč, 61, Yugoslavian Olympic rower (1948, 1952).
- Clara Peller, 85, Russian-born American manicurist and television personality, heart failure.
- Alexander Ziegler, 43, Swiss author and actor, suicide.

=== 12 ===
- Alison Marjorie Ashby, 86, Australian botanical artist and plant collector.
- Crystal Bennett, 68, British archaeologist, founded the British Institute in Amman, liver disease.
- Lester Gaba, 80, American sculptor and writer, colon cancer.
- Kaj Hansen, 70, Danish footballer and manager.
- Dmitri Klebanov, 69, Ukrainian composer.
- Niels Knudsen, 82, Danish architect.
- Sally Long, 85, American dancer and actress.
- Max Rowley, 64, Australian racing cyclist.
- Fatime Sokoli, 39, Albanian folk music singer.

=== 13 ===
- Guðmundur Ingólfsson, 58, Icelandic Olympic swimmer (1948).
- Walter Kondratovich, 63, American football player and coach.
- Thomas B. Manuel, 88, American community leader and politician, heart attack.
- Ethel McMillan, 83, New Zealand politician, member of the New Zealand Parliament (1953–1975).

=== 14 ===
- Sydney Bromley, 78, English actor, cancer.
- Giovanni Delago, 84, Italian Olympic cross-country skier (1932).
- Bernard Fagg, 71, British archaeologist and museum curator.
- Mary-Louise Hooper, 80, American heiress and activist in the civil rights and anti-apartheid movements.
- Narayana Kasturi, 89, Indian writer, professor and journalist.
- Nora Listach, 77, American baseball player.
- Brewster Mason, 64, English actor, injuries from a fall.
- Albert Mayaud, 88, French Olympic water polo player (1920, 1924).
- Vincent Persichetti, 72, American composer and pianist.
- Edgar Rosenberg, 61, German-born British film and television producer, suicide.
- Shigeo Sasaki, 74, Japanese mathematician (Sasakian manifolds).
- Wylie Sypher, 81, American non-fiction writer.

=== 15 ===
- Konstantin Aleksandrov, 67, Soviet sailor and Olympian (1952, 1956, 1964, 1968).
- Hanna Greally, 63, Irish writer, incarcerated against her will in psychiatric hospital for 18 years.
- Bernard Michaux, 65, Luxembourgian Olympic footballer (1948).
- Ubaldo Ragona, 70, Italian film director and screenwriter.
- Dan Sandifer, 60, American NFL player (Washington Redskins), heart disease.
- Robert Leonard Ewing Scott, 90, American convicted murderer.
- Louis Scutenaire, 82, Belgian French-language poet and anarchist.
- K. K. Shetty, 86, Indian politician, Member of Parliament.

=== 16 ===
- Pepe Cáceres, 52, Colombian bullfighter, complications from a goring.
- Dorothy Hughes, 77, English-born Kenyan architect and politician.
- Sumiko Kurishima, 85, Japanese actress, master of traditional Japanese dance.
- Samuel Lubell, 75, American public opinion pollster and author, stroke.
- Edwin Barnard Martin, 68, Canadian member of the British Free Corps in Nazi Germany.
- Andrei Mironov, 46, Soviet actor, complications from mis-administered drug.
- Peter Schidlof, 65, Austrian-born British violist, co-founder of the Amadeus Quartet.
- Nick Vanos, 24, American NBA basketballer (Phoenix Suns), plane crash.
- Charles H. Wesley, 95, American historian, minister and author.

=== 17 ===
- Leon Berkowitz, 75, American artist, cancer.
- Frank Beswick, 75, British politician, deputy leader of the House of Lords.
- Clarence Brown, 97, American film director (Anna Karenina, National Velvet), kidney failure.
- Gary Chester, 62, American studio drummer and author.
- Carlos Drummond de Andrade, 84, Brazilian poet and writer, heart attack.
- Rudolf Hess, 93, German Nazi official, Deputy Führer, ostensibly suicide by hanging.
- Mac Kac, 67, French jazz drummer.
- Harold McCluskey, 75, American chemical operations technician and radiation survivor, coronary artery disease.
- Shaike Ophir, 58, Israeli actor, playwright and director (The Policeman), lung cancer.
- Antti Rantamaa, 82, Finnish priest, member of Finnish Parliament.
- Tjilik Riwut, 69, Indonesian Air Force officer, governor of Central Kalimantan, hepatitis.
- Heinz Schubert, 73, Nazi German SS officer and war criminal.
- Tillit Sidney Teddlie, 102, American singing teacher, composer and minister.

=== 18 ===
- Keerthisena Abeywickrama, 53, Sri Lankan politician, member of parliament, grenade attack.
- Shichirō Fukazawa, 73, Japanese author.
- Ralph Haver, 71–72, American architect (Haver Homes), pulmonary disease.
- Dambudzo Marechera, 35, Zimbabwean novelist, playwright and poet, pulmonary disorder.

=== 19 ===
- Bahri Kavaja, 62, Albanian football player.
- Fergus Bowes-Lyon, 58, British nobleman and peer, heart attack.
- Laxmi Narayan Mishra, 83, Indian Hindi play writer.
- Margot Moles, 76, Spanish Olympic alpine skier (1936).
- Sachin Nag, 67, Indian swimmer and water polo player, Olympian.
- Hayden Rorke, 76, American actor (I Dream of Jeannie), multiple myeloma.
- Paul Schlack, 89, German chemist.
- Harold Sherman, 89, American writer and "parapsychologist".
- Yidnekatchew Tessema, 65, Ethiopian international footballer (Saint George, Ethiopia).

=== 20 ===
- René Andrei, 81, French sculptor.
- Winifred Bryson, 94, American stage and silent-screen actress (A Heart to Let).
- José Bueno y Monreal, 82, Spanish cardinal, Roman Catholic archbishop of Seville.
- Walenty Kłyszejko, 77, Estonian-Polish Olympic basketball player (1936).

=== 21 ===
- Frances Mary Albrier, 88, American civil rights activist.
- Bombolo, (Franco Lechner), 56, Italian actor and comedian, complications from surgery.
- Simone Boutarel, 95, French sculptor.
- Dorothy Adlington Cadbury, 94, English botanist and director of confectionery company Cadbury.
- Steve Davis, 58, American jazz bassist (John Coltrane Quartet).
- Connor Hansen, 73, American lawyer and jurist, justice of the Wisconsin Supreme Court (1967–1980).
- Li Fang-Kuei, 85, Chinese linguist.
- Angelo Francesco Lavagnino, 78, Italian composer of film scores.
- Glesca Marshall, 80, American actress.
- Marion McCarthy, 80, Canadian Olympic speed skater (1932).
- Irving Thalberg Jr., 56, American author, son of Norma Shearer, cancer.

=== 22 ===
- Carlos Atlagic, 71, Chilean footballer.
- Arne Brustad, 75, Norwegian international footballer (Lyn Fotball, Norway) and Olympic medalist.
- Leonard Caston, 70, American blues pianist and guitarist, heart disease.
- Mary Dobkin, 84, Russian-born American amateur sports coach, stroke.
- Maurice Harper, 73, American football player (Philadelphia Eagles. Pittsburgh Steelers).
- Joseph P. Lash, 77, American political activist, journalist and writer (Pulitzer Prize winner), heart ailment.
- George Mayo, 93, American baseball player.
- Ted Sherdeman, 78, American radio producer and screenwriter (My Favorite Martian, The Flying Nun, Bewitched).
- John Milton Bryan Simpson, 84, American circuit judge.

=== 23 ===
- Griselda Allan, 81, English artist.
- Siegfried Borris, 80, German composer.
- Thomas D'Alesandro Jr., 84, American politician, member of U.S. House of Representatives (1939–1947), cardiac arrest.
- Sheila van Damm, 65, British motor rally driver, owner of Windmill Theatre in London.
- Malcolm Kirk, 51, English professional wrestler and rugby league player (Featherstone Rovers), died in the ring.
- Paulo Navalho, 20, Angolan-born Portuguese footballer, heart attack during a game.
- Didier Pironi, 35, French racing driver and power boat racer, powerboat racing accident.
- Stéphanos I Sidarouss, 83, Egyptian priest of the Coptic Catholic Church.

=== 24 ===
- Michèle Alfa, 76, French actress, hider of French Resistance leaders.
- Douglas Byng, 94, English comic singer and songwriter.
- Carlos Cossio, 84, Argentinian university reformer, lawyer and professor.
- Hans Fritsch, 76, German Olympic discus thrower (1936).
- Wayne Hansen, 58, American NFL footballer (Chicago Bears), bone cancer.
- W. W. Keeler, 79, American engineer and oilman, principal chief of the Cherokee Nation.
- Helmer Pedersen, 57, Danish-born New Zealand Olympic sailor (1964).
- Bayard Rustin, 75, American civil and gay rights activist, perforated appendix.
- Robert Selfelt, 84, Swedish army officer and Olympic horse rider (1948).

=== 25 ===
- Héctor Abad Gómez, 66, Colombian doctor, university professor and human rights leader, murdered.
- Otto Höfler, 86, Austrian philologist specialising in Germanic studies.
- Finn Jensen, 72, Danish Olympic swimmer (1936).
- Sam Kahn, 75, South African politician, member of parliament.
- John Ortell Kingston, 68, American Trustee of the Davis County Cooperative Society, Utah.
- Avraham Levenbraun, 71, Romanian-born Israeli politician, member of the Knesset (1972–1977, 1981).
- Ken Radick, 80, American NFL player.
- Victor Stafford Reid, 74, Jamaican writer.
- Fernando Ramos da Silva, 19, Brazilian actor (Pixote), police shootout.
- Thomas Warner, 84, South African cricketer.

=== 26 ===
- Josep Balsells, 82, Spanish Olympic rower coxswain (1924).
- Alexandru Borbely, 76, Romanian footballer and coach.
- Vern Gardner, 62, American basketballer, stroke.
- John Goddard, 68, Barbadian cricketer, captain of West Indies Test team.
- Karl-Erik Johansson, 63, Finnish Olympic rower (1952).
- Marcelo Ramos Motta, 56, Brazilian writer, heart attack.
- Alberto Socarras, 78, Cuban-American flautist.
- Georg Wittig, 90, German chemist (Wittig reaction), Nobel laureate in Chemistry.

=== 27 ===
- Ben Branch, 59, American entrepreneur, jazz tenor saxophonist and bandleader.
- Joan Haythorne, 72, British actress.
- Scott La Rock, 25, American hip-hop disc jockey and music producer, murdered.
- Peter Mehringer, 77, American freestyle wrestler and Olympic gold medalist.
- Richard Mattern Montgomery, 75, American Air Force general.
- Charlie Smalls, 43, American composer and songwriter, burst appendix.
- Aleksanteri Toivola, 94, Finnish Olympic wrestler (1924, 1928).

=== 28 ===
- Lillian Chase, 93, Canadian physician, researcher in the treatment of diabetes.
- John Huston, 81, American film director and actor (The Maltese Falcon, The African Queen, Moulin Rouge), pneumonia.
- Hoàng Cơ Minh, 52, Vietnamese Navy commodore-admiral, leader of anti-communist resistance.
- Harold Samuel, 75, British founder of Land Securities.
- Gerhard Winther, 74, Norwegian Olympic race walker (1948, 1952).
- Jack Young, 62, Australian motorcycle speedway rider, Speedway World Champion.

=== 29 ===
- Naji al-Ali, 48–49, Palestinian cartoonist, assassinated.
- Archie Campbell, 72, American comedian and writer, heart attack.
- Hans Eidenbenz, 87, Swiss Olympic Nordic combined skier (1924, 1928).
- Bernadene Hayes, 75, American film and television actress (Some Like It Hot, Dick Tracy's Dilemma), heart problems.
- Lee Marvin, 63, American film and television actor (The Dirty Dozen, The Big Heat), heart attack.
- John R. Napier, 70, British primatologist, paleoanthropologist and physician.
- Jean Schlumberger, 80, French jewellery designer.
- Phillip Hagar Smith, 82, American electrical engineer (Smith chart).

=== 30 ===
- David Parker Gibbs, 76, American army general.
- Wade H. McCree, 67, American judge, Solicitor General of the United States, bone cancer.
- George Mikes, 75, Hungarian-born British journalist and writer, leukemia.
- Vic Silayan, 58, Filipino actor (Kisapmata, Of the Flesh), heart attack.
- John C. Sjogren, 71, American soldier in the U.S. Army, Medal of Honor recipient, cancer.
- Frank Stojack, 75, Canadian-born NFL footballer (Brooklyn Dodgers), wrestler (world champion), Alzheimer's disease.
- Dick Young, 69, American sportswriter (New York Daily News).

=== 31 ===
- Thomas Agro, 55, American gangster with the Gambino crime family.
- Nicole Chouraqui, 49, French economist and politician.
- Szilárd Kun, 52, Hungarian Olympic sports shooter (1952, 1956, 1964, 1968, 1972).
- Lenore Lonergan, 59, American stage and film actress, cancer.
- Francisco Núñez, 62, Argentine Olympic boxer (1948, 1956).

== Sources ==
- Liebman, Roy (2000). The Wampas Baby Stars: A Biographical Dictionary, 1922–1934. Jefferson, North Carolina: McFarland. ISBN 0-7864-0756-5.
