= Santa Clara Broncos men's basketball statistical leaders =

The Santa Clara Broncos men's basketball statistical leaders are individual statistical leaders of the Santa Clara Broncos men's basketball program in various categories, including points, assists, blocks, rebounds, and steals. Within those areas, the lists identify single-game, single-season, and career leaders. The Broncos represent Santa Clara University in the NCAA's West Coast Conference.

Santa Clara began competing in intercollegiate basketball in 1904. However, the school's record book does not generally list records from before the 1950s, as records from before this period are often incomplete and inconsistent. Since scoring was much lower in this era, and teams played much fewer games during a typical season, it is likely that few or no players from this era would appear on these lists anyway.

The NCAA did not officially record assists as a stat until the 1983–84 season, and blocks and steals until the 1985–86 season, but Santa Clara's record books includes players in these stats before these seasons. These lists are updated through the end of the 2020–21 season.

== Scoring ==
Career
Rk	Player	Points	Seasons
1	Kevin Foster	2,423	2008–09 2009–10 2010–11 2011–12 2012–13
2	Jared Brownridge	2,313	2013–14 2014–15 2015–16 2016–17
3	Josip Vrankic	1,817	2017–18 2018–19 2019–20 2020–21 2021–22
4	Kurt Rambis	1,736	1976–77 1977–78 1978–79 1979–80
5	Harold Keeling	1,731	1981–82 1982–83 1983–84 1984–85
6	Brian Jones	1,722	1996–97 1997–98 1999–00 2000–01
7	Marc Trasolini	1,699	2008–09 2009–10 2010–11 2012–13
8	Steve Nash	1,689	1992–93 1993–94 1994–95 1995–96
9	Dennis Awtrey	1,675	1967–68 1968–69 1969–70
10	John Bryant	1,667	2005–06 2006–07 2007–08 2008–09

Season
Rk	Player	Points	Season
1	Kevin Foster	766	2010–11
2	Kevin Foster	732	2012–13
3	Jared Brownridge	640	2015–16
4	Brandin Podziemski	636	2022–23
5	Dennis Awtrey	619	1968–69
6	Dennis Awtrey	614	1969–70
7	Jared Brownridge	597	2016–17
8	John Bryant	596	2008–09
9	Jalen Williams	594	2021–22
10	Ralph Ogden	590	1969–70

Single game
Rk	Player	Points	Season	Opponent
1	Bud Ogden	55	1966–67	Pepperdine
2	Jared Brownridge	44	2015–16	Arizona
	Nick Vanos	44	1984–85	Loyola Marymount
	Russ Vrankovich	44	1963–64	Pepperdine
5	Mike Gervasoni	42	1966–67	Missouri
6	Ken Sears	41	1954–55	Pacific
7	Steve Nash	40	1994–95	Gonzaga
	Ralph Ogden	40	1969–70	Pepperdine
9	Ken Sears	39	1954–55	Saint Mary's
10	Brandin Podziemski	38	2022–23	Pacific
	Jared Brownridge	38	2015–16	Portland
	Jared Brownridge	38	2013–14	Pepperdine
	Steve Ross	38	2001–02	Gonzaga
	Mark McNamara	38	1978–79	Portland
	Dennis Awtrey	38	1969–70	UNLV

== Rebounds ==
Career
Rk	Player	Rebounds	Seasons
1	John Bryant	1,152	2005–06 2006–07 2007–08 2008–09
2	Dennis Awtrey	1,135	1967–68 1968–69 1969–70
3	Kurt Rambis	1,037	1976–77 1977–78 1978–79 1979–80
4	Nick Vanos	876	1981–82 1982–83 1983–84 1984–85
5	Ron Reis	851	1988–89 1989–90 1990–91 1991–92
6	Marc Trasolini	846	2008–09 2009–10 2010–11 2012–13
7	Jens Gordon	814	1985–86 1986–87 1987–88 1988–89
8	Josip Vrankic	801	2017–18 2018–19 2019–20 2020–21 2021–22
9	Mike Stewart	743	1970–71 1971–72 1972–73
10	Ken Sears	733	1951–52 1952–53 1953–54 1954–55

Season
Rk	Player	Rebounds	Season
1	John Bryant	467	2008–09
2	Dennis Awtrey	409	1969–70
3	Dennis Awtrey	386	1968–69
4	Joe Sheaff	362	1959–60
5	Dennis Awtrey	340	1967–68
6	Ron Reis	320	1990–91
7	Nick Vanos	317	1983–84
8	Kurt Rambis	313	1976–77
9	Nick Vanos	312	1984–85
10	John Bryant	298	2007–08

Single game
Rk	Player	Rebounds	Season	Opponent
1	Ken Sears	30	1954–55	Pacific
2	Fred Lavaroni	28	1970–71	Saint Mary's
3	Dennis Awtrey	27	1967–68	San Jose State
	John Bryant	27	2008–09	San Diego
5	Dennis Awtrey	24	1969–70	California
6	Dennis Awtrey	22	1967–68	Saint Mary's
	Kurt Rambis	22	1976–77	Saint Mary's
	John Turner	22	1963–64	Gonzaga
	John Bryant	22	2008–09	Loyola Marymount
	John Bryant	22	2008–09	Portland
	John Bryant	22	2008–09	Stanford

== Assists ==
Career
Rk	Player	Assists	Seasons
1	Evan Roquemore	578	2010–11 2011–12 2012–13 2013–14
2	Brian Jones	517	1996–97 1997–98 1999–00 2000–01
3	Steve Nash	510	1992–93 1993–94 1994–95 1995–96
4	Brody Angley	506	2004–05 2005–06 2006–07 2007–08
5	Eddie Joe Chavez	482	1974–75 1975–76 1976–77 1977–78
6	Kevin Foster	464	2008–09 2009–10 2010–11 2011–12 2012–13
7	Kyle Bailey	452	2000–01 2001–02 2002–03 2003–04 2004–05
8	Steve Kenilvort	423	1982–83 1983–84 1984–85 1985–86
9	John Woolery	422	1990–91 1991–92 1992–93 1993–94
10	Brandon Clark	410	2011–12 2012–13 2013–14 2014–15

Season
Rk	Player	Assists	Season
1	Evan Roquemore	196	2012–13
2	John Woolery	190	1993–94
3	Steve Nash	174	1994–95
	Steve Nash	174	1995–96
5	Kevin Foster	165	2012–13
6	Brody Angley	164	2005–06
7	Matt Hauser	162	2016–17
8	Evan Roquemore	158	2011–12
9	Brian Jones	155	1999–00
10	Eddie Joe Chavez	153	1977–78

Single game
Rk	Player	Assists	Season	Opponent
1	Steve Nash	15	1995–96	Southern
2	Eddie Joe Chavez	14	1976–77	Florida State
	John Woolery	14	1993–94	Chico State
4	Brody Angley	13	2007–08	Pepperdine
5	Eddie Joe Chavez	12	1975–76	California
	Steve Kenilvort	12	1984–85	Fresno State
	Mitch Burley	12	1988–89	UNC-Charlotte
	Steve Nash	12	1994–95	CS Fullerton
	Steve Nash	12	1995–96	Maryland

== Steals ==
Career
Rk	Player	Steals	Seasons
1	Harold Keeling	263	1981–82 1982–83 1983–84 1984–85
2	Kevin Foster	233	2008–09 2009–10 2010–11 2011–12 2012–13
3	Brian Jones	223	1996–97 1997–98 1999–00 2000–01
4	Kyle Bailey	196	2000–01 2001–02 2002–03 2003–04 2004–05
5	John Woolery	192	1990–91 1991–92 1992–93 1993–94
6	Brody Angley	173	2004–05 2005–06 2006–07 2007–08
7	Steve Nash	147	1992–93 1993–94 1994–95 1995–96
8	Josip Vrankic	146	2017–18 2018–19 2019–20 2020–21 2021–22
9	Chris Lane	142	1984–85 1985–86 1986–87 1987–88
10	Doron Perkins	137	2003–04 2004–05

Season
Rk	Player	Steals	Season
1	Kevin Foster	91	2012–13
2	Harold Keeling	82	1982–83
3	Chris Lane	77	1986–87
4	Harold Keeling	74	1983–84
	Doron Perkins	74	2004–05
6	Harold Keeling	73	1984–85
7	John Woolery	71	1992–93
8	John Woolery	70	1993–94
9	Allen Graves	67	2025–26
10	Brian Jones	65	1999–00

Single game
Rk	Player	Steals	Season	Opponent
1	Doron Perkins	10	2004–05	San Diego
2	Harold Keeling	7	1981–82	USF
	Harold Keeling	7	1983–84	Ohio State
	Harold Keeling	7	1984–85	Chico State
	John Woolery	7	1992–93	Loyola Marymount
	Kevin Foster	7	2012–13	Saint Louis

== Blocks ==
Career
Rk	Player	Blocks	Seasons
1	John Bryant	246	2005–06 2006–07 2007–08 2008–09
2	Marc Trasolini	176	2008–09 2009–10 2010–11 2012–13
3	Nick Vanos	159	1981–82 1982–83 1983–84 1984–85
4	Jens Gordon	133	1985–86 1986–87 1987–88 1988–89
5	Jaden Bediako	108	2019–20 2020–21 2021–22 2022–23
6	Yannick Atanga	94	2011–12 2012–13 2013–14 2014–15
7	Kurt Rambis	93	1976–77 1977–78 1978–79 1979–80
8	Josip Vrankic	86	2017–18 2018–19 2019–20 2020–21 2021–22
9	Robert Garrett	81	2011–12 2012–13 2013–14
10	Nate Kratch	79	2013–14 2014–15 2015–16 2016–17

Season
Rk	Player	Blocks	Season
1	John Bryant	84	2008–09
2	John Bryant	76	2007–08
3	Nick Vanos	67	1983–84
4	Nick Vanos	57	1984–85
5	Marc Trasolini	54	2012–13
6	Marc Trasolini	50	2009–10
7	John Bryant	49	2006–07
8	Jens Gordon	48	1987–88
9	Parker Braun	42	2021–22
10	Robert Garrett	41	2012–13

Single game
Rk	Player	Blocks	Season	Opponent
1	Kurt Rambis	10	1976–77	USF
