= Listach =

Listach is a family name and may refer to:

- Nora Listach (born 1910), an American baseball player
- Pat Listach (born 1967), his grandson and also a baseball player
