= 1968–69 Santa Clara Broncos men's basketball team =

American college basketball season

1968–69 Santa Clara Broncos men's basketball

West Coast Athletic Conference champions

NCAA tournament, Elite Eight
- Conference: West Coast Athletic Conference

Ranking
- Coaches: No. 4
- AP: No. 3
- Record: 27–2 (13–1 WCAC)
- Head coach: Dick Garibaldi
- Home arena: San Jose Civic Auditorium

1968–69 West Coast Athletic Conference men's basketball standings
	Conf.				Overall
Team	W		L	PCT	W		L	PCT
No. 3 Santa Clara	13	–	0	1.000	27	–	2	.931
San Jose State		–		–	16	–	8	.667
Pacific	7	–	5	.583	17	–	9	.654
UC Santa Barbara	8	–	4	.667	17	–	9	.654
Pepperdine	6	–	6	.500	14	–	12	.538
Loyola (Calif.)	3	–	9	.250	6	–	19	.240
Saint Mary's	3	–	9	.250	6	–	19	.240
San Francisco	3	–	10	.231	7	–	18	.280
Rankings from AP poll

The 1968–69 Santa Clara Broncos men's basketball team represented Santa Clara University as a member of the West Coast Athletic Conference during the 1968–69 NCAA University Division men's basketball season. They finished the season with a 27–2 record (13–1 WCAC) and made the NCAA tournament, reaching the Elite Eight before falling to mighty UCLA for the second straight season. They were led by head coach Dick Garibaldi.

== Roster ==
1968–69 Santa Clara Broncos men's basketball team
Players
Coaches

Pos.	#	Name	Height	Weight	Year	Hometown
F		Bud Ogden	6 ft 6 in (1.98 m)	—	Sr	San Luis Obispo, California
F		Ralph Ogden	6 ft 5 in (1.96 m)	—	Jr	San Luis Obispo, California
C		Dennis Awtrey	6 ft 10 in (2.08 m)	225 lb (102 kg)	Jr

Head coach

- Dick Garibaldi

Assistant coach(es)

Legend

- (C) Team captain
- (S) Suspended
- (I) Ineligible
- (W) Walk-on
- Injured
- Current redshirt

== Schedule and results ==
Date time, TV	Rank^{#}	Opponent^{#}	Result	Record	Site city, state
Regular Season
Nov 30, 1968*		Nevada	W 101–64	1–0	San Jose Civic Auditorium; San Jose, California
Dec 3, 1968*	No. 18	UC Davis	W 94–66	2–0	San Jose Civic Auditorium; San Jose, California
Dec 6, 1968*	No. 18	at Fresno State	W 82–65	3–0	Selland Arena; Fresno, California
Dec 13, 1968*	No. 16	vs. No. 12 Houston; Cable Car Classic	W 75–50	4–0	San Francisco Civic Auditorium; San Francisco, California
Dec 14, 1968*	No. 16	at San Francisco; Cable Car Classic	W 78–56	5–0	San Francisco Civic Auditorium; San Francisco, California
Dec 20, 1968*	No. 10	North Texas State	W 46–31	6–0	San Jose Civic Auditorium; San Jose, California
Dec 23, 1968*	No. 9	Gonzaga	W 86–62	7–0	San Jose Civic Auditorium; San Jose, California
Dec 26, 1968*	No. 9	vs. West Virginia; Rainbow Classic	W 72–58	8–0	Honolulu International Center; Honolulu, Hawaii
Dec 27, 1968*	No. 9	at Hawaii; Rainbow Classic	W 81–59	9–0	Honolulu International Center; Honolulu, Hawaii
Dec 28, 1968*	No. 9	vs. Columbia; Rainbow Classic	W 64–58	10–0	Honolulu International Center; Honolulu, Hawaii
Jan 1, 1969*	No. 6	Oklahoma City	W 92–82	11–0	San Jose Civic Auditorium; San Jose, California
Jan 4, 1969	No. 6	San Francisco	W 86–66	12–0 (1–0)	San Jose Civic Auditorium; San Jose, California
Jan 10, 1969	No. 3	Saint Mary's	W 70–49	13–0 (2–0)	San Jose Civic Auditorium; San Jose, California
Jan 11, 1969*	No. 3	Pacific	W 67–56	14–0 (3–0)	San Jose Civic Auditorium; San Jose, California
Jan 16, 1969	No. 3	at UC Santa Barbara	W 80–69	15–0 (4–0)	Rob Gym; Santa Barbara, California
Jan 18, 1969	No. 3	at San Jose State	W 62–49	16–0 (5–0)	Spartan Gym; San Jose, California
Jan 31, 1968*	No. 3	at Cal State Hayward	W 103–72	17–0	Pioneer Gymnasium; Hayward, California
Feb 3, 1969*	No. 3	San Francisco State	W 72–59	18–0	San Jose Civic Auditorium; San Jose, California
Feb 7, 1969	No. 3	Loyola Marymount	W 82–65	19–0 (6–0)	San Jose Civic Auditorium; San Jose, California
Feb 8, 1969	No. 3	Pepperdine	W 88–60	20–0 (7–0)	San Jose Civic Auditorium; San Jose, California
Feb 15, 1969	No. 3	at San Francisco	W 72–47	21–0 (8–0)	War Memorial Gymnasium; San Francisco, California
Feb 21, 1969	No. 2	at San Jose State	L 69–73 ^{2OT}	21–1 (8–1)	Spartan Gym; San Jose, California
Feb 22, 1969	No. 2	UC Santa Barbara	W 91–71	22–1 (9–1)	San Jose Civic Auditorium; San Jose, California
Feb 28, 1969	No. 4	at Pepperdine	W 62–52	23–1 (10–1)	Campus Gym; Malibu, California
Mar 1, 1969	No. 4	at Loyola Marymount	W 89–66	24–1 (11–1)	Loyola Memorial Gymnasium; Los Angeles, California
Mar 7, 1969	No. 3	at Pacific	W 81–69	25–1 (12–1)	Pacific Pavilion; Stockton, California
Mar 8, 1969	No. 3	at Saint Mary's	W 72–56	26–1 (13–1)	Madigan Gym; Moraga, California
NCAA Tournament
Mar 13, 1969*	No. 3	vs. Weber State; Regional semifinal – Sweet Sixteen	W 63–59 ^{OT}	27–1	Pauley Pavilion (11,700); Los Angeles, California
Mar 15, 1969*	No. 3	at No. 1 UCLA; Regional final – Elite Eight	L 52–90	27–2	Pauley Pavilion (12,812); Los Angeles, California
*Non-conference game. ^{#}Rankings from AP Poll. (#) Tournament seedings in parentheses. W=West. All times are in Pacific Time.
