= Marc Trasolini =

Canadian basketball player (born 1990)

Marc Trasolini マーク トラソリーニ
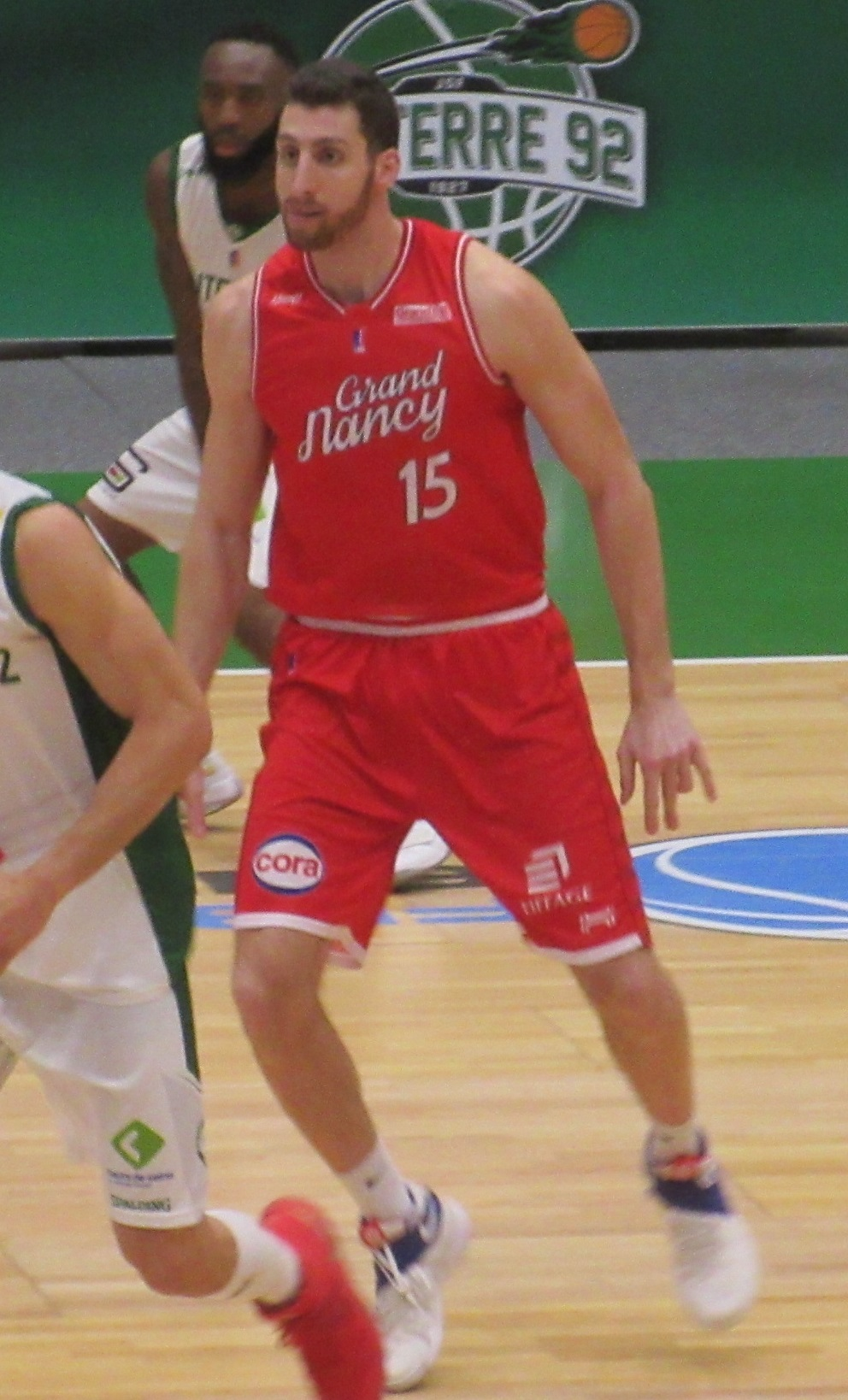

Personal information
- Born: June 21, 1990 (age 36) Vancouver, British Columbia
- Listed height: 6 ft 9 in (2.06 m)
- Listed weight: 245 lb (111 kg)

Career information
- High school: Vancouver College (Vancouver)
- College: Santa Clara (2008–2013)
- NBA draft: 2013: undrafted
- Playing career: 2013–2022
- Position: Power forward

Career history
- 2013–2014: U.S. Victoria Libertas Pallacanestro
- 2014–2015: S.S. Felice Scandone
- 2015–2016: Polisportiva Basket Agropoli
- 2016–2017: SLUC Nancy Basket
- 2017–2020: Levanga Hokkaido
- 2020-2022: Ibaraki Robots

Marc Christian Trasolini (born June 21, 1990) is a former Canadian professional basketball player. He played college basketball for Santa Clara.

Trasolini signed with the Ibaraki Robots on June 25, 2020.

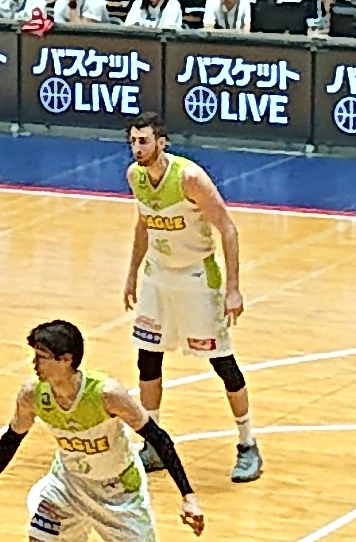

== Career statistics ==
Legend
GP	Games played	GS	Games started	MPG	Minutes per game
FG%	Field goal percentage	3P%	3-point field goal percentage	FT%	Free throw percentage
RPG	Rebounds per game	APG	Assists per game	SPG	Steals per game
BPG	Blocks per game	PPG	Points per game	**Bold**	Career high

Year	Team	GP	GS	MPG	FG%	3P%	FT%	RPG	APG	SPG	BPG	PPG
2017-18	Hokkaido	56	38	26.5	.555	.418	.815	7.4	1.9	1.5	1.3	19.0
2018-19	Hokkaido	45	43	33.4	.438	.285	.753	8.0	2.0	1.5	1.0	17.7
