= St. Loman's Hospital, Mullingar =

Hospital in Mullingar, Ireland

St. Loman's Hospital
- Health Service Executive
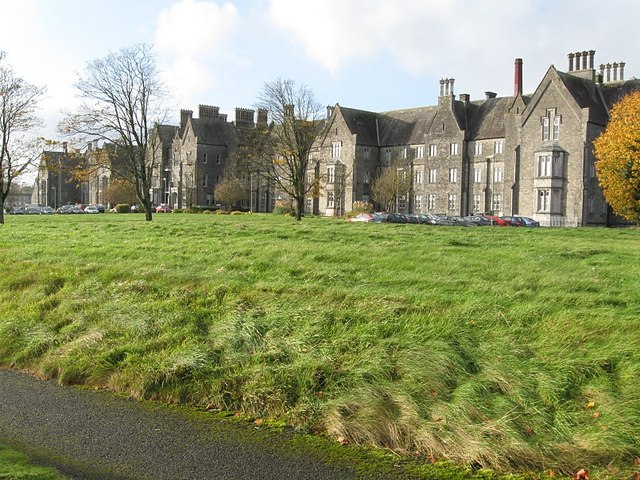
- Main block and entrance of the hospital

Geography
- Coordinates: 53°31′59.17″N 7°19′12.83″W

Organisation
- Care system: Health Service Executive
- Type: Specialist

Services
- Speciality: Psychiatric Hospital

History
- Founded: 23 August 1855; 170 years ago
- Closed: 5 December 2013; 12 years ago

Links
- Website: www.hse.ie/eng/services/list/1/lho/longford-westmeath/mental-health-services/

St. Loman's Hospital (Irish: Ospidéal Naomh Loman) was a psychiatric hospital located in Mullingar, County Westmeath in the Midlands of Ireland. The hospital closed on 5 December 2013 following the relocation of St Edna's Ward, which was the only remaining ward in the original Gothic building, to a new building on campus.

== History ==
=== Founding ===
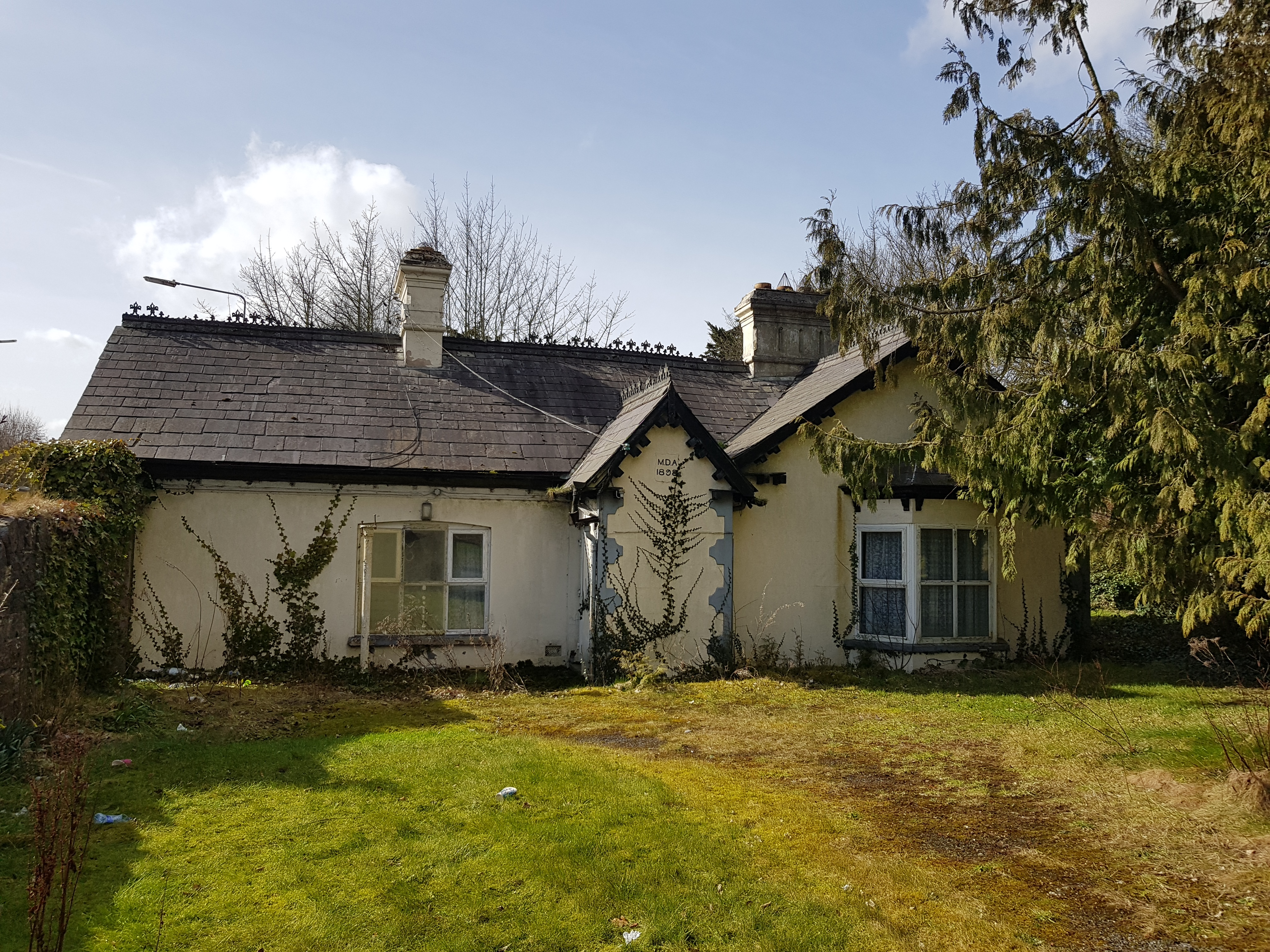
A gate lodge located adjacent to one of two entrances to the grounds of the hospital. This building was completed in c. 1898, possibly after the hospital got an extension three years prior and is now in use as an office

The building is a freestanding 41 bay, 3 storeyed psychiatric hospital built on twenty-five acres of land purchased in 1848 for £829 which eventually opened as the Mullingar District Lunatic Asylum on 23 August 1855. It was extended c. 1895 following the construction of a gate house and a red chimneystack. The hospital is a well-detailed Victorian institutional complex with its extensive Tudor Gothic detailing. The structure was built to designs by John Skipton Mulvany, possibly the most celebrated architect operating in Ireland at the time. It cost some £35,430 (equivalent to €3.2 million in today's money) to build, and was built to accommodate 300 patients. The first patients were transferred from the Richmond Surgical Hospital in Dublin, and all of them were female. In the grounds of the hospital, there are various buildings including a chapel which was constructed c. 1886, a nurses' home and an infirmary which were built c. 1940.

=== Incarceration, and past treatment of patients ===
Julia Caffrey Leonard, a housekeeper from nearby Trim, County Meath, was admitted into the hospital after she threw hot tea on her husband during an argument as she suspected him of adultery. She spent 22 years in the institution and protested as she knew she did not belong in such a place, neither did most of those who were confined in its walls. She died in the hospital on 10 February 1919, aged 54 due to myocardial degeneration.

Hanna Greally was born in Athlone on 21 April 1924, and was admitted to the hospital in 1943 at the age of 19 by the advice of her mother after Greally had just returned home from London where she had witnessed the horrors of the London Blitz while training to be a nurse. Bird's Nest Soup, a book written by Hanna and published in 1971, captured the haunting detail of other's lives stripped of human rights of "the unloved, social outcasts, the incurably embittered and the dispirited". Greally died at her home in County Roscommon in 1987, aged 62.

"The patients inside, expectant, waited for the letters and the visits, until finally, one day, they would find themselves rejects, outcasts, and no explanation given. Sometimes a crushed spirit breaks, from mental agony and anguish, when she understands at last she is captive in a free society." —Bird's Nest Soup, 1971

In 1958, a time referred to as the "pinnacle of confinement" was reached in Ireland when 21,000 patients were being confined behind mental hospital walls across Ireland, 0.7% of the general population. Mortality rates were high, with more than 11,000 deaths every decade between the 1920–1960 period.

=== Inspector of Mental Health Services report ===
After the introduction of deinstitutionalisation in the late 1980s the hospital went into a period of decline. In 2007, the Inspector of Mental Health Services report created a horrific picture of the appalling conditions which some residents have to endure in ageing psychiatric hospitals around the country. The Inspector called for two hospitals to be closed, urging that St Loman's be closed immediately. The Inspector made the following comments on St. Loman's conditions.

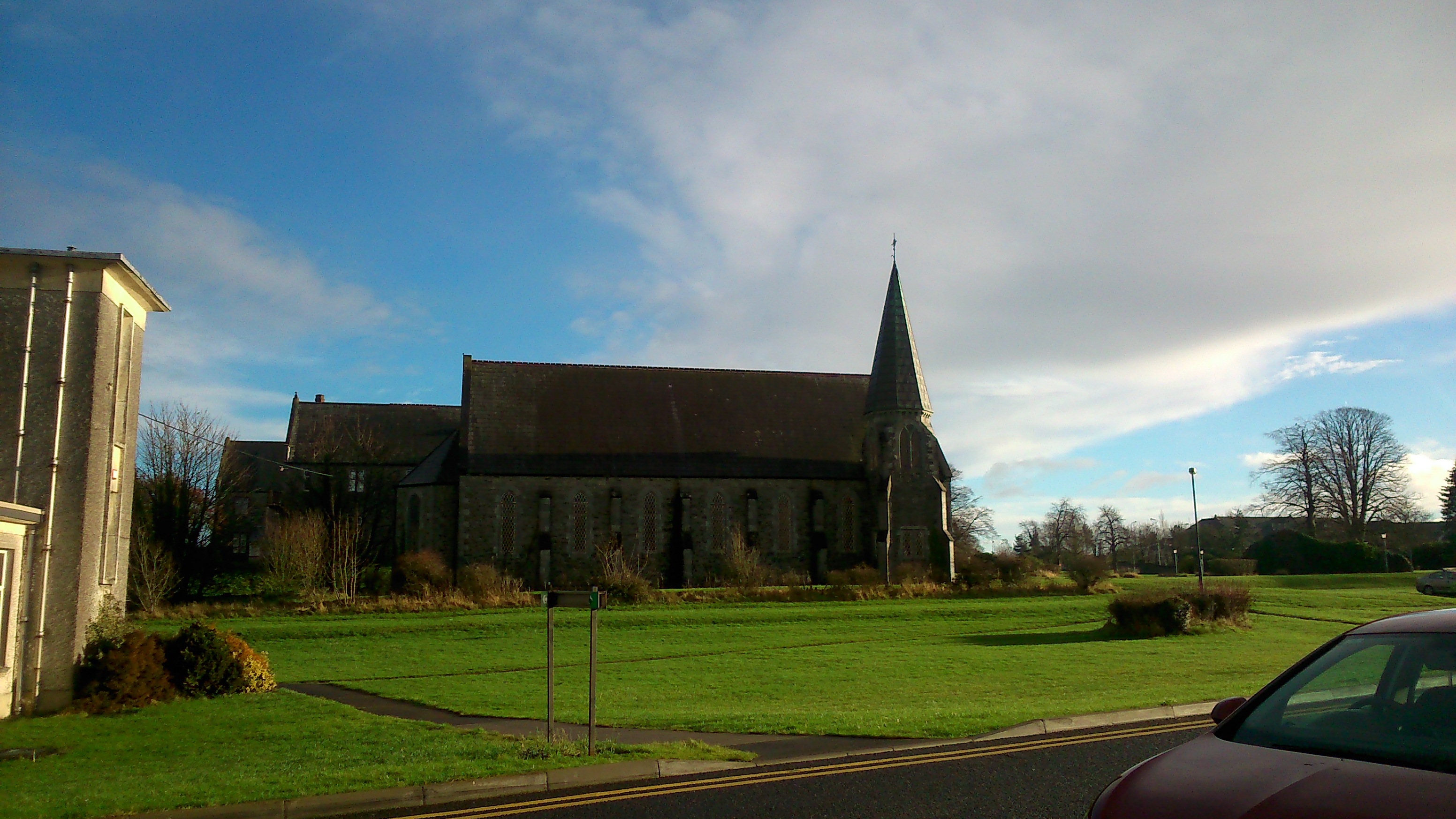
Church on the grounds of St. Lomans

"Apart from the admission units, the conditions in areas of St Loman's Hospital remained very poor with damp, peeling paint, tiles lifting on floors, poor sanitary facilities, curtains falling down and drab and institutional-style furnishings and decor. A significantly large number of these areas were dirty, including sluice rooms and bathrooms and toilets. In short, the conditions that people with enduring mental illness have to live in permanently in St Loman's Hospital were deplorable... every effort must be made to close the hospital immediately." —Inspector of Mental Health Services Report, 2007

=== Dr Muthulingam Kasiraj ===
In 2016, a Medical Council inquiry had found a junior doctor, Dr Muthulingam Kasiraj, also known as Dr Sripathy, who had worked as a senior house officer at St Loman's Psychiatric hospital for a period of approximately six months between July 2013 and January 2014, guilty of poor professional performance on several counts. Allegations made against the doctor included that he did not have basic knowledge of cardiopulmonary resuscitation (CPR), did not know the difference between some generic and branded drugs, did not know how to dial 999, was incapable of interpreting simple blood tests, did not understand the effects of some drugs on the liver, and that he wrote up wrong doses for drugs (supposedly no patients were harmed). Mr Kasiraj was also accused of being responsible for incomplete note taking. In Mr Kasiraj's defence, he claimed that anankastic personality disorder, which he was diagnosed with after the time period in question, had "affected" his performance during the period in question. Mr Kasiraj had worked in the child and adolescent psychiatric services in Mullingar for the approximate six months prior to securing his position at St Loman's Psychiatric Hospital.
