= Edgar van Tuyll =

Swiss mathematician

Edgar van Tuyll was the chief quantitative strategist of Pictet & Cie, where he worked from 1995 to 2017. He has been extensively quoted by the media for his prediction of the 2000 Dot-com bubble crash and of the growing market beginning in March 2003. He is among the minority of strategists expecting a US recession in 2007–2008. His website Links to unsolved problems, prizes and research is top ranked by Google for list of unsolved problems in mathematics and physics. He is the author of several entries in the "CRC Concise Encyclopedia of Mathematics", Chapman & Hall, 2002. He is the grandson of Antti Johannes Rantamaa.
