= Harold Keeling =

American-born Venezuelan basketball player

Personal information
- Born: September 18, 1963 (age 63) New Orleans, Louisiana, U.S.
- Listed height: 6 ft 4 in (1.93 m)
- Listed weight: 185 lb (84 kg)

Career information
- High school: Abraham Lincoln (San Francisco, California)
- College: Santa Clara (1981–1985)
- NBA draft: 1985: 3rd round, 63rd overall pick
- Drafted by: Dallas Mavericks
- Playing career: 1986–2004
- Position: Point guard
- Number: 43

Career history
- 1986: Dallas Mavericks
- 1986: Manila Beer
- 1987: Guaiqueries de Margarita
- 1987–1989: Maccabi Ramat Gan
- 1989–1990: La Rochelle
- 1990–1991: CRO Lyon Basket
- 1991: Marinos De Oriente
- 1991–1992: CRO Lyon Basket
- 1992: Mulhouse
- 1993: Marinos De Oriente
- 1994: Margarita Quaigueries
- 1995: Bravos DeLara
- 1995: Barranquilla
- 1996–1997: Toros De Aragua
- 1998–2004: Marinos De Oriente
- Stats at NBA.com
- Stats at Basketball Reference
Medals
Men's basketball
Representing Venezuela
South American Basketball Championship
Bronze medal – third place	2001 Valdivia	National team

Harold A. Keeling (born September 18, 1963) is an American-born Venezuelan former professional basketball player who briefly played for the Dallas Mavericks in the National Basketball Association (NBA) in the mid-1980s. Born in New Orleans, Louisiana, he attended Santa Clara University.

He was a member of the Venezuelan team during the 2001 Tournament of the Americas.

Keeling was a guest on Episode 72 of "An Eternity of Basketball," a video podcast that focuses on PBA (Philippines Basketball Association) in the 70's and 80's. On this episode outlined his playing career as:

1. 1981–1985 Santa Clara (College)
2. 1985–1986 Dallas Mavericks (NBA)
3. 1986 Manila Beer (the Philippines)
4. 1987 Guaiqueries de Margarita (Venezuela)
5. 1987–1989 Maccabi Ramat Gan (Israel)
6. 1989–1990 La Rochelle (France)
7. 1990–1991 Lyon Cro (France)
8. 1990 Marinos De Oriente (Venezuela) – CHAMPION
9. 1991–1992 Lyon Cro (France) – CHAMPION
10. 1992 Mulhouse (France)
11. 1993–1994 Marinos De Oriente (Venezuela) – CHAMPION
12. 1995 Bravos de Lara (Venezuela)
13. 1995 Columbia Baranquilla (Venezuela) – CHAMPION
14. 1996–1997 Toros de Aragua (Venezuela)
15. 1998–2004 Marinos De Oriente (Venezuela) – CHAMPION in 1998, 2003, and 2004

== Career statistics ==
Legend
GP	Games played	GS	Games started	MPG	Minutes per game
FG%	Field goal percentage	3P%	3-point field goal percentage	FT%	Free throw percentage
RPG	Rebounds per game	APG	Assists per game	SPG	Steals per game
BPG	Blocks per game	PPG	Points per game	**Bold**	Career high

=== NBA ===
==== Regular season ====
Year	Team	GP	GS	MPG	FG%	3P%	FT%	RPG	APG	SPG	BPG	PPG
1985–86	Dallas	20	0	3.8	.436	–	.714	.3	.5	.4	.0	2.2

==== Playoffs ====
Year	Team	GP	GS	MPG	FG%	3P%	FT%	RPG	APG	SPG	BPG	PPG
1986	Dallas	1	0	1.0	–	–	–	.0	.0	.0	.0	.0
