= Jared Brownridge =

American basketball player

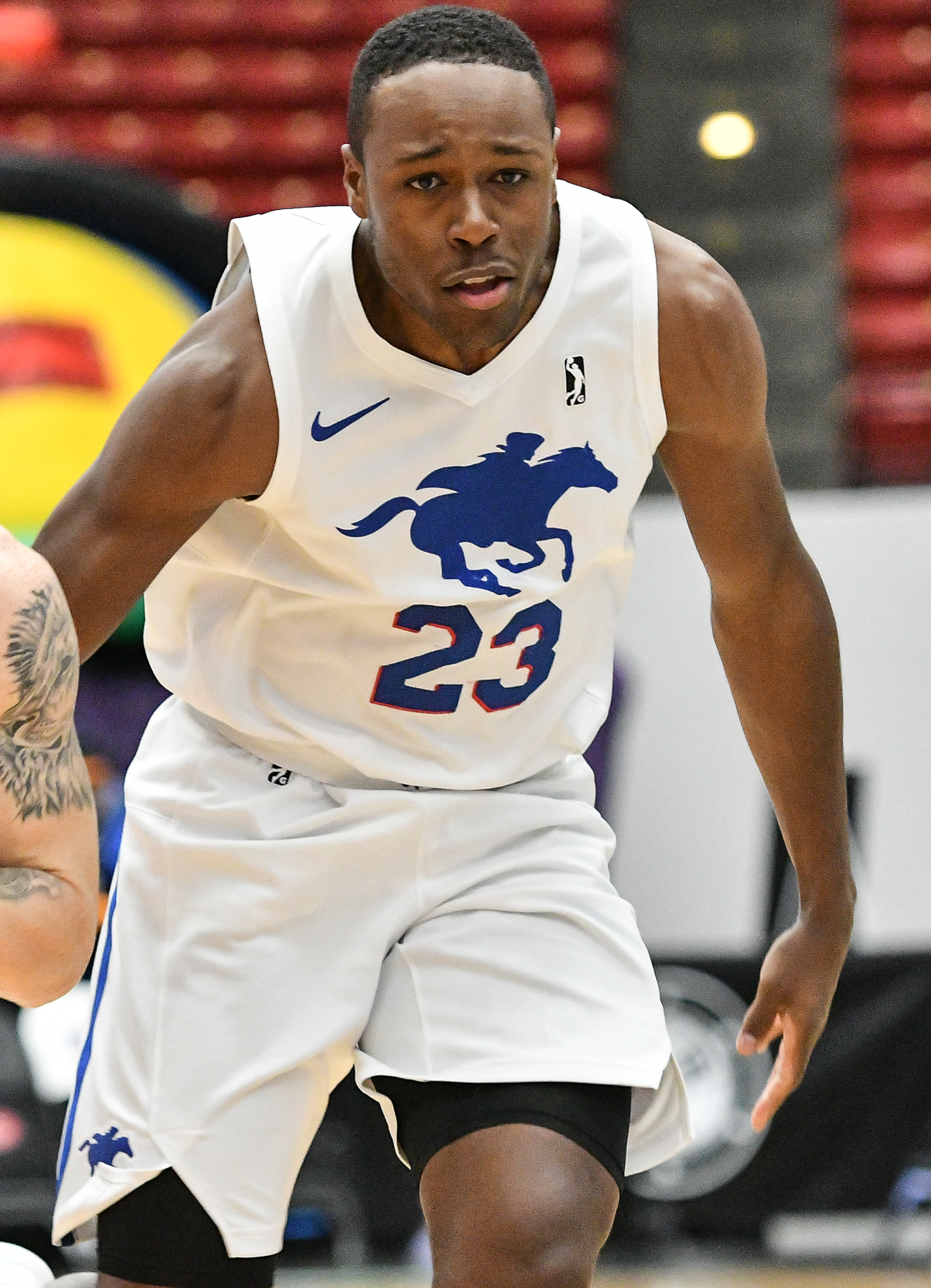
- Brownridge with the Delaware Blue Coats in 2019

Free agent
- Position: Shooting guard

Personal information
- Born: November 13, 1994 (age 32)
- Listed height: 6 ft 3 in (1.91 m)
- Listed weight: 200 lb (91 kg)

Career information
- High school: Waubonsie Valley (Aurora, Illinois)
- College: Santa Clara (2013–2017)
- NBA draft: 2017: undrafted
- Playing career: 2017–present

Career history
- 2017–2018: Pallacanestro Mantovana
- 2018–2025: Delaware 87ers / Blue Coats

Career highlights
- NBA G League champion (2023); 3× First-team All-WCC (2015–2017); WCC Newcomer of the Year (2014)
- Stats at NBA.com
- Stats at Basketball Reference

Jared Brownridge (born November 13, 1994) is an American professional basketball player who last played for the Delaware Blue Coats of the NBA G League. He played college basketball for the Santa Clara Broncos.

== College career ==
As a junior, Brownridge posted 20.6 points per game to lead the West Coast Conference in scoring. Brownridge averaged 18.1 points, 2.7 rebounds, and 2.8 assists per game as a senior at Santa Clara. He finished as the second-leading scorer at Santa Clara with 2,313 points and was a three-time All-Conference selection.

== Professional career ==
=== Pallacanestro Mantovana (2017) ===
After going undrafted in the 2017 NBA draft, Brownridge signed with Italian team Pallacanestro Mantovana in July 2017.

=== Delaware 87ers / Blue Coats (2018–2025) ===
Brownridge signed with the Delaware 87ers in March 2018. During the 2018–19 season, he averaged 15.9 points per game. Brownridge averaged 15.3 points per game in the 2019–20 season, shooting 38.5 percent from three-point range, before the season was shut down due to the COVID-19 pandemic. On October 14, 2021, he was signed and subsequently waived by the Philadelphia 76ers. On December 26, 2022, Brownridge was reacquired by the Delaware Blue Coats, and eventually helped the team win the NBA G League title.

On October 21, 2023, Brownridge was, again, signed by the 76ers, but was waived the same day and eight days later, he re-joined the Blue Coats.

On September 4, 2024, Brownridge signed again with the 76ers, but was waived the same day. On October 28, he rejoined the Blue Coats.

== Personal life ==
In March 2020, Brownridge created the podcast J.B. & Co.
