= Pat Listach =

American baseball player and coach (born 1967)

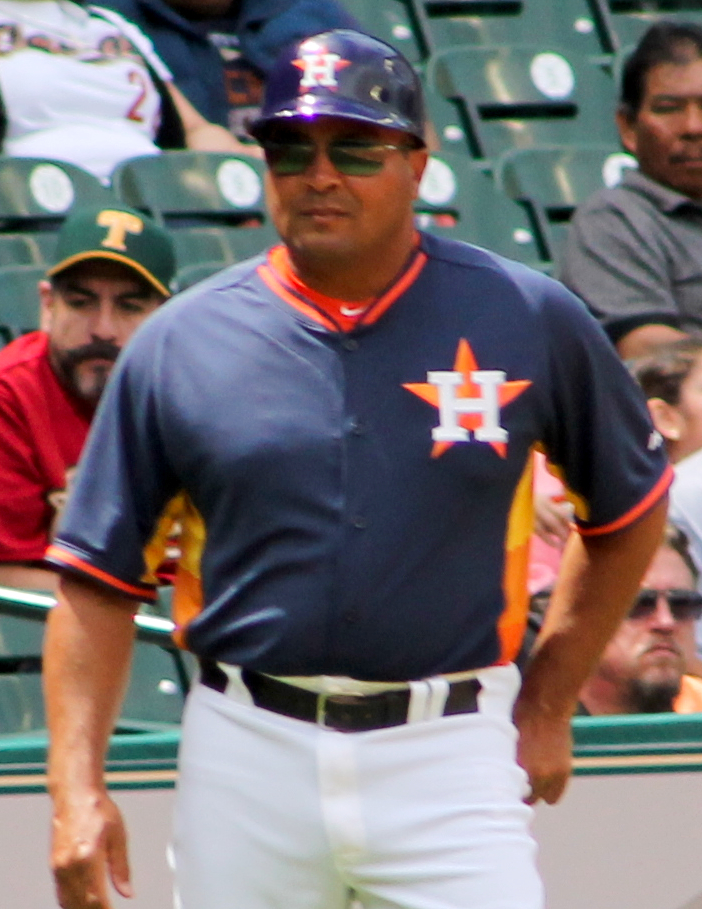
- Listach as the third base coach for the Houston Astros in 2014.
- Shortstop
- Born: September 12, 1967 (age 59); Natchitoches, Louisiana, U.S.
- Batted: Switch Threw: Right

MLB debut
- April 8, 1992, for the Milwaukee Brewers

Last MLB appearance
- June 29, 1997, for the Houston Astros

MLB statistics
- Batting average: .251
- Home runs: 5
- Runs batted in: 143
- Stats at Baseball Reference

Teams
- As player: Milwaukee Brewers (1992–1996); Houston Astros (1997); As coach: Washington Nationals (2009–2010); Chicago Cubs (2011–2013); Houston Astros (2014)

Career highlights and awards
- AL Rookie of the Year (1992); Milwaukee Brewers Wall of Honor

Patrick Alan Listach (born September 12, 1967) is an American professional baseball shortstop, coach, and manager. As a player, Listach appeared in Major League Baseball for the Milwaukee Brewers and Houston Astros from 1992 and 1997. He won the American League Rookie of the Year Award in 1992. Listach has also been a major league third base coach and minor league manager.

== Amateur career ==
A native of Natchitoches, Louisiana, Listach is the grandson of fellow major leaguer Nora Listach. He attended Natchitoches High School and went on to McLennan Community College in Waco, Texas, where he played college baseball for the Highlanders. Listach transferred to Arizona State University, continuing his collegiate career with the Arizona State Sun Devils.

== Professional career ==
Listach was drafted in the fifth round of the 1988 Major League Baseball draft by the Milwaukee Brewers.

Listach's best professional season was in 1992, his rookie year. After being called up from the minor leagues by the Brewers in April, Listach became a vital member of a team that won 92 games and contended for the American League playoffs. Listach became the first Brewer to steal 50 or more bases in a single season. His 54 stolen bases in 1992 ranked second in the American League, only to the total accrued by Kenny Lofton, another prominent rookie from the Cleveland Indians, during that season. Listach would go on to win the 1992 American League Rookie of the Year award.

In 1996, Listach was traded to the New York Yankees along with Graeme Lloyd for outfielder Gerald Williams and pitcher Bob Wickman. With rookie Derek Jeter installed at shortstop, the Yankees intended to use Listach as a backup outfielder, as they made the trade specifically to acquire Lloyd. Listach, however, had suffered what was first thought to be a bruise two days prior to the trade. The injury turned out to be a broken bone in his foot. The Yankees returned Listach to the Brewers, accepting shortstop Gabby Martinez, and pitcher Ricky Bones instead.

Listach played only 52 games in the majors after 1996, all for the Houston Astros in 1997. Listach spent 1998 Spring Training with the Seattle Mariners, who released him before the season. He spent that season with the Triple-A affiliates of the Cleveland Indians and Philadelphia Phillies before retiring.

== Coaching career ==
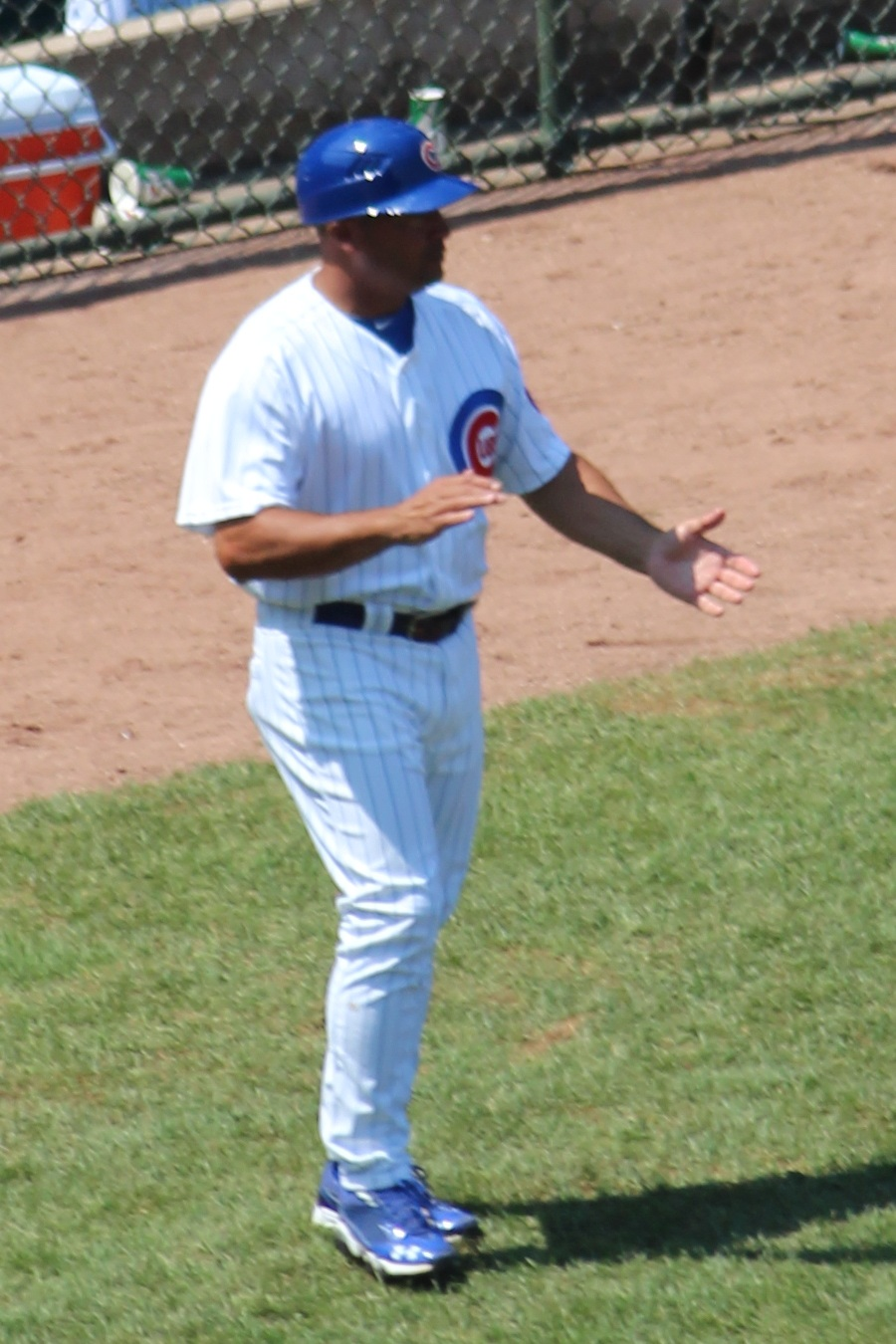
as 2012 Chicago Cubs 3rd base coach

Listach became a manager in the Chicago Cubs minor league system. He managed the Double-A West Tenn Diamond Jaxx in 2006, the Tennessee Smokies in 2007, and the Triple-A Iowa Cubs in 2008. In 2008 Listach was honored as Pacific Coast League Manager of the Year by peers and league media representatives for leading the Iowa Cubs to an 83-59 record and a playoff appearance.

Listach became the Washington Nationals' third-base coach starting with the 2009 season. He gained some minor attention for his role in a brawl between the Nationals and Florida Marlins, in which he dived into a pile and landed on top of Marlins starter Chris Volstad after the latter threw behind Nyjer Morgan, causing Morgan to charge the mound.

Listach served as bench coach for the Chicago Cubs for the 2011 season, replacing Alan Trammell who left to become the Diamondbacks bench coach. Listach was replaced by new bench coach, Jamie Quirk, during the 2011 off-season, and became the Cubs third-base coach for the 2012 season. He became the minor league infield coordinator for the Los Angeles Dodgers organization in 2013.

Listach was hired by the Houston Astros to be their first base coach on October 22, 2013; he was fired by the Astros on October 17, 2014.

Listach then returned to the Mariners' organization when he was named manager of the Triple-A Tacoma Rainiers of the Pacific Coast League, on January 12, 2015. Following the 2018 season, after compiling a 281-286 record in four seasons, the Mariners announced that Listach's contract with Tacoma was not being renewed.

On July 1, 2019, Listach was announced as the new manager of the Acereros de Monclova of the Mexican League. Despite joining the team midway through the season, he led them to a division championship, and later their first-ever league championship. After the 2020 Mexican League season was canceled due to the COVID-19 pandemic, Listach returned to the club for the 2021 season. They once again qualified for the playoffs, but fell to the Toros de Tijuana in the quarterfinals. Listach was dismissed by the team following the season.

On January 6, 2022, Listach was hired to serve as the manager for the Jersey Shore BlueClaws, the High-A affiliate of the Philadelphia Phillies organization.

On January 19, 2024, Listach was named the bench coach for the Charlotte Knights, the Triple-A affiliate of the Chicago White Sox. He was promoted to manager during the season. On January 18, 2025, Listach was announced as the bench coach for the Winston-Salem Dash, Chicago's High-A affiliate. On January 22, 2026, Listach was promoted to serve as the bench coach for Triple-A Charlotte.
