= Jim Veitch =

Australian rules footballer

Personal information
- Full name: James Veitch
- Born: 8 January 1905; Collingwood, Victoria
- Died: 3 August 1987 (aged 82); Caulfield South, Victoria
- Height: 185 cm (6 ft 1 in)
- Weight: 80 kg (176 lb)

Playing career^{1}
Years	Club	Games (Goals)
1930	Hawthorn	4 (0)
- ^{1} Playing statistics correct to the end of 1930.

Jim Veitch (8 January 1905 – 3 August 1987) was an Australian rules footballer who played with Hawthorn in the Victorian Football League (VFL).
