= Bernard Michaux =

Luxembourgish footballer

Personal information
- Date of birth: 7 September 1921
- Place of birth: Dudelange, Luxembourg
- Date of death: 15 August 1987 (aged 65)
- Place of death: Luxembourg, Luxembourg

Senior career*
Years	Team	Apps	(Gls)
1938–1958	Stade Dudelange		

International career
1945–1957	Luxembourg	46	(0)
- * Club domestic league appearances and goals

Bernard Michaux (7 September 1921 – 15 August 1987) was a Luxembourgish footballer. He competed in the men's tournament at the 1948 Summer Olympics.
