= Walter Kondratovich =

American football player and coach (1924–1987)

Biographical details
- Born: April 5, 1924
- Died: August 13, 1987 (aged 63)

Playing career
- 1944–1945: Columbia
- Position: Quarterback

Coaching career (HC unless noted)
- 1949–1959: Bridgeport

Walter Kondratovich (April 5, 1924 – August 13, 1987) was an American football player and coach. He served as the head football coach at the University of Bridgeport in Bridgeport, Connecticut from 1949 to 1959. Kondratovich was a three-sport athlete at Warren Harding High School in Bridgeport. He was the starting quarterback at Columbia University in the mid-1940s under coach Lou Little.
