= Ralph Giannini =

American basketball player

Ralph "Toddy" Giannini (1917–1996), also known as "Hot Toddy", was an American basketball player. He was California Mr. Basketball at San Francisco Balboa High School in 1935, and a member of the 1940 All-American basketball team representing Santa Clara University. He and his collegiate teammates were known as the "Magicians of the Maplewood". In 1940 Giannini lead the All-American All-Star team to a 44–42 defeat of the Harlem Globetrotters before a crowd of 22,000 fans at Madison Square Garden. He was inducted into the San Francisco Prep Hall of Fame and Santa Clara University's Hall of Fame.

== See also ==
- 1940 NCAA Men's Basketball All-Americans
