= Mike Stewart (basketball) =

American basketball player (born 1950)

Personal information
- Born: September 19, 1950 (age 75) San Francisco, California, U.S.
- Listed height: 6 ft 10 in (2.08 m)

Career information
- High school: Poly (San Francisco, California)
- College: Santa Clara (1970–1973)
- NBA draft: 1973: 7th round, 120th overall pick
- Drafted by: Boston Celtics
- Playing career: 1973–1981
- Position: Center

Career history
- 1973–1974: Martinez Muirs
- 1974–1976: AS Berck
- 1976–1981: AS Monaco

Career highlights
- WCC Player of the Year (1972); 2× First-team All-WCC (1972, 1973)
- Stats at Basketball Reference

Michael Curtis Stewart (born September 19, 1950) is a retired American professional basketball player. He best known for his college career at Santa Clara University, where he was named the West Coast Conference Player of the Year in 1972. He is the father of former NBA player Michael "Yogi" Stewart.

== College career ==
Stewart, a 6'10" tall center, played college basketball at the University of Santa Clara, from 1970 to 1973. After redshirting in what would have been his sophomore year, he was a three-year starter for the Broncos, and he led the team in scoring all three years. As a junior in the 1971–72 season, Stewart averaged 21.2 points and 9.7 rebounds per game. He also shot a 64.7% in field goal percentage. He was named the WCC Player of the Year, and he was also named an All-American, by the Helms Athletic Foundation. His strong college season led to him being one of 28 players that was given an invitation to Team USA's training camp trials for the 1972 Munich Summer Olympics. However, he did not make the USA's 12 man 1972 Summer Olympics team.

Since Stewart had redshirted in college, he was eligible to be drafted professionally. He was drafted by the Chicago Bulls, in the 6th round of the 1972 NBA draft, with the 95th overall pick. He was also drafted by The Floridians of the American Basketball Association (ABA). However, he chose to return to Santa Clara for his final season of college eligibility. In his final college season, Stewart averaged 18.7 points and 9.0 rebounds per game. He was again named to the All-West Coast Conference First team. He was inducted into Santa Clara's Athletics Hall of Fame in 1987.

== Professional career ==
In the 1973 NBA draft, Stewart was selected in the 7th round, by the Boston Celtics, with the 120th overall pick of the draft. However, he never played in the NBA. He instead played briefly in the Western Basketball League, with the Martinez Muirs. Stewart then headed to France, where he played for seven years, with AS Berck and AS Monaco. He was a standout for those teams, and he was later named to AS Monaco Basket's club Hall of Fame.

== Personal life ==
Mike Stewart is the father of Michael "Yogi" Stewart, who played several years in the NBA.
