= Antti Rantamaa =

Finnish priest

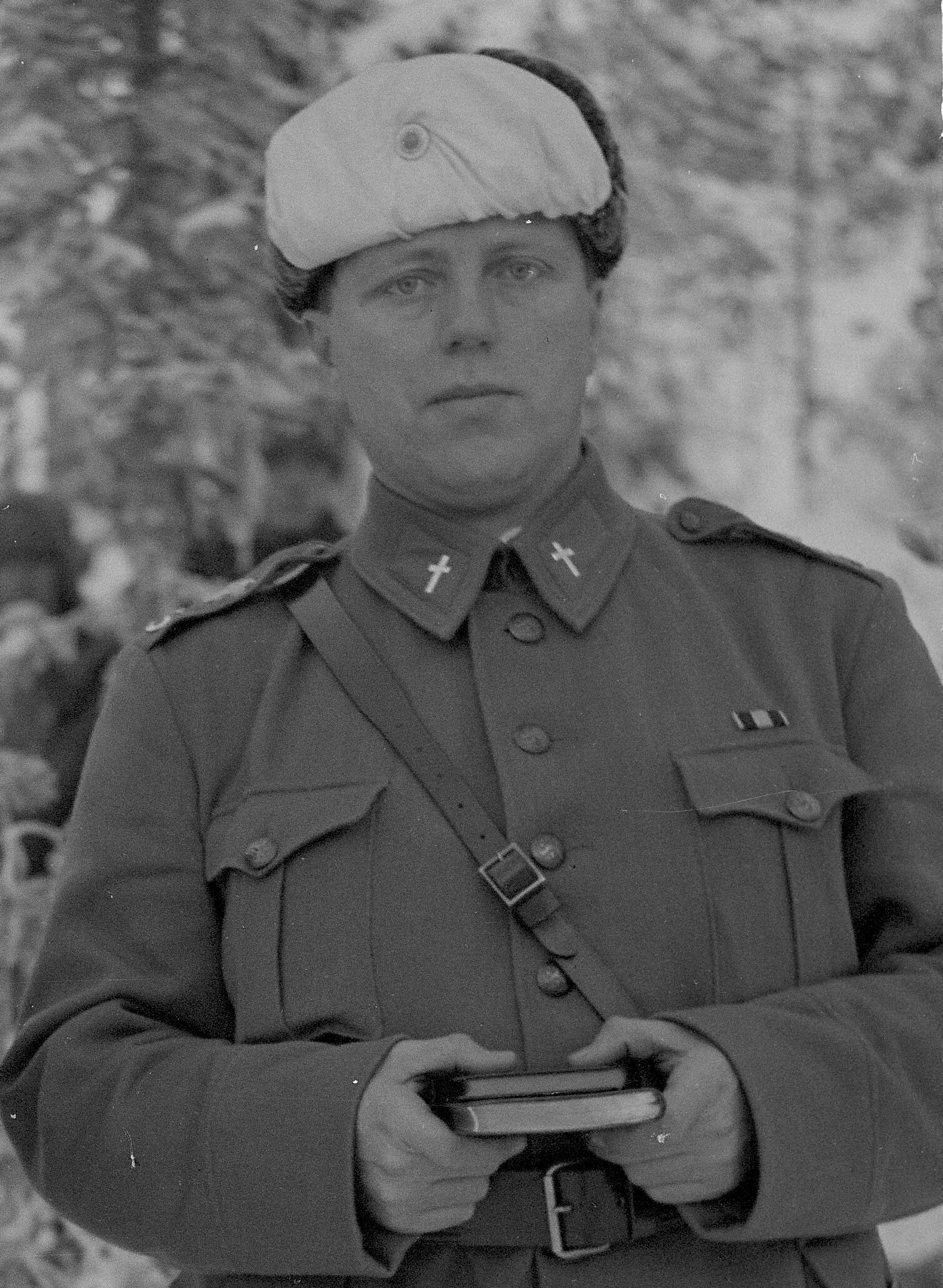
Antti Rantamaa in 1939

Antti Johannes Rantamaa (26 November 1904 – 17 August 1987) was a Finnish priest, member of the Finnish Parliament, figure of the Winter War, and author. He was one of the heads of the Evangelical Lutheran Church of Finland.

Rantamaa was born in Merikarvia, Finland in 1904. He is famous as the chaplain in the Finnish postcard depicting Christmas devotions said to have taken place in 1939 under enemy fire, causing it to cease. He died in Switzerland in 1987.

Rantamaa was a long-time member of parliament for the Agrarian League from Mikkeli Province, serving from 1939–1962.

== See also ==
- Edgar van Tuyll, grandson of Antti Johannes Rantamaa
- Simo Häyhä, a Finnish sniper and Winter War veteran, who served in the same company as Rantamaa
- Aarne Juutilainen, a famous figure of the Winter War, who also served in the same company as Rantamaa
