= Kevin Foster (basketball) =

American professional basketball player

Personal information
- Born: June 17, 1990 (age 36)
- Listed height: 6 ft 2 in (1.88 m)
- Listed weight: 211 lb (96 kg)

Career information
- High school: Morton Ranch (Katy, Texas)
- College: Santa Clara (2008–2013)
- NBA draft: 2013: undrafted
- Playing career: 2013–2015
- Position: Point guard / shooting guard

Career history
- 2013: Beşiktaş
- 2014–2015: Interclube

Career highlights
- 2x First-team All-WCC (2011, 2013); WCC Co-Newcomer of the Year (2009); WCC All-Freshman Team (2009); CIT MVP (2011); CBI MVP (2013)

Kevin Joseph Foster (born June 17, 1990) is an American professional basketball player who last played for Beşiktaş of the Turkish Basketball League (TBL). The 6 ft 2 in (1.88 m) shooting guard played college basketball for Santa Clara University between 2008–09 and 2012–13. Foster made 431 three-point field goals in his career, which is tied for the fourth-most all-time in NCAA Division I history. He finished his collegiate career as Santa Clara's all-time leading scorer with 2,423 points, which is also the most in San Francisco Bay Area Division I history and second most in West Coast Conference history. Foster holds a rare distinction of being named a most valuable player (MVP) in two different postseason tournaments: the 2011 CollegeInsider.com Postseason Tournament (CIT) and the 2013 College Basketball Invitational (CBI), both of which Santa Clara won.

== High school career ==
Foster, a native of Katy, Texas, attended Morton Ranch High School. As a junior he was named to the All-District 18-5A First Team and the All-Greater Houston Second Team. In his senior year, Foster averaged 21 points per game and was named the MVP and All-District 18-5A First Team. He was also a Texas top-30 player his final season.

== College career ==
In his freshman season in 2008–09, Foster averaged 14.7 points and 2.5 assists per game and was named the WCC Co-Newcomer of the Year, WCC All-Freshman Team and Freshman All-American Team. He broke Kurt Rambis' freshman year scoring record, Steve Nash's single-season three-pointers made record and four other freshman class records in the process. In his true sophomore year, he only played in six total games before suffering a season-ending foot injury, so he was able to redshirt the 2009–10 season.

In 2010–11, Foster was named to the WCC First Team after leading all of Division I in three-pointers made (140), attempted (380), and made per game (3.68). The Broncos were invited to participate in the 2011 CollegeInsider.com Postseason Tournament, which they won behind Foster's play as he was named its MVP. The following season, Foster was suspended for the rest of the season by the school after he was arrested for drunk driving in January 2012. He managed to play in only 18 games before the incident.

Foster's senior year in 2012–13 saw the Broncos finish with a 26–12 overall record en route to the 2013 CBI championship, where he was named its MVP. He averaged 19.3 points and 4.3 assists per game during the season. Milestones for Foster that season include scoring his 2,000th career point, breaking the conference record for three-pointers made, and eventually becoming the school's all-time leading scorer with 2,423 points.

== Professional career ==
=== 2013–14 season ===
Foster went undrafted in the 2013 NBA draft. On July 29, 2013, he signed with Beşiktaş of Turkey for the 2013–14 season. However, he later parted ways with Beşiktaş on October 29, 2013, after appearing in just two Eurocup games. That same day, he signed with Skyliners Frankfurt of the Basketball Bundesliga. His contract with Skyliners was voided a day later after he did not pass the medical examinations.

On February 7, 2014, Foster joined BK Ventspils of Latvia for a 10-day trial period but was ultimately not signed by the club.

=== 2014–15 season ===
On November 1, 2014, Foster was selected by the Reno Bighorns in the fourth round of the 2014 NBA G-League draft. However, he was later waived by the Bighorns on November 13, 2014.

== The Basketball Tournament ==
Kevin Foster played for Team Tampa 20/20 in the 2018 edition of The Basketball Tournament. He scored 11 points and grabbed five rebounds in the team's first-round loss to Ram Nation.

== See also ==
- List of NCAA Division I men's basketball season 3-point field goal leaders
- List of NCAA Division I men's basketball career 3-point scoring leaders
