= George Mayo (baseball) =

American baseball player

- First baseman
- Born: December 27, 1893; Morton, Pennsylvania, U.S.
- Died: August 22, 1987

Negro league baseball debut
- 1917, for the Hilldale Club

Last appearance
- 1917, for the Hilldale Club

Teams
- Hilldale Club (1917)

George Wallace Mayo (December 27, 1893 – August 22, 1987) was an American Negro league baseball first baseman in the 1910s.

A native of Morton, Pennsylvania, Mayo played for the Hilldale Club in 1917. In his six recorded games, he posted four hits in 20 plate appearances. Mayo died in 1987 at age 93.
