= Hanna Greally =

Irish author (1924–1987), involuntarily incarcerated in psychiatric hospital

- Born: Johanna Catherine Greally; 21 March 1924; Athlone, Ireland
- Died: 15 August 1985 (aged 61); Roscommon University Hospital, Roscommon, Ireland
- Occupation: Writer
- Known for: Incarcerated in a psychiatric hospital against her will for 18 years
- Notable work: Birds' Nest Soup; Flown the Nest

Johanna Catherine Greally (21 March 1924 – 15 August 1985) was an Irish writer who was detained against her will in St. Loman's Hospital in Mullingar, County Westmeath for almost two decades. A well-known local poet, there is an award event named after her called the Hanna Greally International Literary Awards, begun in 2007.

== Early life ==
Johanna Greally was born in Athlone, the eldest of two children, into a family who were very well-known in the town. Greally's mother, Mary, was born on 16 November 1902 to Peter and Mary Murray (née Dolan) in Athlone. Mary's parents married on 27 November 1901 in a town outside of Birr, County Offaly, which was then known as King's County. Greally's mother Mary was an only child and wealthy in her youth; she owned farmland, a prosperous business and an island in the River Shannon. Mary married James Greally on 25 June 1923 in St Andrew's Church in Dublin. Greally's father James died suddenly from cardiac failure aged 26 on 8 April 1928 which left her mother a widow, aged 25.

"She was always selling or renting something. In the beginning, it was always something big like Monk's Island on the river at home. She had inherited it and sold it for a sum when Father died, to pay death duties, she said. A hundred pounds for a hundred acres! Today, it sounds fantastic but Mother was satisfied. What use was a lonely hermitage to her? Alas, her furs went also and the best silver which used to be in the red velvet box in the best mahogany wardrobe. When the wardrobe was sold, among other things, life became very austere indeed." — Bird's Nest Soup, 1971

== The Blitz and admission to St. Loman's Hospital ==
Greally spent two years training at Guy's Hospital during The Blitz, and suffered with psychological trauma as a result. On learning her mother was ill, she returned home to Ireland and her mother suggested to Hanna that she go to St. Loman's Hospital "for a rest" as her mother could not care for her. This hospital was, and still is to a large extent, known to locals as The Big House. Initially on arrival in c.1943, she was placed in the on-site Admissions building which had only been completed three years prior in c.1940 in a typical layout for tuberculosis treatment and this building was "the closest to the outside world". Nothing was really done in relation to getting Hanna released from confinement as the person in control told Mary that Hanna should stay for a bit longer. After a few years had passed and many visits, her mother had died on 31 October 1950 in the County Hospital (now known as the Midland Regional Hospital, Mullingar), County Westmeath due to chronic interstitial nephritis and malignant hypertension, aged 47. Greally made several escape attempts, and sent pleading letters to her relatives to sign her out but remained incarcerated for 18 years due to legal difficulties at the time. Most ignored her pleas, and wrote about their lives in reply instead. She was subject to electroconvulsive therapy, sedatives, insulin coma, seclusion and confinement. Greally was transported to Coolamber Manor, a new rehabilitation centre in Longford which had just opened, in the late 1950s. As suggested by her Superintendent, she was placed there along with a few others, and was very excited with the news of moving out of Saint Loman's Hospital.

"One day in the laundry, the Superintendent called me. "Your chance, Hanna, it's come", he said. My heart jumped! What could he mean? He explained in detail, a new rehabilitation centre had been opened, and he had been requested to send two or three of his patients there. I was overjoyed, in fact, I could not believe it. Liberty in view at last, authorised freedom! I said, with random exhilaration, "At last, may I really leave here? My relations cannot stop me? They decant?" – an extract from Bird's Nest Soup, 1971.

In 1962, Greally was released from the rehabilitation centre after she spent her time there training to be a housekeeper. She went to England following her release, and worked as a housekeeper for a retired doctor and saved up to purchase a cottage called Sunny Acre in the Coolteige–Fourmilehouse area of Roscommon for IR£600, and this is where she resided for the rest of her life. She released a book in 1971, Birds' Nest Soup, detailing her harrowing experiences for herself and others, and this is regarded as the only true account of someone inside an institution during these times. Greally appeared on The Late Late Show, speaking to Gay Byrne about her experiences being incarcerated for so long the same year.

== Death ==
Greally died in Roscommon University Hospital on 15 August 1987, aged 63 after her general health had fallen following a heart and hand operation.
