= Norm Raines =

Australian rules footballer (1920–1987)

Personal information
- Full name: Norman Maxwell Raines
- Born: 22 September 1920; Bendigo, Victoria
- Died: 5 August 1987 (aged 66); Bendigo, Victoria
- Original team: Sandhurst
- Height: 183 cm (6 ft 0 in)
- Weight: 82 kg (181 lb)

Playing career^{1}
Years	Club	Games (Goals)
1940–41, 1943	St Kilda	19 (17)
- ^{1} Playing statistics correct to the end of 1943.

Norman Maxwell Raines (22 September 1920 – 5 August 1987) was an Australian rules footballer who played with St Kilda in the Victorian Football League (VFL).
