= Dick Garibaldi =

College basketball player and coach

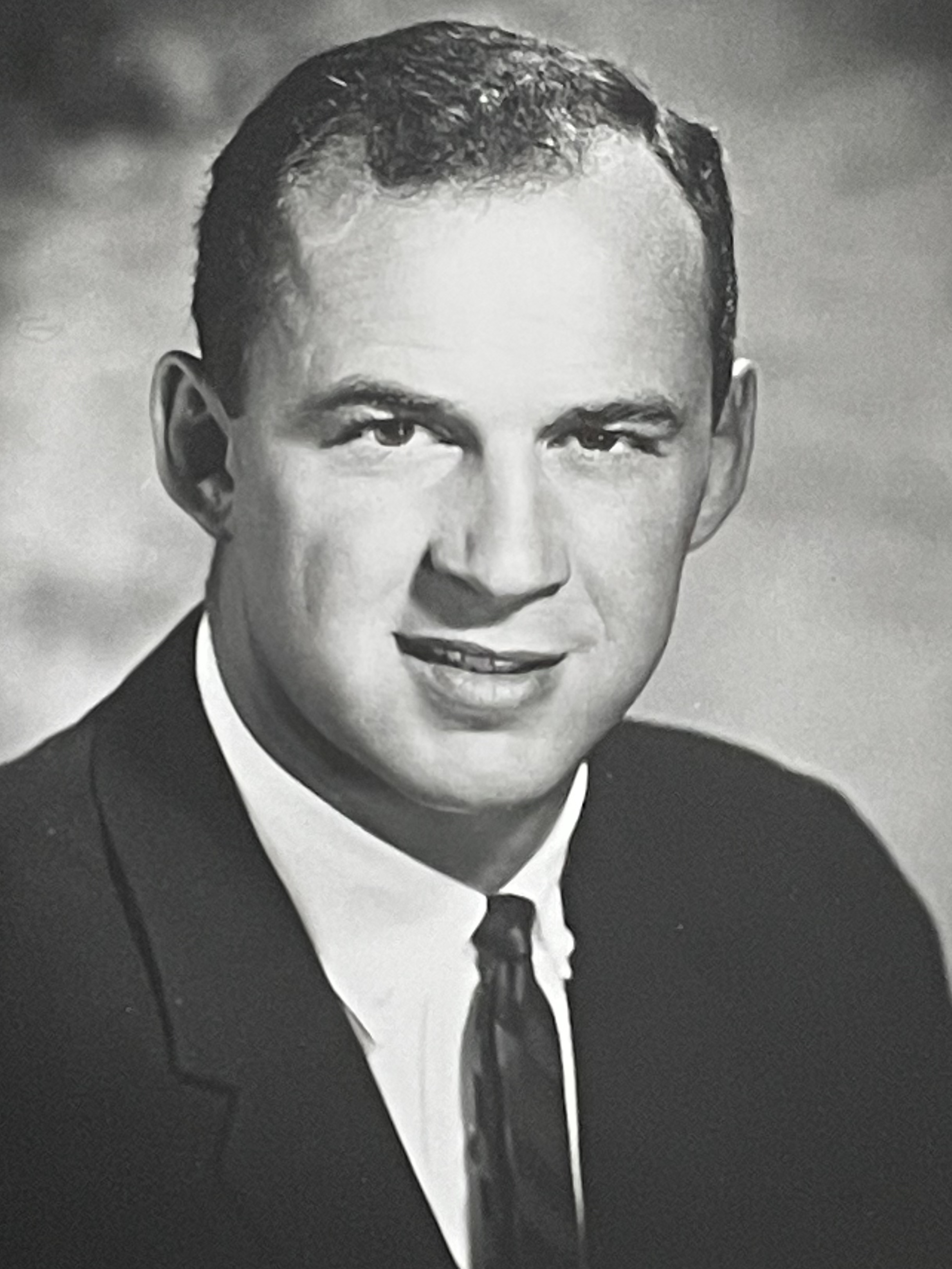

Biographical details
- Born: December 13, 1932; Stockton, California, U.S.
- Died: May 10, 2022; Stockton, California, U.S.

Playing career

Basketball
- 1951–1954: Santa Clara
- Position: Guard

Coaching career (HC unless noted)

Basketball
- 1958–1962: Santa Clara (assistant)
- 1962–1970: Santa Clara

Head coaching record
- Overall: 137–77 (.640)

Accomplishments and honors

Championships
- 3× WCC regular season (1968–1970)

Awards
- 3× WCC Coach of the Year (1968–1970); 3× Northern California Coach of the Year

Richard Andrew Garibaldi (December 13, 1932 – May 10, 2022) was an American college basketball coach and former player. He served as head coach of the Santa Clara Broncos during the 1960s, leading the program to national prominence, including a No. 2 ranking in the Associated Press poll and multiple NCAA Tournament appearances.

== Early life and playing career ==
Garibaldi was born in Stockton, California, on December 13, 1932. He attended Santa Clara University, where he played college basketball for the Broncos from 1952 to 1955. He was the older brother of Bob Garibaldi, who was a major league pitcher for the San Francisco Giants in the 1960s and the Most Outstanding Player in the College World Series in 1962.

As a player, Garibaldi was part of some of the most successful teams in Santa Clara history. The Broncos reached the Final Four in 1952 and advanced to the Elite Eight in 1953 and 1954. As a freshman and playing alongside the great Ken Sears, it was Garibaldi's driving layup in the last minute of the 1952 NCAA Western Regional Final that put the Broncos in the Final Four. As a senior in 1955 he earned All-WCAC Honors.

== Coaching career ==
In 1962, after 4 years as an assistant to head coach Bob Feerick, Garibaldi served as head coach of the Santa Clara Broncos during the 1962–63 season through 1970. Under his leadership, Santa Clara compiled a 137–77 overall record and achieved a No. 2 national ranking in the Associated Press poll.

His teams appeared in the NCAA Tournament in 1968, 1969 and 1970. From 1967 to 1970, Santa Clara posted a combined 73–12 record, including a school-record 21-game winning streak.

During his coaching tenure, Garibaldi was named West Coast Conference Coach of the Year three times (1968–1970) and Northern California Coach of the Year three times.

Garibaldi stepped away from coaching following the 1969–70 season to work for Converse.

== Notable players coached ==
- Dennis Awtrey – NCAA All-American, NBA champion
- Bud Ogden - NCAA All American
