= Paulo Navalho =

Portuguese footballer (1966–1987)

Personal information
- Full name: Paulo Jesus Navalho
- Date of birth: 24 December 1966
- Place of birth: Luanda, Portuguese Angola
- Date of death: 23 August 1987 (aged 20)
- Height: 1.90 m (6 ft 3 in)
- Position: Forward

Youth career
- –1981: Trafaria
- 1981–1982: Sporting
- 1982–1983: Oriental
- 1983–1986: Benfica

Senior career*
Years	Team	Apps	(Gls)
1986–1987	Guarda	19	(6)
1987	Atlético CP	0	(0)
Total		19	(6)

International career
1983–1984	Portugal U16	3	(0)
1985	Portugal U18	2	(0)
- * Club domestic league appearances and goals

Paulo Jesus Navalho (24 December 1966 – 23 August 1987) was a Portuguese professional footballer. Born in Angola, Navalho represented Portugal at youth international level. He died after suffering an acute myocardial infarction during a friendly game against Al Jazira Club of the United Arab Emirates.

== Career statistics ==
=== Club ===
Club	Season	League			Cup		Other		Total	
Club	Season	Division	Apps	Goals	Apps	Goals	Apps	Goals	Apps	Goals
Guarda	1986–87	Segunda Divisão	19	6	1	0	0	0	20	6
Atlético CP	1987–88	Segunda Divisão	0	0	0	0	0	0	0	0
Career total			19	6	1	0	0	0	20	6
