= Nick Vanos =

American basketball player (1963–1987)

Personal information
- Born: April 13, 1963 San Mateo, California, U.S.
- Died: August 16, 1987 (aged 24) Romulus, Michigan, U.S.
- Listed height: 7 ft 1 in (2.16 m)
- Listed weight: 255 lb (116 kg)

Career information
- High school: Hillsdale (San Mateo, California)
- College: Santa Clara (1981–1985)
- NBA draft: 1985: 2nd round, 32nd overall pick
- Drafted by: Phoenix Suns
- Playing career: 1985–1987
- Position: Center
- Number: 30

Career history
- 1985–1987: Phoenix Suns

Career highlights
- 2× First-team All-WCC (1984, 1985); No. 32 retired by Santa Clara Broncos
- Stats at NBA.com
- Stats at Basketball Reference

Nicolaas Peter Vanos (April 13, 1963 – August 16, 1987) was an American professional basketball player for the Phoenix Suns of the National Basketball Association (NBA). The San Mateo, California native was selected 32nd by the Suns in the 1985 NBA draft after playing at Hillsdale High School and Santa Clara University. He played only two seasons in the NBA, both of them for the Suns at center, ending with his death in a plane crash in 1987 at age 24.

Vanos and his girlfriend Carolyn Cohen both died as passengers on Northwest Airlines Flight 255, which crashed just after takeoff from the Detroit Metropolitan Airport on August 16, 1987. The two were on their way back to Phoenix after a visit to Cohen's parents in Michigan. The Sunday evening crash killed all but one of the 155 persons aboard, and two motorists on the ground.

== Career statistics ==
Legend
GP	Games played	GS	Games started	MPG	Minutes per game
FG%	Field goal percentage	3P%	3-point field goal percentage	FT%	Free throw percentage
RPG	Rebounds per game	APG	Assists per game	SPG	Steals per game
BPG	Blocks per game	PPG	Points per game	**Bold**	Career high

=== NBA ===
==== Regular season ====
Year	Team	GP	GS	MPG	FG%	3P%	FT%	RPG	APG	SPG	BPG	PPG
1985–86	Phoenix	11	0	**18.4**	.319	–	.348	**5.5**	**1.5**	.2	**.5**	**4.9**
1986–87	Phoenix	**57**	**14**	11.2	**.411**	.000	**.644**	3.2	.8	**.3**	.4	2.9
Career		68	14	12.4	.383	.000	.561	3.5	.9	.3	.4	3.3

== See also ==
- List of basketball players who died during their careers
