= Nora Listach =

American baseball player (1910–1987)

- Outfielder
- Born: March 22, 1910; Natchitoches, Louisiana, U.S.
- Died: August 14, 1987 (aged 77); Cincinnati, Ohio, U.S.
- Batted: Right Threw: Right

Negro league baseball debut
- 1941, for the Birmingham Black Barons

Last appearance
- 1941, for the Birmingham Black Barons
- Stats at Baseball Reference

Teams
- Birmingham Black Barons (1941)

Nora Listach (March 22, 1910 – August 14, 1987) was an American Negro league outfielder in the 1940s.

A native of Natchitoches, Louisiana, Listach was the grandfather of fellow major leaguer Pat Listach, and played for the Birmingham Black Barons in 1941. In nine recorded games, he posted eight hits in 31 plate appearances. Listach died in Cincinnati, Ohio in 1987 at age 77.
