= Santa Clara Broncos men's basketball =

Men's basketball of Santa Clara University

2026–27 Santa Clara Broncos men's basketball team
- University: Santa Clara University
- First season: 1904
- Head coach: Herb Sendek (11th season)
- Location: Santa Clara, California
- Arena: Leavey Center (capacity: 4,500)
- Conference: West Coast Conference
- Nickname: Broncos
- Colors: Maroon and white
- All-time record: 1,418–1,019 (.582)

NCAA Division I tournament Final Four
- 1952
Other NCAA Division I tournament results
Elite Eight	1952, 1953, 1954, 1968, 1969
Sweet Sixteen	1952, 1953, 1954, 1960, 1968, 1969, 1970
Appearances	1952, 1953, 1954, 1960, 1968, 1969, 1970, 1987, 1993, 1995, 1996, 2026

Conference tournament champions
- 1987, 1993

Conference regular-season champions
- 1953, 1954, 1960, 1968, 1969, 1970, 1995, 1996, 1997

Uniforms
Home	Away	Alternate

The Santa Clara Broncos men's basketball team represents Santa Clara University in NCAA Division I basketball competition. The team plays home games at the Leavey Center in Santa Clara, California and have been members of the West Coast Conference since its formation in 1952. The team is currently coached by Herb Sendek.

Santa Clara has a long history of basketball success, having appeared in 12 NCAA Tournaments, most recently in 2026. Historically, Santa Clara has produced a number of NBA players, including Hall of Famer Steve Nash, Kurt Rambis and Kenny Sears. In the 2022, 2023 and 2026 seasons, Santa Clara produced a first round draft pick in the NBA draft, Jalen Williams, Brandin Podziemski and Allen Graves.

== History ==
Basketball made its inauspicious debut at Santa Clara in 1904 with a 9–7 victory over Alameda High School. Later that year, Santa Clara played its first intercollegiate game, a loss to the University of the Pacific, then located just down the road from Santa Clara. Early schedules composed of high school and YMCA opponents gave way to wholly intercollegiate schedules, and by 1916, the Broncos were matching up with teams like Stanford, USC, and Nevada, in addition to traditional arch-rivals San Francisco and St. Mary's. Santa Clara has long had a series of long-tenured coaches; since 1935, only seven different men have coached the Broncos.

The first long-tenured coach of Santa Clara was Harlan Dykes, who led the team to a 101–48 record. Much like the university football team, the Broncos played many home games in San Francisco, both at Kezar Pavilion and at the Civic Center.

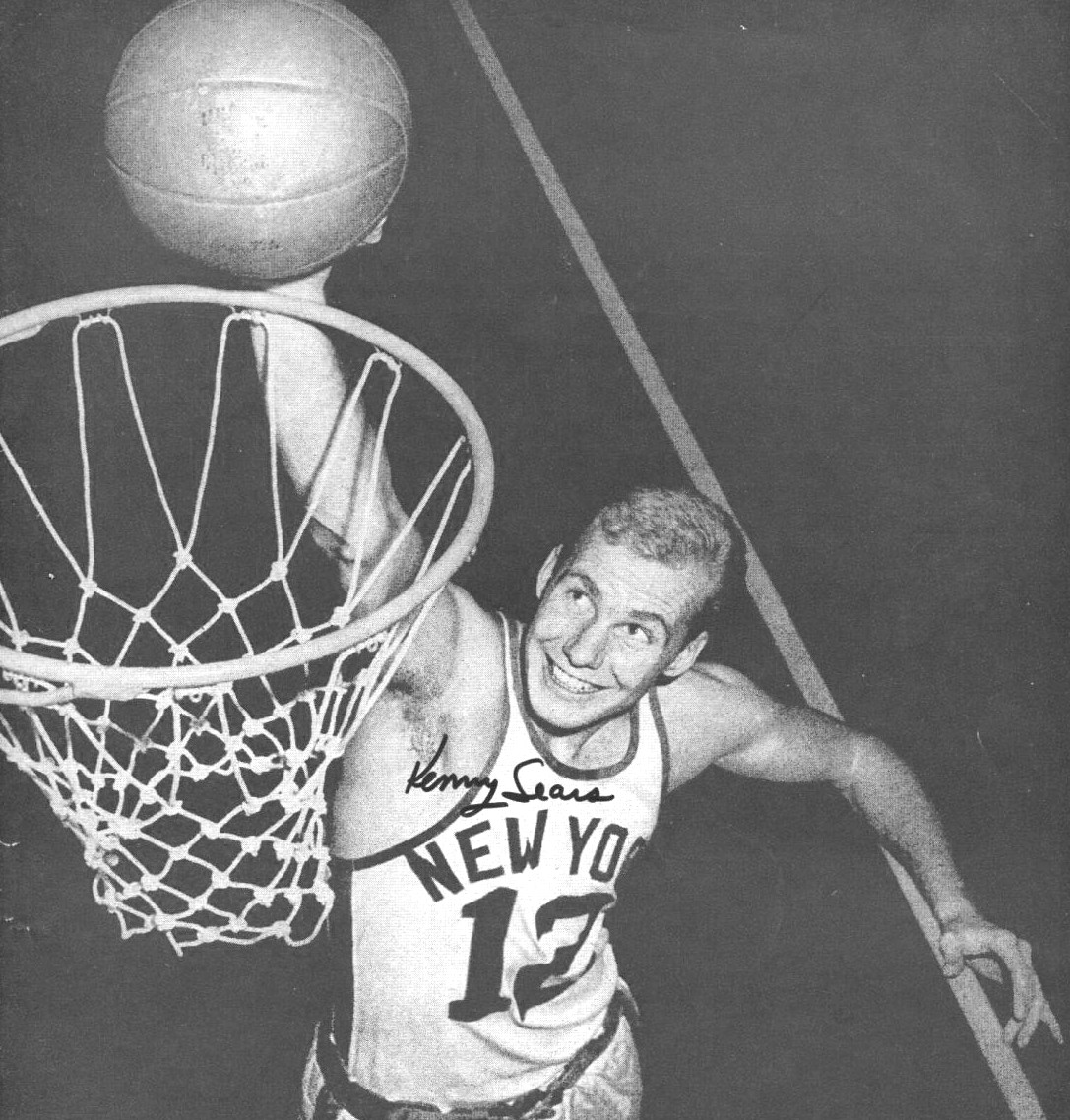
As a freshman, Ken Sears led the Broncos to the 1952 Final Four; he later played in the NBA, first for the New York Knicks

More sustained success for Santa Clara came under Head Coach George Barsi, whose tenure spanned from 1935 to 1945. Barsi was a graduate of Santa Clara in 1930. Barsi's "Magicians of the Maplewood" included future Warriors Head Coach Bob Feerick as well as Santa Clara's first All-American, Ralph "Toddy" Giannini. The Broncos dazzled crowds in excess of 20,000 at Madison Square Garden and defeated City College of New York and La Salle University by 20 points apiece during an exhibition match-up. Santa Clara was among the first teams to shoot one-handed or run the fast break.

Some of Santa Clara's earliest basketball stars, like Bruce Hale, Dick O'Keefe, and Stan Patrick, played in the NBL, the forerunner to the modern NBA.

Following the post-war period, former Santa Clara star Bob Feerick returned to coach the Broncos. Under his guidance, the Broncos advanced to the 1952 Final Four, as well as Elite Eight trips in 1953 and 1954. Santa Clara forward Ken Sears appeared on the cover of the new Sports Illustrated in December 1954, becoming the first basketball player, college or pro, to do so. After leading the Broncos back to the NCAA tournament in 1960, Feerick left Santa Clara in 1962 to coach the NBA's San Francisco Warriors, who had just relocated from Philadelphia.

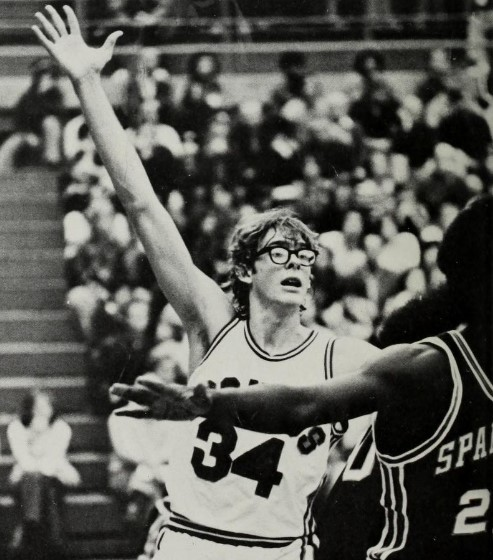
Four-year starter Kurt Rambis during the 1976–77 season.

Replacing Feerick was Dick Garibaldi, a member of the 1952 Final Four team, who led the Broncos for eight seasons and compiled an overall record of 137–77 (.640). His 1968 squad finished at 27–2, dropping only one regular season game, to local rival San Jose State. Led on the court by Bud Ogden and Dennis Awtrey, Santa Clara reached as high as second in the AP poll. The Broncos also appeared in the NCAA tournament in 1967 and 1969. In a three-year period, they compiled a 73–12 (.859) record.

Garibaldi resigned in the summer of 1970 to work for Converse shoes, and Carroll Williams became the longest tenured coach in Santa Clara's basketball history, leading the Broncos from 1970 to 1991. He led the team to a 344–274 (.557) record. Despite the sustained success, Williams took the Broncos to an NCAA tournament only once (1987); in addition, the team reached the NIT in 1984, 1985, and 1989. Williams' tenure produced two of Santa Clara's most memorable players, Kurt Rambis and Nick Vanos, the former remembered for his time with the Lakers and the latter remembered for his untimely death shortly after entering the NBA. Both players would have their numbers retired.

Dick Davey became the head coach in 1992, after serving as an assistant for many years. He experienced immediate success, thanks to a young Canadian point guard, Steve Nash, who led the Broncos to three NCAA tournaments in 1993, 1995, and 1996. In 1993, the fifteenth-seeded Broncos upset second-seeded (and #5) Arizona, becoming the second team to do so. Nash went on to become Santa Clara's most decorated player at the professional level, twice winning the NBA MVP award.

Following the 2006 season, Davey retired under controversial circumstances, as it appeared some boosters had pushed hard for his retirement. Davey compiled 251–190 (.569) overall record, and a 122–88 (.581) record in West Coast Conference play. He won three straight regular season WCC titles and one WCC tournament.

He was replaced by Kerry Keating, an assistant coach from UCLA. In nine seasons at the helm of the Broncos, Keating led the Broncos to both CBI and CIT championships, but was unable to take the Broncos to the NCAA tournament or finish better than 4th in the WCC. Keating's overall record as head coach was 139–159 (.466), with a 53–88 (.376) record in WCC play. Keating is the only coach to post a lifetime losing record in conference play with Santa Clara. On March 7, 2016, Keating was fired by Santa Clara.

Three weeks later, Santa Clara announced the hiring of Herb Sendek, whose head coaching experience included time at Miami University, NC State, and Arizona State. Sendek's resume includes trips to the NIT or NCAA tournament in 18 of his 22 seasons as a head coach.

Under Sendek, the Broncos have enjoyed a renaissance. In 2022, Santa Clara returned to the NIT for the first time since the 1980s, and saw Jalen Williams drafted 12th overall, the first Bronco selected in the NBA draft since Steve Nash. The following year, Brandin Podziemski was drafted 19th overall by the Golden State Warriors and the Broncos returned to the NIT. In 2025, the Broncos returned to the NIT for the third time in four years, and won their first NIT game since the 1980s.

In 2026, Santa Clara received an at-large bid to the NCAA Tournament, their first trip since 1996. Santa Clara fell in overtime after a half-court buzzer beater by Kentucky tied the game. Santa Clara forward Allen Graves was drafted 19th overall in the 2026 NBA Draft

== Rivalries ==
Santa Clara maintains a number of rivalries, most of which are almost a century old. Santa Clara's most heated rivals have traditionally been the other Bay Area WCC members, San Francisco and Saint Mary's. All WCC members are treated like rivals, as are all four in-state members of the Pac-12.

=== San Francisco Dons ===
Santa Clara and San Francisco first met in 1908, and have met 211 times since. Santa Clara has leads the series, 111–101. As two comparably sized Jesuit institutions within an hour’s drive of each other, the Broncos and Dons are natural rivals. The rivalry was heightened in the 1950s, with Santa Clara advancing to the Final Four in 1952, and San Francisco winning the tournament in 1955 and 1956. In a time when the NCAA tournament field was limited to 16 teams, the winner of the rivalry series was often the WCAC representative. The rivalry has remained competitive to the present day, however, it has lost some of its luster following San Francisco's self-imposed death penalty in 1981. Up to that point, the Dons had been one of college basketball's powerhouses, and the Broncos had played the role of foil. Santa Clara has won a majority of the match-up since the San Francisco program was revived in 1985.

=== San Jose State Spartans ===
San Jose State and Santa Clara first played in 1909, and Santa Clara leads the all-time series, 82–32. The rivalry between the two schools was formalized in 2002 as the Rivalry Series which compiled point totals in men's and women's soccer, men's and women's basketball, men's and women's golf, men's and women's cross-country, baseball, softball, and women's volleyball, tennis and water polo.

=== Saint Mary’s Gaels ===
Saint Mary's and Santa Clara first played in 1910, and Santa Clara leads the all-time series, 131–83. The rivalry between the two schools has been most intense in football, and was less competitive in basketball. However, with both schools dropping football and Saint Mary's recent rise to prominence in basketball have heightened the rivalry.

=== Pacific Tigers ===
Santa Clara and Pacific own the oldest intercollegiate basketball rivalry in California, with the series beginning in 1904. Santa Clara leads the all-time series 89–51. The rivalry was initially one of proximity, as Pacific was founded in Santa Clara and later moved to San Jose. When the basketball rivalry began, the schools were located a stone's throw from one another. When Pacific relocated to Stockton in 1923, the rival lessened somewhat. Pacific was a founding member, along with Santa Clara, of the WCAC conference in 1952. However, the rivalry took another hit when Pacific moved to the 1971 to join the Big West Conference. However, the teams remained fixtures on one another's schedules. With Pacific returning to the WCC in 2013, the rivalry will take-on renewed significance.

=== Stanford Cardinal ===
Stanford and Santa Clara first met in 1912, and Stanford leads the all-time series 51–25. Both universities are in Santa Clara County, and have long shared a rivalry on and off the court. Former Bronco head coach Dick Davy served as an assistant at Stanford from 2008 to 2012 following his retirement as head coach of Santa Clara in 2007. Santa Clara's Kevin Foster passed Stanford's Todd Lichti as the leading scorer in Bay Area college basketball history.

=== Gonzaga Bulldogs ===
A newer rivalry for the Broncos has been with the Gonzaga Bulldogs. The teams first met in 1946, but did not become regular competitors until Gonzaga joined the West Coast Conference in 1979. Gonzaga leads the all-time series 49–31. In 2007, Santa Clara became the first, and to date, one of only two WCC members to beat Gonzaga in the McCarthey Athletic Center. In 2012, the attendance at the Santa Clara-Gonzaga game was 4,907, a Leavey Center record. On January 18, 2025, Santa Clara set the all-time opponent scoring record in the McCarthey Athletic Center in a 103-99 win against Gonzaga.

== Postseason ==
=== NCAA tournament results ===
The Broncos have appeared in 12 NCAA Tournaments. Their combined record is 11–14.

The Broncos win over Arizona in 1993 was the second time in tournament history that a 15 seed has upset a 2 seed.

Year	Seed	Round	Opponent	Result
1952		Sweet Sixteen; Elite Eight; Final Four; National 3rd Place Game	UCLA; Wyoming; Kansas; Illinois	W 68–59; W 56–53; L 55–74; L 64–67
1953		First Round; Sweet Sixteen; Elite Eight	Hardin-Simmons; Wyoming; Washington	W 81–56; W 67–52; L 62–74
1954		First Round; Sweet Sixteen; Elite Eight	Texas Tech; Colorado State; USC	W 73–64; W 73–50; L 65–66 2OT
1960		Sweet Sixteen; Regional 3rd Place Game	California; Utah	L 49–69; L 81–89
1968		Sweet Sixteen; Elite Eight	New Mexico; UCLA	W 86–73; L 66–87
1969		Sweet Sixteen; Elite Eight	Weber State; UCLA	W 63–59 OT; L 52–90
1970		Sweet Sixteen; Regional 3rd Place Game	Utah State; Long Beach State	L 68–69; W 89–86
1987	15	First Round	(2) Iowa	L 76–99
1993	15	First Round; Second Round	(2) Arizona (7) Temple	W 64–61; L 57–68
1995	12	First Round	(5) Mississippi State	L 67–75
1996	10	First Round; Second Round	(7) Maryland (2) Kansas	W 91–79; L 51–76
2026	10	First Round	(7) Kentucky	L 84–89 OT

=== NIT results ===
The Broncos have appeared in seven National Invitation Tournaments. Their combined record is 3–6.

Year	Round	Opponent	Result
1984	First Round; Second Round; Quarterfinals	Oregon; Lamar; Louisiana-Lafayette	W 66–53; W 76–74; L 76–97
1985	First Round	Fresno State	L 76–79
1988	First Round	Oregon	L 65–81
1989	First Round	New Mexico	L 76–91
2022	First Round	Washington State	L 50–63
2023	First Round	Sam Houston	L 56–58
2025	First Round; Second round	UC Riverside; UAB	W 101–62; L 84–88

=== CBI results ===
The Broncos have appeared in one College Basketball Invitational. Their record is 5–1 and were the 2013 champions.

Year	Round	Opponent	Result
2013	First Round; Quarterfinals; Semifinals; Finals Game 1 Finals Game 2 Finals Game 3	Vermont; Purdue; Wright State; George Mason; George Mason; George Mason	W 77–67; W 86–83; W 81–69; W 81–73; L 66–73; W 80–77

=== CIT results ===
The Broncos have appeared in one CollegeInsider.com Tournament. Their record is 5–0 and were the 2011 champions.

Year	Round	Opponent	Result
2011	First Round; Second Round; Quarterfinals; Semifinals; Championship	Northern Arizona; Air Force; San Francisco; SMU; Iona	W 68–63; W 88–75; W 95–91; W 72–55; W 76–69

== Individual honors ==
=== All-Americans ===
- Ralph Giannini (1939–40)
- Bob Feerick (1941–42)
- Ken Sears (1954–55)
- Bud Ogden (1969–69)
- Dennis Awtrey (1969–70)
- Mike Stewart (1971–72)
- Steve Nash (1995–96)
- John Bryant (2008–09)

=== Conference Players of the Year ===
- Ken Sears (1953, 1955)
- Dennis Awtrey (1969, 1970)
- Mike Stewart (1972)
- Kurt Rambis (1980)
- Steve Nash (1995, 1996)
- Marlon Garnett (1997)
- Sean Denison (2007)
- John Bryant (2009)
- Brandin Podziemski (2023)

=== Retired numbers ===
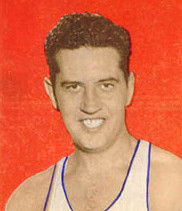
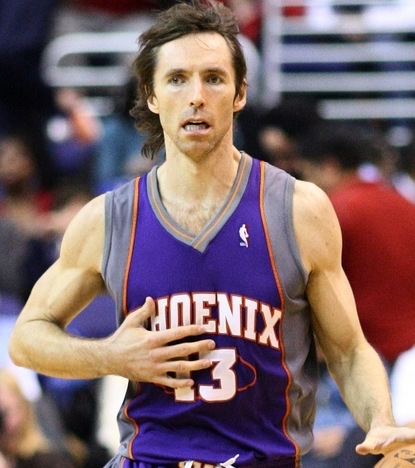
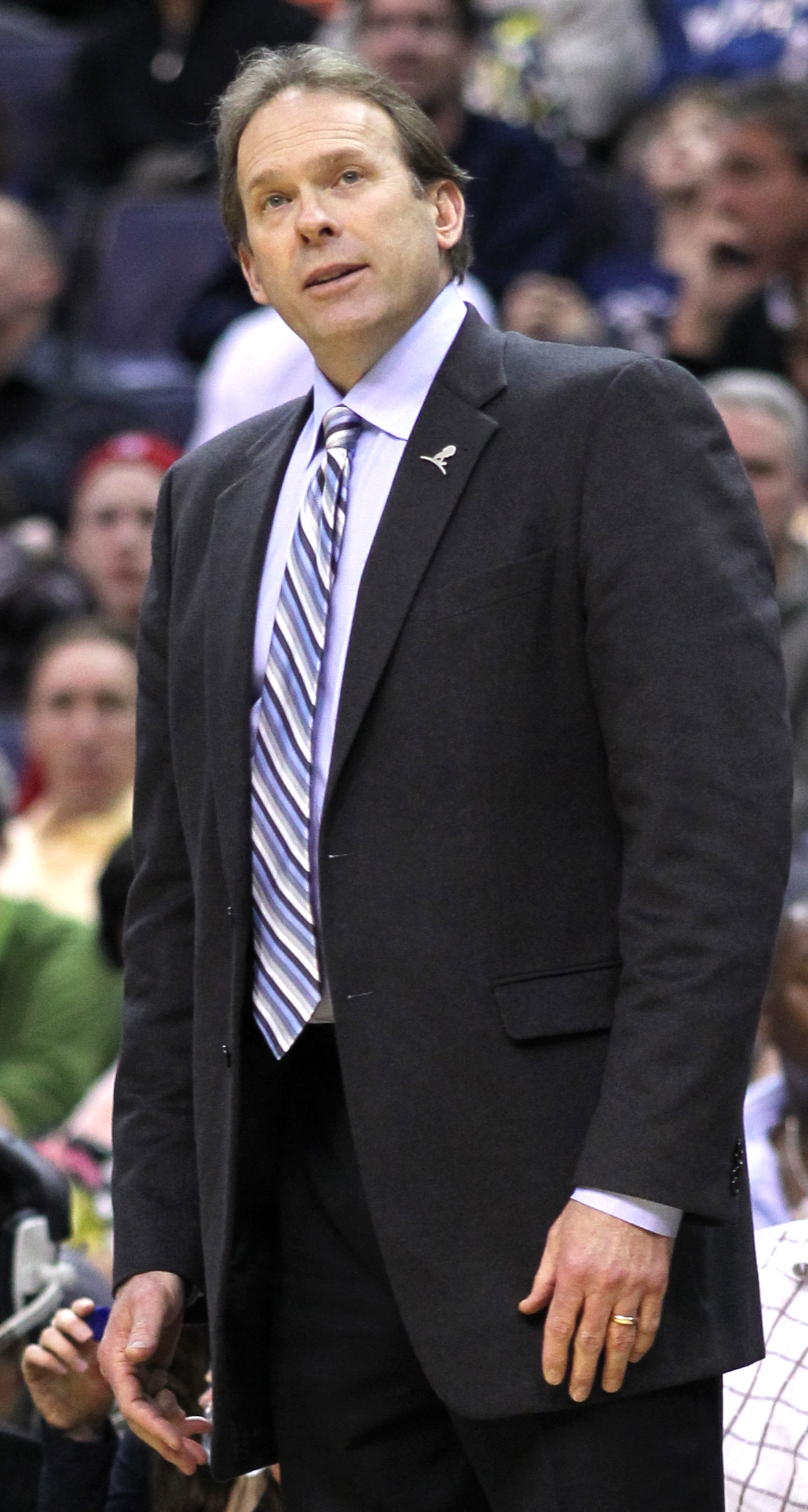
Ftlr: Bob Feerick, Steve Nash, and Kurt Rambis, some of the players who have their numbers retired by Santa Clara

Santa Clara Broncos retired numbers
No.	Player	Pos.	Career	No. ret.	Ref.
5	Bob Feerick	F/G	1938–41	2007	
11	Steve Nash	PG	1992–96	2006	
24	Jalen Williams	F/G	2019–22	2025	
32	Nick Vanos	C	1981–85	2007	
34	Kurt Rambis	PF	1976–80	2007	
34	Bud Ogden	SF	1966–69	2007	
53	Dennis Awtrey	C	1967–70	2007	
55	Ken Sears	PF/SF	1950–54	2007	

== Facilities ==
=== San Francisco Years ===
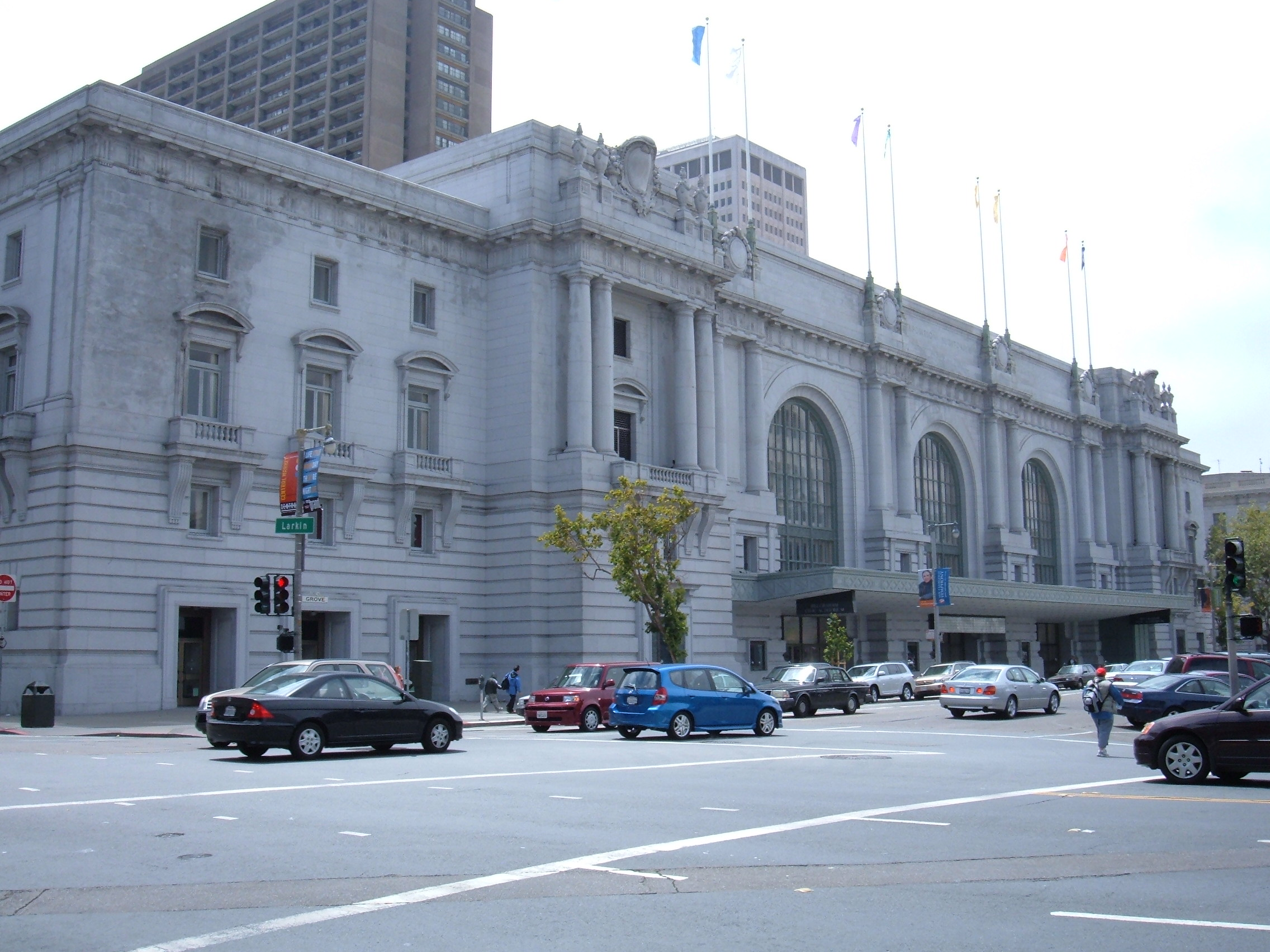
The San Francisco Civic Center was a frequent home for Santa Clara into the 1950s.

The earliest Santa Clara Bronco home games were played at the San Jose YMCA, located down the Alameda from the campus. By 1927, however, the Broncos had adopted Kezar Pavilion, about 50 miles north of campus in San Francisco, as their home arena. In 1932, the Broncos began splitting time between the San Francisco Civic Center and Kezar. Though it may seem strange in a modern context to play games so far from campus, before the post-war boom, the vast majority of the Bay Area's population lived in San Francisco, and with them, the majority of Santa Clara's alumni and fans. Santa Clara's campus was considered rural and isolated at the time. With the construction of the Seifert Gymnasium on campus in 1935, some less marquee match-ups were scheduled to be played on campus, much to the delight of the student body.

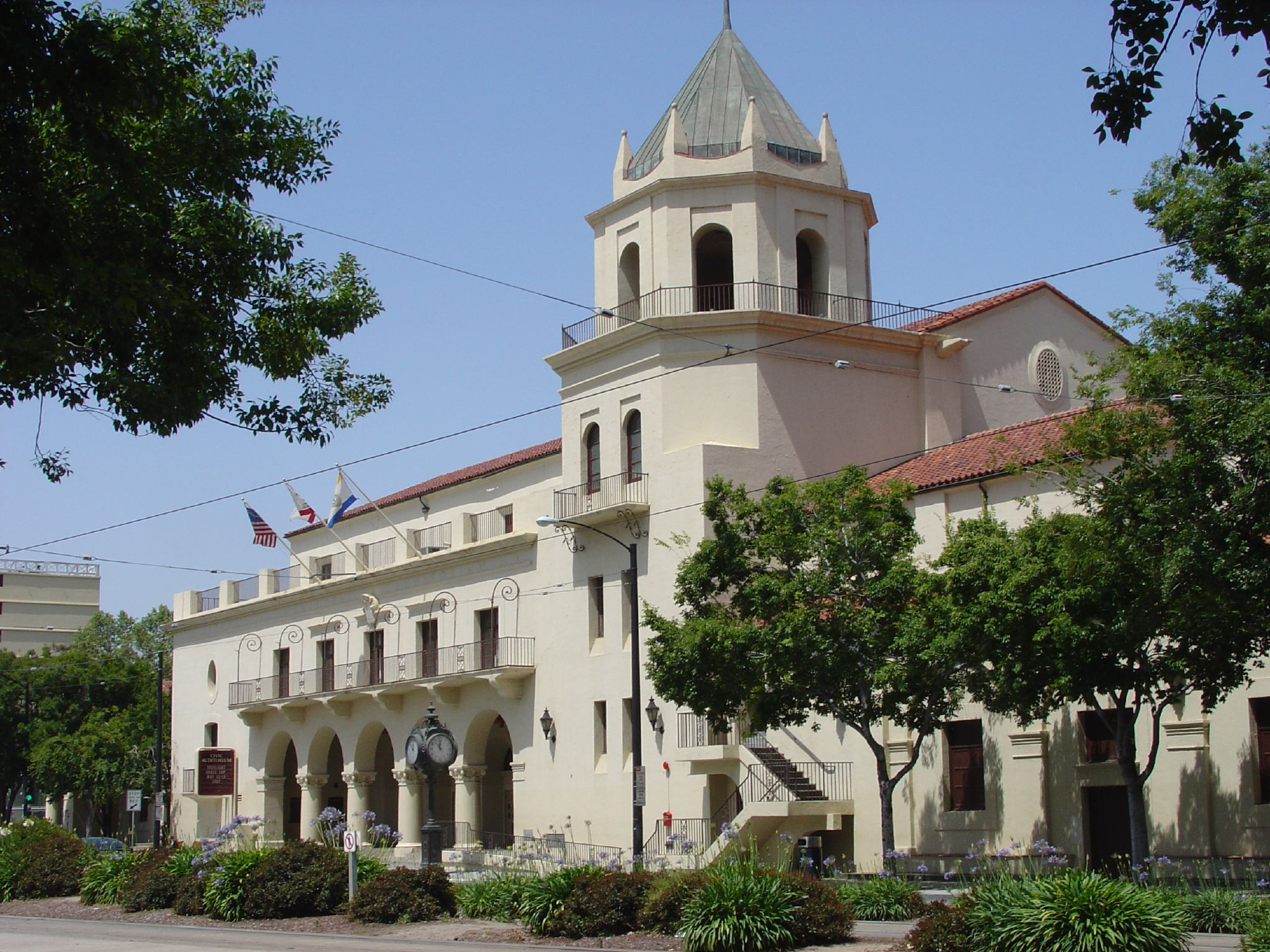
San Jose Civic Hosted the Broncos from 1935 until 1975.

=== San Jose Civic Auditorium ===
With its construction in 1935, San Jose finally had a building worthy of hosting intercollegiate basketball. Though the Broncos would still play 'home' games in San Francisco and Oakland intermittently until the late 1950s, San Jose Civic became Santa Clara's true home. The San Jose Civic Auditorium was designed for stage productions, giving the building a unique feeling during basketball games. Those sitting on the ground floor had an intimate view of the game, and opposing students were often seated on opposite sides of the balconies. During the Second World War, due to wartime travel restrictions, most home games were played at the smaller, on-campus, Seifert Gymnasium.

=== Toso Pavilion ===
Following Santa Clara's successful run in the late 1960s, boosters and fans clamored to move the team to a modern, spacious, on-campus home. The Civic Auditorium was small for major college basketball tenant, and scheduling was made difficult by sharing the space with both concerts and productions, as well as the rival San Jose State Spartants basketball team, who also called the venue home. With funds raised, Santa Clara began construction on Toso Pavilion in 1974. Once it was completed in 1975, the Broncos moved, for the first time, to an on-campus home with modern amenities. The facility featured an air supported vinyl fabric roof supported by 11 large fans constantly producing a higher air pressure inside the dome than outside, similar to the Pontiac Silverdome or BC Place Stadium. The inside of the facility featured the main activity floor, two recreation areas, and team locker rooms. The building was named for Hal Toso, a basketball player at Santa Clara in the 1920s, and a major donor, supporter, and member of the Santa Clara Athletic Hall of Fame.

=== Leavey Center ===
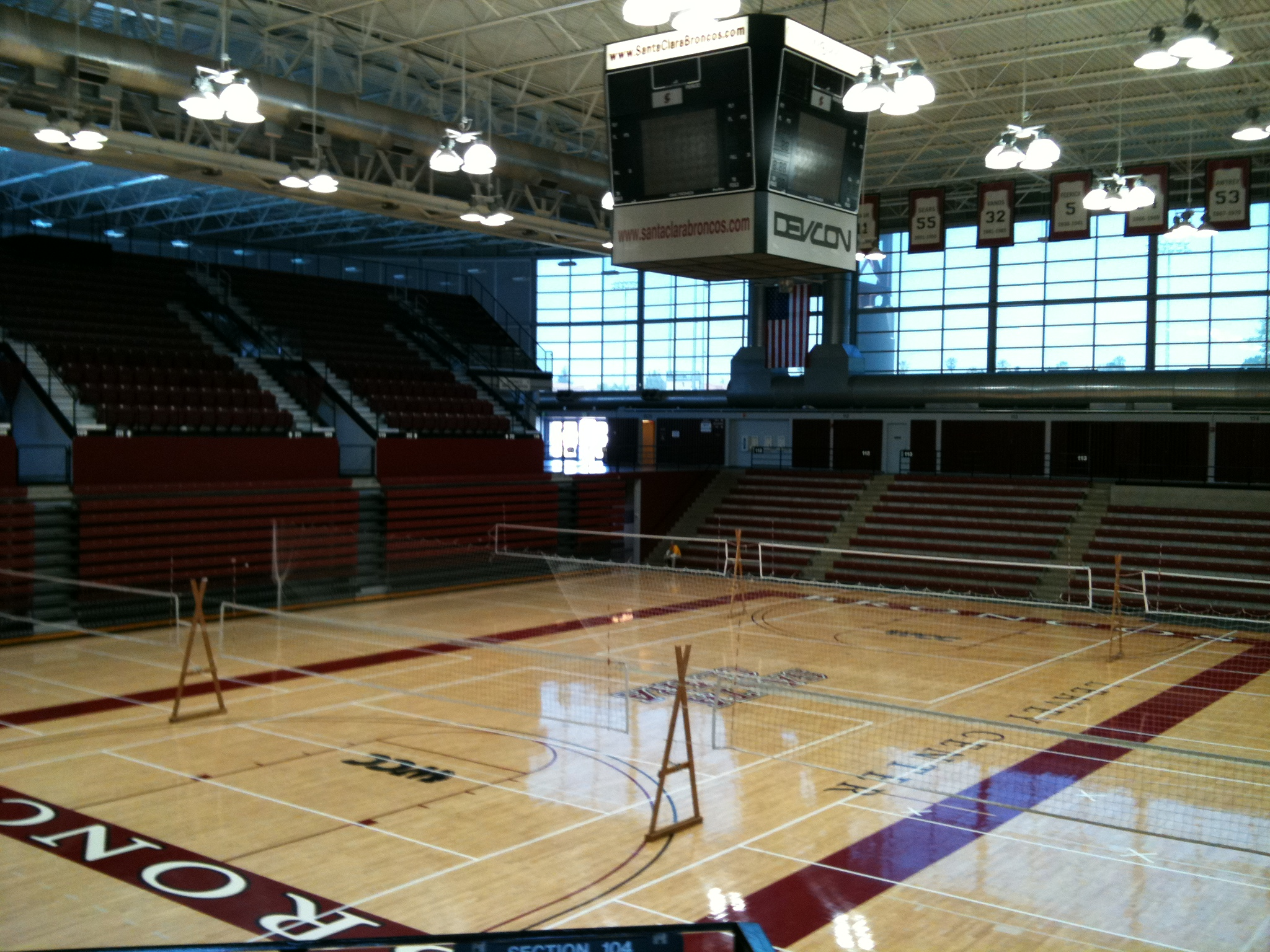
The Broncos' current home

The roof of Toso Pavilion developed several tears, and by 2000, the decision was made to renovate the building. A more permanent roof structure was built, and the interior of the building was renovated and brought to modern standards at a cost of $14 million. The newly christened Leavey Center was named for Thomas Leavey, a 1922 Santa Clara Alumnus who founded Farmers Insurance. The Leavey Center contains the whole of the Athletic Department, and locker rooms for all team, excluding baseball, are in the building. The Capacity was reduced from 5,000 seats to a listed capacity of 4,500 with the renovation, due to the addition of chairback seats. However, larger crowds have been known to watch the Broncos play, with 4,907 on hand to watch the Santa Clara–Gonzaga game in 2012. The Leavey Center has also played host to nine West Coast Conference Basketball championships, most recently in 2005.

== Other off campus venues ==
Santa Clara has been known to host games against some opponents at off-campus sites to accommodate larger crowds. In 2004, Santa Clara upset No. 3 North Carolina 77–66 at Oracle Arena. Santa Clara has also hosted Kansas, San Jose State, and others at the SAP Center, which is located on Santa Clara Street in downtown San Jose, only a few miles from campus.
