= List of Marquette Golden Eagles men's basketball seasons =

This is a list of seasons completed by the Marquette Golden Eagles men's college basketball team.

== Seasons ==
Statistics overview
Season	Coach	Overall	Conference	Standing	Postseason
Ralph Risch (Independent) (1916–1917)
1916–17	Ralph Risch	8–2			
John Ryan (Independent) (1917–1920)
1917–18	John Ryan	4–6			
1918–19		No Games			
1919–20	John Ryan	9–3			
Frank Murray (Independent) (1920–1929)
1920–21	Frank Murray	14–3			
1921–22	Frank Murray	15–5			
1922–23	Frank Murray	19–2			
1923–24	Frank Murray	10–10			
1924–25	Frank Murray	8–11			
1925–26	Frank Murray	8–13			
1926–27	Frank Murray	5–10			
1927–28	Frank Murray	7–11			
1928–29	Frank Murray	8–8			
Cord Lipe (Independent) (1929–1930)
1929–30	Cord Lipe	11–12			
Bill Chandler (Independent) (1930–1951)
1930–31	Bill Chandler	11–7			
1931–32	Bill Chandler	11–8			
1932–33	Bill Chandler	14–3			
1933–34	Bill Chandler	15–4			
1934–35	Bill Chandler	11–7			
1935–36	Bill Chandler	7–12			
1936–37	Bill Chandler	8–8			
1937–38	Bill Chandler	14–5			
1938–39	Bill Chandler	12–5			
1939–40	Bill Chandler	7–9			
1940–41	Bill Chandler	2–13			
1941–42	Bill Chandler	6–11			
1942–43	Bill Chandler	9–10			
1943–44	Bill Chandler	8–6			
1944–45	Bill Chandler	7–10			
1945–46	Bill Chandler	11–7			
1946–47	Bill Chandler	9–14			
1947–48	Bill Chandler	9–15			
1948–49	Bill Chandler	8–13			
1949–50	Bill Chandler	6–17			
1950–51	Bill Chandler	8–14			
Tex Winter (Independent) (1951–1953)
1951–52	Tex Winter	12–14			NCIT Champion
1952–53	Tex Winter	13–11			
Jack Nagle (Independent) (1953–1958)
1953–54	Jack Nagle	11–15			
1954–55	Jack Nagle	24–3			NCAA Elite Eight
1955–56	Jack Nagle	13–11			NIT first round
1956–57	Jack Nagle	10–15			
1957–58	Jack Nagle	11–11			
Eddie Hickey (Independent) (1958–1964)
1958–59	Eddie Hickey	23–6			NCAA University Division Sweet Sixteen
1959–60	Eddie Hickey	13–12			
1960–61	Eddie Hickey	16–11			NCAA University Division first round
1961–62	Eddie Hickey	15–11			
1962–63	Eddie Hickey	20–9			NIT Third Place
1963–64	Eddie Hickey	5–21			
Al McGuire (Independent) (1964–1977)
1964–65	Al McGuire	8–18			
1965–66	Al McGuire	14–12			
1966–67	Al McGuire	21–9			NIT Runner-up
1967–68	Al McGuire	23–6			NCAA University Division Sweet Sixteen
1968–69	Al McGuire	24–5			NCAA University Division Elite Eight
1969–70	Al McGuire	26–3			NIT Champion
1970–71	Al McGuire	28–1			NCAA University Division Sweet Sixteen
1971–72	Al McGuire	25–4			NCAA University Division Sweet Sixteen
1972–73	Al McGuire	25–4			NCAA University Division Sweet Sixteen
1973–74	Al McGuire	26–5			NCAA Division I Runner-up
1974–75	Al McGuire	23–4			NCAA Division I first round
1975–76	Al McGuire	27–2			NCAA Division I Elite Eight
1976–77	Al McGuire	25–7			NCAA Division I Champion
Hank Raymonds (Independent) (1977–1983)
1977–78	Hank Raymonds	24–4			NCAA Division I first round
1978–79	Hank Raymonds	22–7			NCAA Division I Sweet Sixteen
1979–80	Hank Raymonds	18–9			NCAA Division I first round
1980–81	Hank Raymonds	20–11			NIT first round
1981–82	Hank Raymonds	23–9			NCAA Division I second round
1982–83	Hank Raymonds	19–10			NCAA Division I first round
Rick Majerus (Independent) (1983–1986)
1983–84	Rick Majerus	17–13			NIT second round
1984–85	Rick Majerus	20–11			NIT Quarterfinal
1985–86	Rick Majerus	19–11			NIT second round
Bob Dukiet (Independent) (1986–1989)
1986–87	Bob Dukiet	16–13			NIT first round
1987–88	Bob Dukiet	10–18			
1988–89	Bob Dukiet	13–15			
Kevin O'Neill (Midwestern Collegiate Conference) (1989–1991)
1989–90	Kevin O'Neill	15–14	9–5	T–3rd	NIT first round
1990–91	Kevin O'Neill	11–18	7–7	T–5th	
Kevin O'Neill (Great Midwest Conference) (1991–1994)
1991–92	Kevin O'Neill	16–13	5–5	T–3rd	
1992–93	Kevin O'Neill	20–8	6–4	3rd	NCAA Division I first round
1993–94	Kevin O'Neill	24–9	10–2	1st	NCAA Division I Sweet Sixteen
Mike Deane (Great Midwest Conference) (1994–1995)
1994–95	Mike Deane	21–12	7–5	T–3rd	NIT Runner-up
Mike Deane (Conference USA) (1995–1999)
1995–96	Mike Deane	23–8	10–4	2nd (Blue)	NCAA Division I second round
1996–97	Mike Deane	22–9	9–5	2nd (Blue)	NCAA Division I first round
1997–98	Mike Deane	20–11	8–8	4th (American)	NIT Quarterfinal
1998–99	Mike Deane	14–15	6–10	6th (American)	
Tom Crean (Conference USA) (1999–2005)
1999–00	Tom Crean	15–14	8–8	4th (American)	NIT first round
2000–01	Tom Crean	15–14	9–7	3rd (American)	
2001–02	Tom Crean	26–7	13–3	2nd (American)	NCAA Division I first round
2002–03	Tom Crean	27–6	14–2	1st (American)	NCAA Division I Final Four
2003–04	Tom Crean	19–12	8–8	8th	NIT Quarterfinal
2004–05	Tom Crean	19–12	7–9	9th	NIT first round
Tom Crean (Big East Conference) (2005–2008)
2005–06	Tom Crean	20–11	10–6	T–4th	NCAA Division I first round
2006–07	Tom Crean	24–10	10–6	T–5th	NCAA Division I first round
2007–08	Tom Crean	25–10	11–7	T–5th	NCAA Division I second round
Buzz Williams (Big East Conference) (2008–2014)
2008–09	Buzz Williams	25–10	12–6	5th	NCAA Division I second round
2009–10	Buzz Williams	22–12	11–7	T–5th	NCAA Division I first round
2010–11	Buzz Williams	22–15	9–9	T–9th	NCAA Division I Sweet Sixteen
2011–12	Buzz Williams	27–8	14–4	2nd	NCAA Division I Sweet Sixteen
2012–13	Buzz Williams	26–9	14–4	T–1st	NCAA Division I Elite Eight
2013–14	Buzz Williams	17–15	9–9	6th	
Steve Wojciechowski (Big East Conference) (2014–2021)
2014–15	Steve Wojciechowski	13–19	4–14	T–9th	
2015–16	Steve Wojciechowski	20–13	8–10	7th	
2016–17	Steve Wojciechowski	19–13	10–8	T–3rd	NCAA Division I first round
2017–18	Steve Wojciechowski	21–14	9–9	T–6th	NIT Quarterfinal
2018–19	Steve Wojciechowski	24–10	12–6	2nd	NCAA Division I first round
2019–20	Steve Wojciechowski	18–12	8–10	T–6th	No postseason held
2020–21	Steve Wojciechowski	13–14	8–11	9th	
Shaka Smart (Big East Conference) (2021–present)
2021–22	Shaka Smart	19–13	11–8	T–5th	NCAA Division I first round
2022–23	Shaka Smart	29–7	17–3	1st	NCAA Division I second round
2023–24	Shaka Smart	27–10	14–6	T–2nd	NCAA Division I Sweet Sixteen
2024–25	Shaka Smart	23–11	13–7	T–4th	NCAA Division I first round
2025–26	Shaka Smart	12–20	7–13	T–7th	
Total:		1,722–1,074			
National champion Postseason invitational champion Conference regular season champion Conference regular season and conference tournament champion Division regular season champion Division regular season and conference tournament champion Conference tournament champion
