= List of Marquette Golden Eagles men's basketball head coaches =

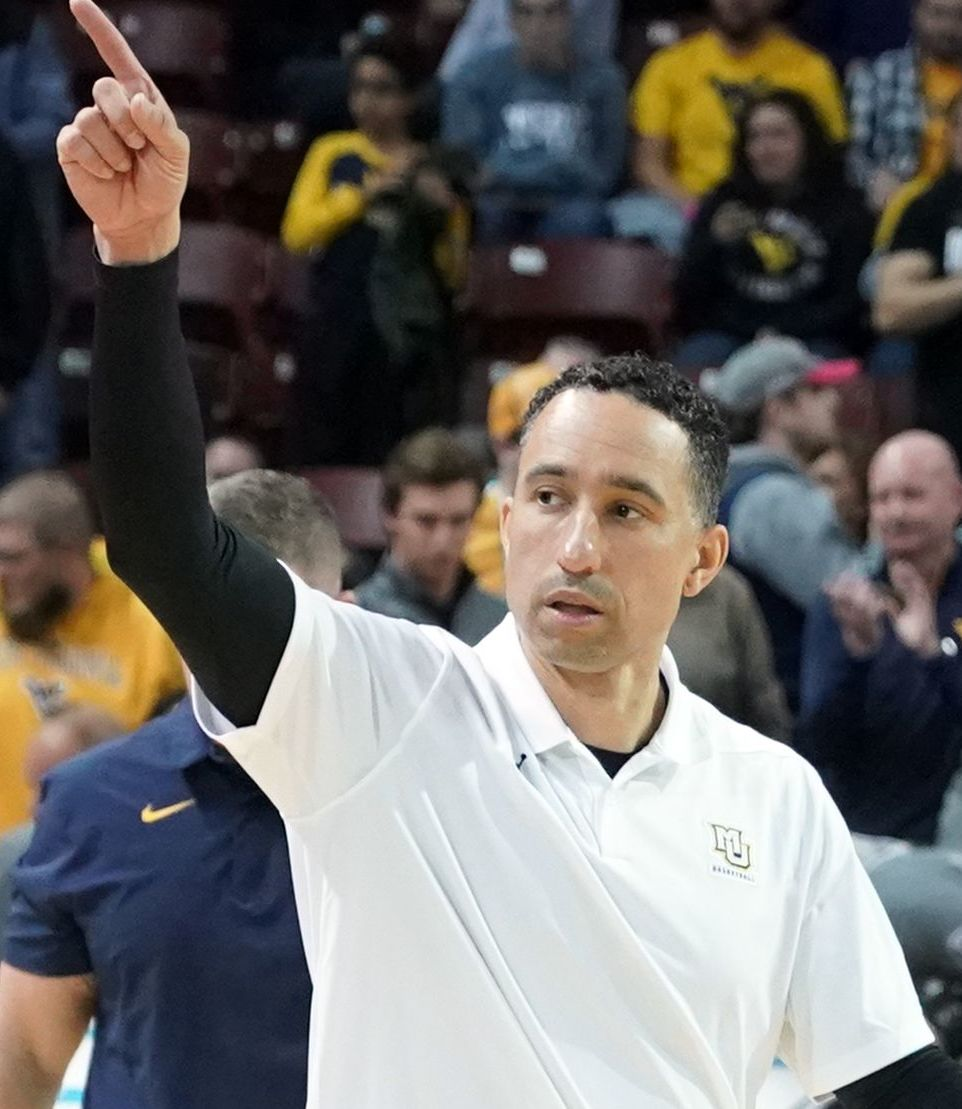
Shaka Smart, the current head coach of the Marquette Golden Eagles.

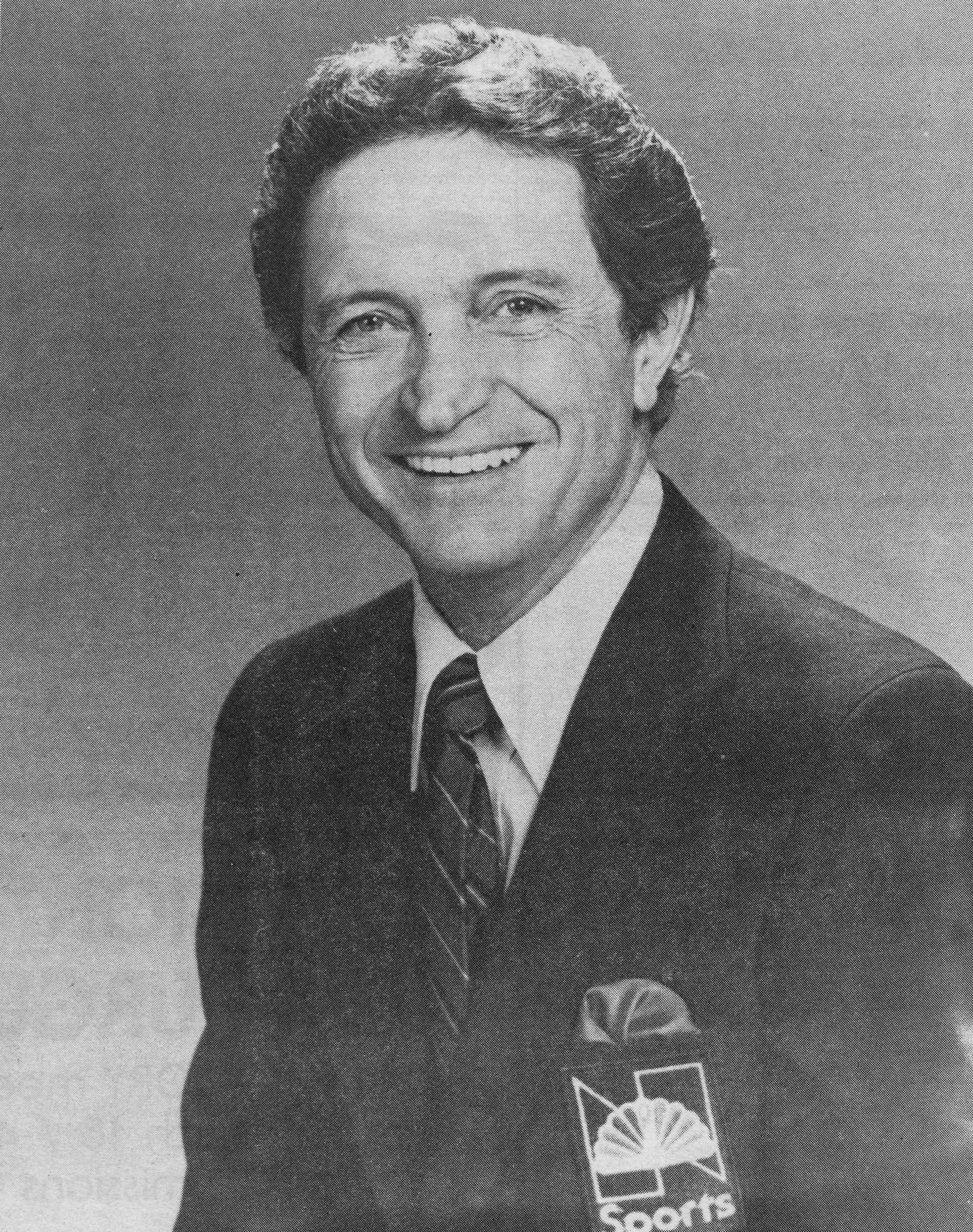
Al McGuire, the winningest head coach in Golden Eagles men's basketball history.

The following is a list of Marquette Golden Eagles men's basketball head coaches. There have been 18 head coaches of the Golden Eagles in their 106-season history.

Marquette's current head coach is Shaka Smart. He was hired as the Golden Eagles' head coach in March 2021, replacing Steve Wojciechowski, who was fired after the 2020–21 season.

No.	Tenure	Coach	Years	Record	Pct.
1	1916–1917	Ralph Risch	1	8–3	.727
2	1918–1920	John J. Ryan	2	13–9	.591
3	1920–1929	Frank Murray	9	94–73	.563
4	1929–1930	Cord Lipe	1	11–12	.478
5	1930–1951	Bill Chandler	21	193–198	.494
6	1951–1953	Tex Winter	2	25–25	.500
7	1953–1958	Jack Nagle	5	69–55	.556
8	1958–1964	Eddie Hickey	6	92–70	.568
9	1964–1977	Al McGuire	13	295–80	.787
10	1977–1983	Hank Raymonds	6	126–50	.716
11	1983–1986	Rick Majerus	3	56–35	.615
12	1986–1989	Bob Dukiet	3	39–46	.459
13	1989–1994	Kevin O'Neill	5	86–62	.581
14	1994–1999	Mike Deane	5	100–55	.645
15	1999–2008	Tom Crean	9	190–96	.664
16	2008–2014	Buzz Williams	6	139–69	.668
17	2014–2021	Steve Wojciechowski	7	128–95	.574
18	2021–present	Shaka Smart	4	98–41	.705
Totals		18 coaches	107 seasons	1,763–1,073	.622
Records updated through end of 2024–25 season Source
