= 1968–69 Notre Dame Fighting Irish men's basketball team =

American college basketball season

1968–69 Notre Dame Fighting Irish men's basketball

NCAA tournament, Regional first round, L 72–77 vs. Miami (OH)
- Conference: Independent

Ranking
- AP: No. 17
- Record: 20–7
- Head coach: John Dee (5th season)
- Home arena: Joyce Center

1968–69 NCAA University Division men's basketball independents standings
	Conf.				Overall
Team	W		L	PCT	W		L	PCT
No. 16 Boston College		–		–	24	–	4	.857
Rutgers		–		–	21	–	4	.840
No. 14 Marquette		–		–	24	–	5	.828
No. 12 New Mexico State		–		–	24	–	5	.828
No. 9 Duquesne		–		–	21	–	5	.808
No. 10 Villanova		–		–	21	–	5	.808
No. 8 St. John's		–		–	23	–	6	.793
Dayton		–		–	20	–	7	.741
No. 17 Notre Dame		–		–	20	–	7	.741
Seattle		–		–	20	–	8	.714
Colorado State		–		–	17	–	7	.708
Jacksonville		–		–	17	–	7	.708
St. Bonaventure		–		–	17	–	7	.708
Florida State		–		–	18	–	8	.692
West Texas State		–		–	18	–	8	.692
Holy Cross		–		–	16	–	8	.667
Oklahoma City		–		–	18	–	9	.667
Saint Francis (PA)		–		–	16	–	8	.667
Southern Illinois		–		–	16	–	8	.667
Fordham		–		–	17	–	9	.654
Army		–		–	18	–	10	.643
Texas Western		–		–	16	–	9	.640
Detroit		–		–	16	–	10	.615
Houston		–		–	16	–	10	.615
Penn State		–		–	13	–	9	.591
Boston University		–		–	14	–	10	.583
Miami (FL)		–		–	14	–	10	.583
Providence		–		–	14	–	10	.583
NYU		–		–	12	–	9	.571
DePaul		–		–	14	–	11	.560
Northern Illinois		–		–	13	–	11	.542
Virginia Tech		–		–	14	–	12	.538
Creighton		–		–	13	–	13	.500
Georgetown		–		–	12	–	12	.500
Hardin–Simmons		–		–	13	–	13	.500
Georgia Tech		–		–	12	–	13	.480
Tulane		–		–	12	–	14	.462
West Virginia		–		–	12	–	14	.462
Air Force		–		–	11	–	13	.458
Niagara		–		–	11	–	13	.458
Colgate		–		–	11	–	14	.440
Butler		–		–	11	–	15	.423
Loyola (IL)		–		–	9	–	14	.391
Fairfield		–		–	10	–	16	.385
Xavier		–		–	10	–	16	.385
Syracuse		–		–	9	–	16	.360
Utah State		–		–	9	–	17	.346
Centenary		–		–	9	–	18	.333
Navy		–		–	7	–	14	.333
Pan American		–		–	8	–	17	.320
Canisius		–		–	7	–	16	.304
St. Francis		–		–	7	–	16	.304
Loyola (LA)		–		–	5	–	19	.208
Pittsburgh		–		–	4	–	20	.167
Portland		–		–	3	–	23	.115
Denver		–		–	2	–	24	.077
Rankings from AP Poll

The 1968–69 Notre Dame Fighting Irish men's basketball team represented University of Notre Dame during the 1968–69 NCAA University Division men's basketball season.

== Roster ==
1968–69 Notre Dame Fighting Irish men's basketball team
Players
Coaches

Pos.	#	Name	Height	Weight	Year	Hometown
F	40	Bob Arnzen	6 ft 5 in (1.96 m)	205 lb (93 kg)	Sr	Fort Thomas, Kentucky
G	34	Austin Carr	6 ft 4 in (1.93 m)	200 lb (91 kg)	So	Washington, D.C.
F	43	Sid Catlett	6 ft 8 in (2.03 m)	230 lb (104 kg)	So	Washington, D.C.
G	31	Jim Derrig	6 ft 2 in (1.88 m)	180 lb (82 kg)	Sr	Villa Park, Illinois
F	45	John Gallagher	6 ft 5 in (1.96 m)	196 lb (89 kg)	Jr	Lynbrook, New York
F	41	Jim Hinga	6 ft 4 in (1.93 m)	200 lb (91 kg)	So	Muncie, Indiana
F	42	Collis Jones	6 ft 7 in (2.01 m)	200 lb (91 kg)	So	Washington, D.C.
G	35	Jack Meehan	6 ft 1 in (1.85 m)	181 lb (82 kg)	So	Philadelphia, Pennsylvania
G	33	Dwight Murphy	6 ft 3 in (1.91 m)	170 lb (77 kg)	Sr	Kansas City, Kansas
G	30	Michael O'Connell	6 ft 1 in (1.85 m)	180 lb (82 kg)	Jr	Cincinnati, Ohio
C	52	John Pleick	6 ft 8 in (2.03 m)	236 lb (107 kg)	So	El Segundo, California
F	44	Dan Quinn	6 ft 3 in (1.91 m)	184 lb (83 kg)	Sr	Northfield, Illinois
G	32	Thomas Sinnott	6 ft 4 in (1.93 m)	201 lb (91 kg)	So	Elizabeth, New Jersey
C	53	Bob Whitmore	6 ft 8 in (2.03 m)	195 lb (88 kg)	Sr	Washington, D.C.
C	55	Jay Ziznewski	6 ft 6 in (1.98 m)	250 lb (113 kg)	Jr	Perth Amboy, New Jersey

Head coach

- John Dee

Assistant coach(es)

- Gene Sullivan

Legend

- (C) Team captain
- (S) Suspended
- (I) Ineligible
- (W) Walk-on
- Injured
- Current redshirt

== Schedule ==
Date time, TV	Rank^{#}	Opponent^{#}	Result	Record	Site city, state
December 3		at King's College	W 84–54	1–0	Scandlon PE Center; Wilkes–Barre, Pennsylvania
December 7		UCLA	L 75–88	1–1	Joyce Center; South Bend, Indiana
December 11		Wisconsin	W 57–56	2–1	Joyce Center; South Bend, Indiana
December 14		at Saint Louis	W 101–76	3–1	St. Louis Arena; St. Louis, Missouri
December 16		Minnesota	W 65–64	4–1	Joyce Center; South Bend, Indiana
December 21		Indiana	W 104–94	5–1	Joyce Center; South Bend, Indiana
December 28		vs. Kentucky	L 90–110	5–2	Freedom Hall; Louisville, Kentucky
December 30		vs. American	W 92–67	6–2	Royal Farms Arena; Baltimore, Maryland
January 4		Saint Peter's	W 85–71	7–2	Joyce Center; South Bend, Indiana
January 6		Fordham	W 84–65	8–2	Joyce Center; South Bend, Indiana
January 9		Butler	W 76–73	9–2	Joyce Center; South Bend, Indiana
January 11		DePaul	W 66–60	10–2	Joyce Center; South Bend, Indiana
January 13		Air Force	W 88–53	11–2	Joyce Center; South Bend, Indiana
January 15		Detroit	W 84–77	12–2	Joyce Center; South Bend, Indiana
January 25		vs. Illinois	L 57–91	12–3	Chicago Stadium; Chicago, Illinois
January 30		Georgia Tech	W 71–52	13–3	Joyce Center; South Bend, Indiana
February 1		at Houston	L 82–89	13–4	Delmar Field House; Houston, Texas
February 5		at DePaul	W 85–73	14–4	Alumni Hall; Chicago, Illinois
February 8		at Detroit	W 79–72	15–4	Calihan Hall; Detroit, Michigan
February 11		Michigan State	L 59–71	15–5	Joyce Center; South Bend, Indiana
February 15		Utah State	W 108–82	16–5	Joyce Center; South Bend, Indiana
February 17		at Butler	W 94–90	17–5	Hinkle Fieldhouse; Indianapolis, Indiana
February 20		at NYU	W 98–88	18–5	Madison Square Garden; New York, New York
February 25		Valparaiso	W 89–72	19–5	Joyce Center; South Bend, Indiana
March 1		at St. John's (NY)	W 71–69 ^{OT}	20–5	Carnesecca Arena; Queens, NY
March 3		Creighton	L 74–79	20–6	Joyce Center; South Bend, Indiana
March 8		vs. Miami (OH); First Round	L 60–63	20–7	SIU Arena; Carbondale, Illinois
*Non-conference game. ^{#}Rankings from AP Poll. (#) Tournament seedings in parentheses.
