= 1917–18 Marquette Blue and Gold men's basketball team =

American college basketball season

1917–18 Marquette Golden Eagles men's basketball
- Conference: Independent
- Record: 4–6
- Head coach: John Ryan (1st season)
- Captain: J.C. Long

The 1917–18 Marquette Blue and Gold men's basketball team represented the Marquette University during the 1917–18 NCAA college men's basketball season. The head coach was John Ryan, coaching in his first season.

== Schedule ==
Date time, TV	Opponent	Result	Record	Site city, state
December 14	at Lawrence	L 13–25	1–0	Appleton, WI
December 19	at Wisconsin	L 14–15	0–2	Red Gym; Madison, WI
January 14	Carroll	W 44–11	1–2	Milwaukee, WI
January 19	Milwaukee YMCA	L 10–26	1–3	Milwaukee, WI
January 26	Lawrence	W 28–14	2–3	Milwaukee, WI
February 9	at Ripon	W 22–17	3–3	Ripon, WI
February 15	at Northwestern	L 12–24	3–4	Old Patten Gymnasium; Evanston, IL
February 16	at DePaul	L 17–21	3–5	Chicago, IL
February 22	DePaul	W 20–19	4–5	Milwaukee, WI
March 2	Ripon	L 10–20	4–6	Milwaukee, WI
*Non-conference game. (#) Tournament seedings in parentheses.

== Statistics ==
- Al Delmore 5.1 ppg
