= 1968–69 Georgetown Hoyas men's basketball team =

American college basketball season

1968–69 Georgetown Hoyas men's basketball
- Conference: Independent
- Record: 12–12
- Head coach: John Magee (3rd season)
- Assistant coaches: Bob Reese (3rd season); Jim Brown (1st season)
- Captain: Jim Supple
- Home arena: McDonough Gymnasium

1968–69 NCAA University Division men's basketball independents standings
	Conf.				Overall
Team	W		L	PCT	W		L	PCT
No. 16 Boston College		–		–	24	–	4	.857
Rutgers		–		–	21	–	4	.840
No. 14 Marquette		–		–	24	–	5	.828
No. 12 New Mexico State		–		–	24	–	5	.828
No. 9 Duquesne		–		–	21	–	5	.808
No. 10 Villanova		–		–	21	–	5	.808
No. 8 St. John's		–		–	23	–	6	.793
Dayton		–		–	20	–	7	.741
No. 17 Notre Dame		–		–	20	–	7	.741
Seattle		–		–	20	–	8	.714
Colorado State		–		–	17	–	7	.708
Jacksonville		–		–	17	–	7	.708
St. Bonaventure		–		–	17	–	7	.708
Florida State		–		–	18	–	8	.692
West Texas State		–		–	18	–	8	.692
Holy Cross		–		–	16	–	8	.667
Oklahoma City		–		–	18	–	9	.667
Saint Francis (PA)		–		–	16	–	8	.667
Southern Illinois		–		–	16	–	8	.667
Fordham		–		–	17	–	9	.654
Army		–		–	18	–	10	.643
Texas Western		–		–	16	–	9	.640
Detroit		–		–	16	–	10	.615
Houston		–		–	16	–	10	.615
Penn State		–		–	13	–	9	.591
Boston University		–		–	14	–	10	.583
Miami (FL)		–		–	14	–	10	.583
Providence		–		–	14	–	10	.583
NYU		–		–	12	–	9	.571
DePaul		–		–	14	–	11	.560
Northern Illinois		–		–	13	–	11	.542
Virginia Tech		–		–	14	–	12	.538
Creighton		–		–	13	–	13	.500
Georgetown		–		–	12	–	12	.500
Hardin–Simmons		–		–	13	–	13	.500
Georgia Tech		–		–	12	–	13	.480
Tulane		–		–	12	–	14	.462
West Virginia		–		–	12	–	14	.462
Air Force		–		–	11	–	13	.458
Niagara		–		–	11	–	13	.458
Colgate		–		–	11	–	14	.440
Butler		–		–	11	–	15	.423
Loyola (IL)		–		–	9	–	14	.391
Fairfield		–		–	10	–	16	.385
Xavier		–		–	10	–	16	.385
Syracuse		–		–	9	–	16	.360
Utah State		–		–	9	–	17	.346
Centenary		–		–	9	–	18	.333
Navy		–		–	7	–	14	.333
Pan American		–		–	8	–	17	.320
Canisius		–		–	7	–	16	.304
St. Francis		–		–	7	–	16	.304
Loyola (LA)		–		–	5	–	19	.208
Pittsburgh		–		–	4	–	20	.167
Portland		–		–	3	–	23	.115
Denver		–		–	2	–	24	.077
Rankings from AP Poll

The 1968–69 Georgetown Hoyas men's basketball team represented Georgetown University during the 1968–69 NCAA University Division college basketball season. John Magee coached them in his third season as head coach. The team was an independent and played its home games at McDonough Gymnasium on the Georgetown campus in Washington, D.C. The team finished the season with a record of 12–12 and had no post-season play.

== Season recap ==
Diminutive guard Don Weber joined the team this season after an impressive stint with the freshman team the previous year. He played a fast-break style of offense and scored in double figures four times, including a season-high 22 points against William & Mary.

Against Loyola in the first game of the season, junior center Charlie Adrion had 24 points and 19 rebounds. In the next game, he scored a career-high 40 points against American. Over the next three games after that – against Randolph–Macon, George Washington, and St. John's – he had a combined 91 points and 44 rebounds. Adrion led the team in scoring in nine of the season's first 10 games, each time scoring in double figures.

On February 13, 1969, Adrion scored only seven points against New York University, and against Rutgers two days later he suffered a season-ending knee injury. With Adrion out, senior forward and team captain Jim Supple, who scored in double figures in 18 of the 23 games he appeared in during the season, stepped up his scoring production: He averaged 20 points per game after Adrion's injury, led the team in scoring in six of the last seven games of the year, and finished the season averaging 16.5 points per game.

Despite Supple's efforts, the 1968-69 team continued a recent pattern of strong Georgetown starts followed by late-season collapses – the 1964–65 team lost seven of its final 10 games, while in 1966–67 the Hoyas lost eight of their final 11 games – that sank hopes for a berth in a post-season tournament. After going 10–5 in its first 15 games, it lost seven of its last nine to finish with a record of 12–12. During the three seasons from 1966–67 though this season, Georgetown had a combined record of 6–18 in the last eight games of the season, 1–13 on the road.

The 1968–69 team was not ranked in the Top 20 in the Associated Press Poll or Coaches' Poll at any time.

== Roster ==
#	Name	Height	Weight (lbs.)	Position	Class	Hometown	Previous Team(s)
10	Jerry Pyles	N/A	N/A	G	Jr.	Oxon Hill, MD, U.S.	Oxon Hill HS
12	Don Weber	5'8"	160	G	So.	Ridgewood, NJ, U.S.	Don Bosco Preparatory HS
14	Dick Zeitler	5'11"	N/A	G	So.	Seaford, NY, U.S.	Archbishop Molloy HS
20	Jim Higgins	6'1"	N/A	G	Jr.	Dumont, NJ, U.S.	Don Bosco Preparatory HS
22	Tim Mercier	5'10"	N/A	G	So.	Jersey City, NJ, U.S.	St. Peter's Preparatory School
24	Paul Favorite	6'8"	N/A	F	Jr.	Moorestown, NJ, U.S.	Saint Joseph's Preparatory School
30	Bernard White	6'1"	N/A	G	Sr.	Ann Arbor, MI, U.S.	George Mason University
32	Bob Hannan	6'3"	N/A	F	So.	Paterson, NJ, U.S.	St. Mary HS
34	Mike Laska	5'11"	N/A	G	Jr.	Worcester, MA, U.S.	Assumption Preparatory School
40	Ed MacNamara	N/A	N/A	F	So.	Dumont, NJ, U.S.	Bergen Catholic HS
44	Bill McGarrity	N/A	N/A	F	So.	Rosemont, PA, U.S.	Saint Joseph's Preparatory School
52	Jim Supple	6'4"	185	F	Sr.	Summit, NJ, U.S.	St. Peter's Preparatory School
54	Charlie Adrion	6'8"	225	C	Jr.	Hillsdale, NJ, U.S.	Don Bosco Preparatory HS

== 1968–69 schedule and results ==
Date time, TV	Rank^{#}	Opponent^{#}	Result	Record	Site city, state
Regular Season
Sat., Nov. 30, 1968 no, no		at Loyola Maryland	W 94–74	1-0	Alumni Gymnasium; Baltimore, MD
Mon., Dec. 2, 1968 no, no		at American	W 85–76	2-0	Fort Myer Gymnasium; Fort Myer, VA
Sat., Dec. 7, 1968 no, no		Randolph–Macon	W 79–71	3-0	McDonough Gymnasium; Washington, DC
Tue., Dec. 11, 1968 no, no		George Washington	L 73–74 ^{OT}	3-1	McDonough Gymnasium; Washington, DC
Sat., Dec. 14, 1968 no, no		at St. John's	L 61–74	3-2	Alumni Hall; Queens, NY
Tue., Dec. 17, 1968 no, no		Navy	W 70–55	4-2	McDonough Gymnasium; Washington, DC
Fri., Dec. 20, 1968 no, no		Manhattan	W 63–57	5-2	McDonough Gymnasium; Washington, DC
Sat., Dec. 21, 1968 no, no		Seton Hall	W 69–57	6-2	McDonough Gymnasium; Washington, DC
Sat., Jan. 4, 1969 no, no		at Penn State	L 50–52 ^{OT}	6-3	Recreation Hall; State College, PA
Thu., Jan. 9, 1969 no, no		at Holy Cross	L 67–73	6-4	Worcester Memorial Auditorium; Worcester, MA
Tue., Jan. 14, 1969 no, no		at Columbia	L 62–103	6-5	Alumni Gymnasium; New York, NY
Sun., Jan. 19, 1969 no, no		Fordham	W 59–58	7-5	McDonough Gymnasium; Washington, DC
Thu., Jan. 30, 1969 no, no		at Fairleigh Dickinson	W 62–60	8-5	Campus Gymnasium; Rutherford, NJ
Sat., Feb. 1, 1969 no, no		at Fairfield	W 76–72	9-5	New Haven Arena; New Haven, CT
Thu., Feb. 6, 1969 no, no		at Catholic	W 62–59	10-5	Brookland Gymnasium; Washington, DC
Sat., Feb. 8, 1969 no, no		vs. William & Mary	L 84–90 ^{2OT}	10-6	Fort Eustis Gymnasium; Newport News, VA
Mon., Feb. 10, 1969 no, no		Xavier	W 77–63	11-6	McDonough Gymnasium; Washington, DC
Thu., Feb. 13, 1969 no, no		at New York University	L 67–87	11-7	Madison Square Garden; New York, NY
Sat., Feb. 15, 1969 no, no		at Rutgers	L 72–85	11-8	College Avenue Gymnasium; New Brunswick, NJ
Tue., Feb. 18, 1969 no, no		Boston College	L 66–72 ^{OT}	11-9	McDonough Gymnasium; Washington, DC
Thu., Feb. 20, 1969 no, no		Saint Anselm	W 57–56	12-9	McDonough Gymnasium; Washington, DC
Sat., Feb. 22, 1969 no, no		at George Washington	L 74–112	12-10	Fort Myer Gymnasium; Fort Myer, VA
Tue., Feb. 25, 1969 no, no		St. Joseph's	L 45–54	12-11	McDonough Gymnasium; Washington, DC
Sat., Mar. 1, 1969 no, no		Maryland	L 78–83	12-12	McDonough Gymnasium; Washington, DC
*Non-conference game. ^{#}Rankings from AP Poll. (#) Tournament seedings in parentheses.
