= 1968–69 Dayton Flyers men's basketball team =

American college basketball season

1968–69 Dayton Flyers men's basketball

NCAA Men's Division I Tournament, First Round
- Conference: Independent
- Record: 20–7
- Head coach: Don Donoher
- Home arena: Thomas J. Frericks Center

1968–69 NCAA University Division men's basketball independents standings
	Conf.				Overall
Team	W		L	PCT	W		L	PCT
No. 16 Boston College		–		–	24	–	4	.857
Rutgers		–		–	21	–	4	.840
No. 14 Marquette		–		–	24	–	5	.828
No. 12 New Mexico State		–		–	24	–	5	.828
No. 9 Duquesne		–		–	21	–	5	.808
No. 10 Villanova		–		–	21	–	5	.808
No. 8 St. John's		–		–	23	–	6	.793
Dayton		–		–	20	–	7	.741
No. 17 Notre Dame		–		–	20	–	7	.741
Seattle		–		–	20	–	8	.714
Colorado State		–		–	17	–	7	.708
Jacksonville		–		–	17	–	7	.708
St. Bonaventure		–		–	17	–	7	.708
Florida State		–		–	18	–	8	.692
West Texas State		–		–	18	–	8	.692
Holy Cross		–		–	16	–	8	.667
Oklahoma City		–		–	18	–	9	.667
Saint Francis (PA)		–		–	16	–	8	.667
Southern Illinois		–		–	16	–	8	.667
Fordham		–		–	17	–	9	.654
Army		–		–	18	–	10	.643
Texas Western		–		–	16	–	9	.640
Detroit		–		–	16	–	10	.615
Houston		–		–	16	–	10	.615
Penn State		–		–	13	–	9	.591
Boston University		–		–	14	–	10	.583
Miami (FL)		–		–	14	–	10	.583
Providence		–		–	14	–	10	.583
NYU		–		–	12	–	9	.571
DePaul		–		–	14	–	11	.560
Northern Illinois		–		–	13	–	11	.542
Virginia Tech		–		–	14	–	12	.538
Creighton		–		–	13	–	13	.500
Georgetown		–		–	12	–	12	.500
Hardin–Simmons		–		–	13	–	13	.500
Georgia Tech		–		–	12	–	13	.480
Tulane		–		–	12	–	14	.462
West Virginia		–		–	12	–	14	.462
Air Force		–		–	11	–	13	.458
Niagara		–		–	11	–	13	.458
Colgate		–		–	11	–	14	.440
Butler		–		–	11	–	15	.423
Loyola (IL)		–		–	9	–	14	.391
Fairfield		–		–	10	–	16	.385
Xavier		–		–	10	–	16	.385
Syracuse		–		–	9	–	16	.360
Utah State		–		–	9	–	17	.346
Centenary		–		–	9	–	18	.333
Navy		–		–	7	–	14	.333
Pan American		–		–	8	–	17	.320
Canisius		–		–	7	–	16	.304
St. Francis		–		–	7	–	16	.304
Loyola (LA)		–		–	5	–	19	.208
Pittsburgh		–		–	4	–	20	.167
Portland		–		–	3	–	23	.115
Denver		–		–	2	–	24	.077
Rankings from AP Poll

The 1968–69 Dayton Flyers men's basketball team represented the University of Dayton during the 1968–69 NCAA Division I season. The team competed as an independent program and finished the regular season with a 20–7 record.

The Flyers received an at-large invitation to the NCAA tournament where they were placed in the Midwest bracket against Colorado State. The Flyers were eliminated in the Round of 25, 50–52 by the Rams.

== Previous season ==
The Flyers entered the 1967-68 season ranked #6 in both the AP and UPI Coaches polls, but faltered in early play. The Flyers finished the 1967–68 regular season 17–9, missing the NCAA tournament. The team received a bid to the NIT where Dayton defeated Kansas in the championship, 61–48, to secure their second NIT championship.

== Roster ==
1968–69 Dayton Flyers men's basketball team
Players
Coaches

Pos.	#	Name	Height	Weight	Year	Previous school	Hometown
F	10	Steve Turnwald	6 ft 0 in (1.83 m)	—	So	Ottoville	Ottoville, Ohio
F	12	Ken May	6 ft 5 in (1.96 m)	210 lb (95 kg)	So	Belmont	Dayton, Ohio
G	13	Jim Gottschall	6 ft 2 in (1.88 m)	—	Jr	Chaminade	Dayton, Ohio
F	15	Tom Crosswhite	6 ft 7 in (2.01 m)	—	So	Dennison St Mary	Columbus, Ohio
G	24	Jerry Gottschall	6 ft 2 in (1.88 m)	—	Jr	Chaminade	Dayton, Ohio
C	31	Dan Obrovac	6 ft 10 in (2.08 m)	—	Sr	Canton Central Catholic	Canton, Ohio
F	32	Jack Keehan	6 ft 7 in (2.01 m)	—	So	Serra	Arlington Heights, Illinois
F	33	Dan Sadlier	6 ft 6 in (1.98 m)	—	Sr	Lima Central Catholic	Lima, Ohio
F	35	George Janky	6 ft 8 in (2.03 m)	—	Jr	St Rita	Chicago, Illinois
G	52	George Schloemer	6 ft 4 in (1.93 m)	—	So	Covington Catholic	Covington, Kentucky
F		Don Bernard	6 ft 7 in (2.01 m)	—	So	Beavercreek	Dayton, Ohio
G		Nick Ferri	6 ft 2 in (1.88 m)	—	So	Detroit Central Catholic	Detroit, Michigan
G		Tom Heckman	6 ft 1 in (1.85 m)	—	Sr	Ottawa-Glandorf	Glandorf, Ohio
G		Mike Leffel	6 ft 0 in (1.83 m)	—	Jr	Piqua	Piqua, Ohio
F		Ned Sharpenter	6 ft 7 in (2.01 m)	—	Sr	Marion Military Academy	Aurora, Illinois

Head coach

- Don Donoher

Assistant coach(es)

- Chuck Grigsby
- Bill Cassidy
- Pat Haley

Legend

- (C) Team captain
- (S) Suspended
- (I) Ineligible
- (W) Walk-on
- Injured
- Current redshirt

== Schedule ==
Date time, TV	Rank^{#}	Opponent^{#}	Result	Record	Site city, state
November 30		Baldwin-Wallace	W 89–59	1–0	Thomas J. Frericks Center; Dayton, Ohio
December 4		Gannon	W 91–71	2–0	Thomas J. Frericks Center; Dayton, Ohio
December 7		Bowling Green State	W 81–60	3–0	Thomas J. Frericks Center; Dayton, Ohio
December 9		Portland	W 95–66	4–0	Thomas J. Frericks Center; Dayton, Ohio
December 11		at Miami (OH)	W 83–55	5–0	Millett Hall; Oxford, Ohio
December 14		at Louisville	L 69–84	5–1	Freedom Hall; Louisville, Kentucky
December 21		Providence	W 90–63	6–1	Thomas J. Frericks Center; Dayton, Ohio
December 23		Loyola Marymount	W 83–58	7–1	Thomas J. Frericks Center; Dayton, Ohio
December 28		Eastern Kentucky	W 85–76	8–1	Thomas J. Frericks Center; Dayton, Ohio
December 31		at St. Louis	W 67–56	9–1	St. Louis Arena; St. Louis, Missouri
January 4		at Xavier	L 55–59	9–2	Schmidt Fieldhouse; Cincinnati, Ohio
January 11		at Detroit	W 64–62	10–2	Calihan Hall; Detroit, Michigan
January 15		Louisville	W 69–67	11–2	Thomas J. Frericks Center; Dayton, Ohio
January 18		at DePaul	W 86–83	12–2	Alumni Hall
January 20		Western Kentucky	L 65–70	12–3	Thomas J. Frericks Center; Dayton, Ohio
January 25		Miami (OH)	W 67–54	13–3	Thomas J. Frericks Center; Dayton, Ohio
January 27		Xavier	W 72–64	14–3	Thomas J. Frericks Center; Dayton, Ohio
February 1		Niagara	W 100–70	15–3	Thomas J. Frericks Center; Dayton, Ohio
February 6	No. 19	vs. Davidson	L 63–64	15–4	Madison Square Garden; New York, New York
February 8		at Loyola (IL)	W 70–69	16–4	Alumni Gym
February 13		at Rice	W 58–55	17–4	Tudor Fieldhouse; Houston, Texas
February 15		at Florida State	L 71–79	17–5	Tully Gymnasium
February 19		at Cincinnati	L 60–96	17–6	Armory Fieldhouse; Cincinnati, Ohio
February 22		Chattanooga	W 61–58	18–6	Thomas J. Frericks Center; Dayton, Ohio
February 26		Morehead State	W 75–63	19–6	Thomas J. Frericks Center; Dayton, Ohio
March 1		DePaul	W 63–57	20–6	Thomas J. Frericks Center; Dayton, Ohio
NCAA Tournament
March 8		vs. Colorado State; First round	L 50–52	20–7	Daniel-Meyer Coliseum; Fort Worth, Texas
*Non-conference game. ^{#}Rankings from AP Poll. (#) Tournament seedings in parentheses.
