= 1968–69 Penn State Nittany Lions basketball team =

American college basketball season

1968–69 Penn State Nittany Lions men's basketball
- Conference: Independent
- Record: 13–9
- Head coach: Johnny Bach (1st season)
- Home arena: Rec Hall

1968–69 NCAA University Division men's basketball independents standings
	Conf.				Overall
Team	W		L	PCT	W		L	PCT
No. 16 Boston College		–		–	24	–	4	.857
Rutgers		–		–	21	–	4	.840
No. 14 Marquette		–		–	24	–	5	.828
No. 12 New Mexico State		–		–	24	–	5	.828
No. 9 Duquesne		–		–	21	–	5	.808
No. 10 Villanova		–		–	21	–	5	.808
No. 8 St. John's		–		–	23	–	6	.793
Dayton		–		–	20	–	7	.741
No. 17 Notre Dame		–		–	20	–	7	.741
Seattle		–		–	20	–	8	.714
Colorado State		–		–	17	–	7	.708
Jacksonville		–		–	17	–	7	.708
St. Bonaventure		–		–	17	–	7	.708
Florida State		–		–	18	–	8	.692
West Texas State		–		–	18	–	8	.692
Holy Cross		–		–	16	–	8	.667
Oklahoma City		–		–	18	–	9	.667
Saint Francis (PA)		–		–	16	–	8	.667
Southern Illinois		–		–	16	–	8	.667
Fordham		–		–	17	–	9	.654
Army		–		–	18	–	10	.643
Texas Western		–		–	16	–	9	.640
Detroit		–		–	16	–	10	.615
Houston		–		–	16	–	10	.615
Penn State		–		–	13	–	9	.591
Boston University		–		–	14	–	10	.583
Miami (FL)		–		–	14	–	10	.583
Providence		–		–	14	–	10	.583
NYU		–		–	12	–	9	.571
DePaul		–		–	14	–	11	.560
Northern Illinois		–		–	13	–	11	.542
Virginia Tech		–		–	14	–	12	.538
Creighton		–		–	13	–	13	.500
Georgetown		–		–	12	–	12	.500
Hardin–Simmons		–		–	13	–	13	.500
Georgia Tech		–		–	12	–	13	.480
Tulane		–		–	12	–	14	.462
West Virginia		–		–	12	–	14	.462
Air Force		–		–	11	–	13	.458
Niagara		–		–	11	–	13	.458
Colgate		–		–	11	–	14	.440
Butler		–		–	11	–	15	.423
Loyola (IL)		–		–	9	–	14	.391
Fairfield		–		–	10	–	16	.385
Xavier		–		–	10	–	16	.385
Syracuse		–		–	9	–	16	.360
Utah State		–		–	9	–	17	.346
Centenary		–		–	9	–	18	.333
Navy		–		–	7	–	14	.333
Pan American		–		–	8	–	17	.320
Canisius		–		–	7	–	16	.304
St. Francis		–		–	7	–	16	.304
Loyola (LA)		–		–	5	–	19	.208
Pittsburgh		–		–	4	–	20	.167
Portland		–		–	3	–	23	.115
Denver		–		–	2	–	24	.077
Rankings from AP Poll

The 1968–69 Penn State Nittany Lions men's basketball team represented the Pennsylvania State University during the 1968–69 NCAA University Division men's basketball season. The team was led by 1st-year head coach Johnny Bach, and played their home games at Rec Hall in University Park, Pennsylvania.

== Roster ==
1968–69 Penn State Nittany Lions men's basketball team
Players
Coaches

Pos.	#	Name	Height	Weight	Year	Hometown
F	13	Willie Bryant	6 ft 3 in (1.91 m)	200 lb (91 kg)	So	Uniontown, Pennsylvania
G		Tom Daley	6 ft 2 in (1.88 m)	175 lb (79 kg)	Jr	Lock Haven, Pennsylvania
F		Mike Egleston	6 ft 4 in (1.93 m)	190 lb (86 kg)	Jr	Elkland, Pennsylvania
F		Galen Godbey	6 ft 5 in (1.96 m)	220 lb (100 kg)	Jr	State College, Pennsylvania
G		Gregg Hamilton	6 ft 0 in (1.83 m)	180 lb (82 kg)	Jr	North East, Pennsylvania
G		Ron Hornyak	5 ft 10 in (1.78 m)	165 lb (75 kg)	Sr	Erie, Pennsylvania
G		Jim Linden	6 ft 2 in (1.88 m)	165 lb (75 kg)	Sr	York, Pennsylvania
G	11	Bruce Mello	6 ft 3 in (1.91 m)	180 lb (82 kg)	So	East Rockaway, New York
F		Chip Morton	6 ft 5 in (1.96 m)	200 lb (91 kg)	So	Huntington, New York
C		Paul Nichols	6 ft 9 in (2.06 m)	190 lb (86 kg)	Jr	Philadelphia, Pennsylvania
F		Jeff Schweitzer	6 ft 5 in (1.96 m)	190 lb (86 kg)	Jr	Harborcreek, Pennsylvania
C		Bill Stansfield	6 ft 8 in (2.03 m)	230 lb (104 kg)	Sr	North Palm Beach, Florida
F		Bill Young	6 ft 6 in (1.98 m)	220 lb (100 kg)	Sr	Angelica, New York

Head coach

- Johnny Bach

Assistant coach(es)

Legend

- (C) Team captain
- (S) Suspended
- (I) Ineligible
- (W) Walk-on
- Injured
- Current redshirt

== Schedule ==
Date time, TV	Rank^{#}	Opponent^{#}	Result	Record	Site city, state
November 30		at Maryland	L 56–66	0–1	Cole Field House; College Park, Maryland
December 14		at Kent State	W 63–49	1–1	Memorial Athletic and Convocation Center; Kent, Ohio
December 16		at Buffalo	L 60–66 ^{OT}	1–2	Clark Memorial Gymnasium; Buffalo, NY
December 18		at Syracuse	L 51–71	1–3	Mandy Field house Syracuse, NY
December 20		at Bucknell	W 79–60	2–3	Davis Gym; Lewisburg, Pennsylvania
December 27		at La Salle	L 55–70	2–4	Philadelphia, Pennsylvania
December 28		vs. Niagara	W 77–74	3–4	Philadelphia, Pennsylvania
December 29		vs. DePaul	L 63–83	3–5	Philadelphia, Pennsylvania
January 4		Georgetown	W 52–50	4–5	Rec Hall; University Park, Pennsylvania
January 8		at Gettysburg	W 67–56	5–5	Bream Gymnasium
January 15		Carnegie-Mellon	W 82–55	6–5	Rec Hall; University Park, Pennsylvania
January 18		Pittsburgh	W 65–50	7–5	Rec Hall; University Park, Pennsylvania
January 22		West Virginia	W 64–62	8–5	Rec Hall; University Park, Pennsylvania
January 25		Army	L 54–64	8–6	Rec Hall; University Park, Pennsylvania
January 29		Syracuse	W 64–58	9–6	Rec Hall; University Park, Pennsylvania
February 1		Bucknell	W 68–66	10–6	Rec Hall; University Park, Pennsylvania
February 8		Navy	W 61–57	11–6	Rec Hall; University Park, Pennsylvania
February 12		at Temple	L 50–70	11–7	Convention Hall; Philadelphia, Pennsylvania
February 15		Boston College	L 63–67	11–8	Rec Hall; University Park, Pennsylvania
February 19		at West Virginia	W 81–67	12–8	Stansbury Hall; Morgantown, WV
February 22		at Pittsburgh	W 57–49	13–8	Fitzgerald Fieldhouse; Pittsburgh, Pennsylvania
March 1		Rutgers	L 57–59	13–9	Rec Hall; University Park, Pennsylvania
*Non-conference game. ^{#}Rankings from AP Poll. (#) Tournament seedings in parentheses.
