= 1968–69 St. Francis Terriers men's basketball team =

American college basketball season

1968–69 St. Francis Terriers men's basketball
- Conference: Independent
- Record: 7–16
- Head coach: Daniel Lynch (21st season)
- Home arena: 69th Regiment Armory

1968–69 NCAA University Division men's basketball independents standings
	Conf.				Overall
Team	W		L	PCT	W		L	PCT
No. 16 Boston College		–		–	24	–	4	.857
Rutgers		–		–	21	–	4	.840
No. 14 Marquette		–		–	24	–	5	.828
No. 12 New Mexico State		–		–	24	–	5	.828
No. 9 Duquesne		–		–	21	–	5	.808
No. 10 Villanova		–		–	21	–	5	.808
No. 8 St. John's		–		–	23	–	6	.793
Dayton		–		–	20	–	7	.741
No. 17 Notre Dame		–		–	20	–	7	.741
Seattle		–		–	20	–	8	.714
Colorado State		–		–	17	–	7	.708
Jacksonville		–		–	17	–	7	.708
St. Bonaventure		–		–	17	–	7	.708
Florida State		–		–	18	–	8	.692
West Texas State		–		–	18	–	8	.692
Holy Cross		–		–	16	–	8	.667
Oklahoma City		–		–	18	–	9	.667
Saint Francis (PA)		–		–	16	–	8	.667
Southern Illinois		–		–	16	–	8	.667
Fordham		–		–	17	–	9	.654
Army		–		–	18	–	10	.643
Texas Western		–		–	16	–	9	.640
Detroit		–		–	16	–	10	.615
Houston		–		–	16	–	10	.615
Penn State		–		–	13	–	9	.591
Boston University		–		–	14	–	10	.583
Miami (FL)		–		–	14	–	10	.583
Providence		–		–	14	–	10	.583
NYU		–		–	12	–	9	.571
DePaul		–		–	14	–	11	.560
Northern Illinois		–		–	13	–	11	.542
Virginia Tech		–		–	14	–	12	.538
Creighton		–		–	13	–	13	.500
Georgetown		–		–	12	–	12	.500
Hardin–Simmons		–		–	13	–	13	.500
Georgia Tech		–		–	12	–	13	.480
Tulane		–		–	12	–	14	.462
West Virginia		–		–	12	–	14	.462
Air Force		–		–	11	–	13	.458
Niagara		–		–	11	–	13	.458
Colgate		–		–	11	–	14	.440
Butler		–		–	11	–	15	.423
Loyola (IL)		–		–	9	–	14	.391
Fairfield		–		–	10	–	16	.385
Xavier		–		–	10	–	16	.385
Syracuse		–		–	9	–	16	.360
Utah State		–		–	9	–	17	.346
Centenary		–		–	9	–	18	.333
Navy		–		–	7	–	14	.333
Pan American		–		–	8	–	17	.320
Canisius		–		–	7	–	16	.304
St. Francis		–		–	7	–	16	.304
Loyola (LA)		–		–	5	–	19	.208
Pittsburgh		–		–	4	–	20	.167
Portland		–		–	3	–	23	.115
Denver		–		–	2	–	24	.077
Rankings from AP Poll

The 1968–69 St. Francis Terriers men's basketball team represented St. Francis College during the 1968–69 NCAA University Division men's basketball season. The team was coached by Daniel Lynch, who was in his twenty-first year at the helm of the St. Francis Terriers. The Terriers played their homes games at the 69th Regiment Armory and played as an Independent, not affiliated with a conference.

The Terriers finished the season at 7–16 overall. After the season, Daniel Lynch retired as the men's basketball head coach and continued to be the St. Francis College Athletics Director.

== Roster ==
1968–69 St. Francis Brooklyn Terriers men's basketball team
Players
Coaches

Pos.	#	Name	Height	Weight	Year	Hometown
F		John McMahon	6 ft 2 in (1.88 m)	—	Sr
C		Ed Grant	6 ft 4 in (1.93 m)	—	Sr
F		Bob Christie	6 ft 3 in (1.91 m)	—	Sr
G		John Conforti	6 ft 0 in (1.83 m)	—	Jr
F		Jim Sullivan	6 ft 3 in (1.91 m)	—	Jr
F		Frank Jones	6 ft 2 in (1.88 m)	—	Jr
G		Daniel Lynch, Jr	5 ft 9 in (1.75 m)	—	Jr
C		Dan Gallagher	6 ft 6 in (1.98 m)	—	Jr
G		Lou Dottrina	5 ft 10 in (1.78 m)	—	So
C		Earl Roberts	6 ft 7 in (2.01 m)	—	So
F		Paul Rube	6 ft 3 in (1.91 m)	—	So
F		Tom Raleigh	6 ft 3 in (1.91 m)	—	So

Head coach

- Daniel Lynch (St. Francis '38)

Assistant coach(es)

Legend

- (C) Team captain
- (S) Suspended
- (I) Ineligible
- (W) Walk-on
- Injured
- Current redshirt

== Schedule and results ==
Date time, TV	Opponent	Result	Record	Site city, state
Regular Season
December 1, 1968*	Pace	W 91–79	1–0	Bishop Ford High School; Brooklyn, NY
December 7, 1968*	Providence	L 54–93	1–1	69th Regiment Armory; New York, NY
December 11, 1968*	Seton Hall	L 53–66	1–2	69th Regiment Armory; New York, NY
December 16, 1968*	Hunter	W 94–45	2–2	69th Regiment Armory; New York, NY
December 17, 1968*	at Army	L 33–64	2–3	Gillis Field House; West Point, NY
December 21, 1968*	at Adelphi	W 87–79	3–3	Garden City, NY
December 30, 1968*	Manhattan	L 64–87	–	69th Regiment Armory; New York, NY
January 8, 1969*	King's	W 116–109 ^{3OT}	–	
January 11, 1969*	at St. Bonaventure	L 65–88	–	Reilly Center; Olean, NY
January 22, 1969*	Manhattan	L 56–96	–	69th Regiment Armory; New York, NY
January 25, 1969*	at No. 6 St. John's	L 55–71	–	Alumni Gymnasium (3,887); Jamaica, NY
February 1, 1969*	at Fordham	L 61–65	–	Rose Hill Gymnasium; Bronx, NY
February 5, 1969*	Siena	W 86–81	–	69th Regiment Armory; New York, NY
February 12, 1969*	at Saint Peter's	L 59–90	–	Jersey City Armory (2,374); Jersey City, NJ
February 15, 1969*	LIU	L 60–63	–	69th Regiment Armory; New York, NY
February 21, 1969*	at C.C.N.Y.	W 62–59	–	Wingate Gymnasium; New York, NY
February 22, 1969*	at Iona	L 51–69	–	Joseph E. O'Connell Memorial Gymnasium; New Rochelle, NY
February 26, 1969*	at Fairleigh Dickinson	L 82–91	–	Rutherford, NJ
*Non-conference game. ^{#}Rankings from AP Poll. (#) Tournament seedings in parentheses. All times are in Eastern Time.

== Awards ==
At the end of the season John Conforti was selected to the All-Metropolitan Team by the Metropolitan Basketball Writers Association.
