= 1968–69 Marquette Warriors men's basketball team =

American college basketball season

1968–69 Marquette Warriors men's basketball

NCAA Men's Division I Tournament, Elite Eight
- Conference: Independent

Ranking
- Coaches: No. 14
- AP: No. 14
- Record: 24–5
- Head coach: Al McGuire
- Home arena: Milwaukee Arena

1968–69 NCAA University Division men's basketball independents standings
	Conf.				Overall
Team	W		L	PCT	W		L	PCT
No. 16 Boston College		–		–	24	–	4	.857
Rutgers		–		–	21	–	4	.840
No. 14 Marquette		–		–	24	–	5	.828
No. 12 New Mexico State		–		–	24	–	5	.828
No. 9 Duquesne		–		–	21	–	5	.808
No. 10 Villanova		–		–	21	–	5	.808
No. 8 St. John's		–		–	23	–	6	.793
Dayton		–		–	20	–	7	.741
No. 17 Notre Dame		–		–	20	–	7	.741
Seattle		–		–	20	–	8	.714
Colorado State		–		–	17	–	7	.708
Jacksonville		–		–	17	–	7	.708
St. Bonaventure		–		–	17	–	7	.708
Florida State		–		–	18	–	8	.692
West Texas State		–		–	18	–	8	.692
Holy Cross		–		–	16	–	8	.667
Oklahoma City		–		–	18	–	9	.667
Saint Francis (PA)		–		–	16	–	8	.667
Southern Illinois		–		–	16	–	8	.667
Fordham		–		–	17	–	9	.654
Army		–		–	18	–	10	.643
Texas Western		–		–	16	–	9	.640
Detroit		–		–	16	–	10	.615
Houston		–		–	16	–	10	.615
Penn State		–		–	13	–	9	.591
Boston University		–		–	14	–	10	.583
Miami (FL)		–		–	14	–	10	.583
Providence		–		–	14	–	10	.583
NYU		–		–	12	–	9	.571
DePaul		–		–	14	–	11	.560
Northern Illinois		–		–	13	–	11	.542
Virginia Tech		–		–	14	–	12	.538
Creighton		–		–	13	–	13	.500
Georgetown		–		–	12	–	12	.500
Hardin–Simmons		–		–	13	–	13	.500
Georgia Tech		–		–	12	–	13	.480
Tulane		–		–	12	–	14	.462
West Virginia		–		–	12	–	14	.462
Air Force		–		–	11	–	13	.458
Niagara		–		–	11	–	13	.458
Colgate		–		–	11	–	14	.440
Butler		–		–	11	–	15	.423
Loyola (IL)		–		–	9	–	14	.391
Fairfield		–		–	10	–	16	.385
Xavier		–		–	10	–	16	.385
Syracuse		–		–	9	–	16	.360
Utah State		–		–	9	–	17	.346
Centenary		–		–	9	–	18	.333
Navy		–		–	7	–	14	.333
Pan American		–		–	8	–	17	.320
Canisius		–		–	7	–	16	.304
St. Francis		–		–	7	–	16	.304
Loyola (LA)		–		–	5	–	19	.208
Pittsburgh		–		–	4	–	20	.167
Portland		–		–	3	–	23	.115
Denver		–		–	2	–	24	.077
Rankings from AP Poll

The 1968–69 Marquette Warriors men's basketball team represented Marquette University during the 1968–69 NCAA University Division men's basketball season.

== Roster ==
1968–69 Marquette Warriors men's basketball team
Players
Coaches

Pos.	#	Name	Height	Weight	Year	Hometown
F	54	Bob Black	6 ft 4 in (1.93 m)	205 lb (93 kg)	So	Corning, Georgia
F	31	Gary Brell	6 ft 6 in (1.98 m)	190 lb (86 kg)	So	Milwaukee, Wisconsin
G	12	Jack Burke	6 ft 1 in (1.85 m)	180 lb (82 kg)	Jr	Ford, New Jersey
C	51	Ric Cobb	6 ft 5 in (1.96 m)	200 lb (91 kg)	Jr	Brooklyn, New York
F	30	Mike Curron	6 ft 4 in (1.93 m)	200 lb (91 kg)	Sr	Antigo, Wisconsin
F	42	Hugh McMahon	6 ft 6 in (1.98 m)	205 lb (93 kg)	So	Brooklyn, New York
G	14	Dean Meminger	6 ft 0 in (1.83 m)	175 lb (79 kg)	So	New York
G	45	Ron Rahn	6 ft 5 in (1.96 m)	200 lb (91 kg)	Jr	Milwaukee, Wisconsin
G	31	John Reider	5 ft 10 in (1.78 m)	160 lb (73 kg)	Jr	Kimberly, Wisconsin
G	15	Jeff Sewell	6 ft 3 in (1.91 m)	175 lb (79 kg)	Jr	Grafton, Wisconsin
F	21	Tom Sonnenberg	6 ft 4 in (1.93 m)	180 lb (82 kg)	So	Milwaukee, Wisconsin
F	50	Joe Thomas	6 ft 6 in (1.98 m)	205 lb (93 kg)	Jr	Canton, Georgia
G	24	George Thompson	6 ft 2 in (1.88 m)	200 lb (91 kg)	Sr	Brooklyn, New York

Head coach

- Al McGuire

Assistant coach(es)

- Tom Flynn
- Hank Raymonds

Legend

- (C) Team captain
- (S) Suspended
- (I) Ineligible
- (W) Walk-on
- Injured
- Current redshirt

== Schedule ==
Date time, TV	Rank^{#}	Opponent^{#}	Result	Record	Site city, state
December 2		St. John's (MN)	W 68–45	1–0	Milwaukee Arena; Milwaukee, WI
December 3		at Minnesota	L 73–75	1–1	Williams Arena; Minneapolis, MN
December 7		Portland	W 75–53	2–1	Milwaukee Arena; Milwaukee, WI
December 9		at Drake	L 63–68	2–2	Veterans Memorial Auditorium; Des Moines, Iowa
December 11		Valparaiso	W 103–66	3–2	Milwaukee Arena; Milwaukee, WI
December 14		Denver	W 81–70	4–2	Milwaukee Arena; Milwaukee, WI
December 21		Western Michigan	W 76–60	5–2	Milwaukee Arena; Milwaukee, WI
December 27		Army	W 62–42	6–2	Milwaukee Arena; Milwaukee, WI
December 28		Wisconsin	W 59–56	7–2	Milwaukee Arena; Milwaukee, WI
January 4		Detroit	W 85–71	8–2	Milwaukee Arena; Milwaukee, WI
January 7		Loyola (IL)	W 61–56	9–2	Milwaukee Arena; Milwaukee, WI
January 9		at DePaul	W 77–72	10–2	Alumni Hall
January 11		Xavier	W 82–69	11–2	Milwaukee Arena; Milwaukee, WI
January 14		UW Milwaukee	W 118–60	12–2	Milwaukee Arena; Milwaukee, WI
January 24		at Loyola (IL)	W 65–64	13–2	Alumni Gym
January 28		at Wisconsin	L 50–56	13–3	Wisconsin Field House; Madison, Wisconsin
February 1		at Detroit	W 75–74	14–3	Calihan Hall
February 4		Northern Michigan	W 84–59	15–3	Milwaukee Arena; Milwaukee, WI
February 8		Eastern Michigan	W 82–58	16–3	Milwaukee Arena; Milwaukee, WI
February 13		at St. Bonaventure	L 62–84	16–4	Reilly Center; St. Bonaventure, NY
February 15		DePaul	W 77–72	17–4	Milwaukee Arena; Milwaukee, WI
February 18		at Xavier	W 67–54	18–4	Cincinnati Gardens; Cincinnati, Ohio
February 20		at Denver	W 65–61	19–4	DU Fieldhouse; Denver, Colorado
February 26		Tulane	W 85–72	20–4	Milwaukee Arena; Milwaukee, WI
March 1		at Creighton	W 79–76	21–4	Omaha Civic Auditorium; Omaha, Nebraska
March 3		at Air Force	W 69–57	21–4	Clune Arena; Air Force Academy, Colorado
March 8		vs. Murray State; Second round	W 82–62	22–4	SIU Arena; Carbondale, Illinois
March 13		vs. No. 7 Kentucky; Sweet Sixteen	W 81–74	23–4	Wisconsin Field House; Madison, Wisconsin
March 13		vs. No. 6 Purdue; Elite Eight	L 73–75 ^{OT}	23–5	Wisconsin Field House; Madison, Wisconsin
*Non-conference game. ^{#}Rankings from AP Poll. (#) Tournament seedings in parentheses.
