= 1968–69 St. John's Redmen basketball team =

American college basketball season

1968–69 St. John's Redmen men's basketball

ECAC Holiday Festival, Second Place

1969 NCAA, Sweet Sixteen
- Conference: Independent

Ranking
- Coaches: No. 8
- AP: No. 8
- Record: 23–6
- Head coach: Lou Carnesecca
- Assistant coach: John Kresse
- Captains: John Warren; Carmine Calzonetti
- Home arena: Alumni Hall; Madison Square Garden

1968–69 NCAA University Division men's basketball independents standings
	Conf.				Overall
Team	W		L	PCT	W		L	PCT
No. 16 Boston College		–		–	24	–	4	.857
Rutgers		–		–	21	–	4	.840
No. 14 Marquette		–		–	24	–	5	.828
No. 12 New Mexico State		–		–	24	–	5	.828
No. 9 Duquesne		–		–	21	–	5	.808
No. 10 Villanova		–		–	21	–	5	.808
No. 8 St. John's		–		–	23	–	6	.793
Dayton		–		–	20	–	7	.741
No. 17 Notre Dame		–		–	20	–	7	.741
Seattle		–		–	20	–	8	.714
Colorado State		–		–	17	–	7	.708
Jacksonville		–		–	17	–	7	.708
St. Bonaventure		–		–	17	–	7	.708
Florida State		–		–	18	–	8	.692
West Texas State		–		–	18	–	8	.692
Holy Cross		–		–	16	–	8	.667
Oklahoma City		–		–	18	–	9	.667
Saint Francis (PA)		–		–	16	–	8	.667
Southern Illinois		–		–	16	–	8	.667
Fordham		–		–	17	–	9	.654
Army		–		–	18	–	10	.643
Texas Western		–		–	16	–	9	.640
Detroit		–		–	16	–	10	.615
Houston		–		–	16	–	10	.615
Penn State		–		–	13	–	9	.591
Boston University		–		–	14	–	10	.583
Miami (FL)		–		–	14	–	10	.583
Providence		–		–	14	–	10	.583
NYU		–		–	12	–	9	.571
DePaul		–		–	14	–	11	.560
Northern Illinois		–		–	13	–	11	.542
Virginia Tech		–		–	14	–	12	.538
Creighton		–		–	13	–	13	.500
Georgetown		–		–	12	–	12	.500
Hardin–Simmons		–		–	13	–	13	.500
Georgia Tech		–		–	12	–	13	.480
Tulane		–		–	12	–	14	.462
West Virginia		–		–	12	–	14	.462
Air Force		–		–	11	–	13	.458
Niagara		–		–	11	–	13	.458
Colgate		–		–	11	–	14	.440
Butler		–		–	11	–	15	.423
Loyola (IL)		–		–	9	–	14	.391
Fairfield		–		–	10	–	16	.385
Xavier		–		–	10	–	16	.385
Syracuse		–		–	9	–	16	.360
Utah State		–		–	9	–	17	.346
Centenary		–		–	9	–	18	.333
Navy		–		–	7	–	14	.333
Pan American		–		–	8	–	17	.320
Canisius		–		–	7	–	16	.304
St. Francis		–		–	7	–	16	.304
Loyola (LA)		–		–	5	–	19	.208
Pittsburgh		–		–	4	–	20	.167
Portland		–		–	3	–	23	.115
Denver		–		–	2	–	24	.077
Rankings from AP Poll

The 1968–69 St. John's Redmen basketball team represented St. John's University during the 1968–69 NCAA University Division men's basketball season. The team was coached by Lou Carnesecca in his fourth year at the school. St. John's home games were played at Alumni Hall and Madison Square Garden.

== Roster ==
#	Name	Height	Position	Class	Hometown	Previous School(s)
5	Carmine Calzonetti	6'1"	G	SR	Audubon, NJ	Gloucester Catholic HS
10	Jim Smyth	6'5"	G/F	JR	Brooklyn, NY	St. John's Prep
11	Billy Paultz	6'11"	C	SO	River Edge, NJ	Cameron Junior College
15	Ralph Abraham	6'5"	F	JR	Brooklyn, NY	St. John's Prep
21	Richie Jackson	6'2"	G	SR	Lynbrook, NY	St. Agnes HS
24	Bill Phillips (DNP)	7'0"	C	SO	Hollis, NY	Jamaica HS
25	Pete LaMantia	6'3"	G	SO	Bayside, NY	Bishop Reilly HS
34	Richard Gilkes	6'6"	G/F	SO	Westbury, NY	Westbury HS
30	John Warren	6'3"	G	SR	Far Rockaway, NY	Far Rockaway HS
35	John DeVasto	6'0"	G	SO	Bronx, NY	Loyola School
44	Dan Cornelius	6'9"	F/C	SR	Wyandanch, NY	Wyandanch Memorial HS
55	Joe DePre	6'3"	G	JR	Westbury, NY	Westbury HS

== Schedule and results ==
Date time, TV	Rank^{#}	Opponent^{#}	Result	Record	Site city, state
Regular Season
12/03/68*		Roanoke	W 91-65	1-0	Alumni Hall; Queens, NY
12/06/68*		at Duquesne; Steel Bowl tournament	L 62-72	1-1	Civic Arena; Pittsburgh, PA
12/07/68*		vs. Westminster; Steel Bowl tournament	W 96-65	2-1	Civic Arena; Pittsburgh, PA
12/10/68*		vs. St. Joseph's	W 64-61	3-1	The Palestra; Philadelphia, PA
12/14/68*		Georgetown	W 74-61	4-1	Alumni Hall; Queens, NY
12/18/68*		Providence	W 73-53	5-1	Alumni Hall; Queens, NY
12/21/68*		Boston College	W 85-71	6-1	Alumni Hall; Queens, NY
12/27/68*		Michigan State; ECAC Holiday Festival	W 61-51	7-1	Madison Square Garden; New York, NY
12/28/68*		No. 2 North Carolina; ECAC Holiday Festival	W 72-70	8-1	Madison Square Garden; New York, NY
12/30/68*		No. 1 UCLA; ECAC Holiday Festival	L 56-74	8-2	Madison Square Garden; New York, NY
01/04/69*	No. 17	at No. 2 Davidson	W 75-74	9-2	Charlotte Coliseum; Charlotte, NC
01/08/69*	No. 8	at Seton Hall	W 66-45	10-2	Walsh Gymnasium; South Orange, NJ
01/13/69*	No. 8	at Virginia	W 77-61	11-2	University Hall; Charlottesville, VA
01/18/69*	No. 6	West Virginia	W 91-62	12-2	Alumni Hall; Queens, NY
01/25/69*	No. 6	St. Francis (NY)	W 71-55	13-2	Alumni Hall; Queens, NY
02/01/69*	No. 6	Temple	W 65-48	14-2	Alumni Hall; Queens, NY
02/04/69*	No. 5	at No. 8 Villanova	L 78-83 ^{OT}	14-3	Villanova Field House; Villanova, PA
02/06/69*	No. 5	Rhode Island	W 73-46	15-3	Alumni Hall; Queens, NY
02/08/69*	No. 5	at Army	W 64-43	16-3	USMA Fieldhouse; West Point, NY
02/13/69*	No. 9	Niagara	W 97-60	17-3	Alumni Hall; Queens, NY
02/15/69*	No. 9	vs. Fordham	W 51-46	18-3	Madison Square Garden; New York, NY
02/19/69*	No. 7	at Syracuse	W 71-63	19-3	Manley Field House; Syracuse, NY
02/22/69*	No. 7	Colgate	W 77-62	20-3	Alumni Hall; Queens, NY
02/25/69*	No. 7	at Holy Cross	W 71-57	21-3	Worcester Auditorium; Worcester, MA
02/27/69*	No. 7	vs. NYU	W 75-64	22-3	Madison Square Garden; New York, NY
03/01/69*	No. 7	Notre Dame	L 67-71 ^{OT}	22-4	Alumni Hall; Queens, NY
NCAA Tournament
03/08/69*	No. 8	vs. Princeton; NCAA regional quarterfinal	W 72-63	23-4	Reynolds Coliseum; Raleigh, NC
03/13/69*	No. 8	vs. No. 5 Davidson; NCAA regional semifinal	L 69-79	23-5	Cole Field House; College Park, MD
03/15/69*	No. 8	vs. No. 9 Duquesne; NCAA regional third-place game	L 72-74	23-6	Cole Field House; College Park, MD
*Non-conference game. ^{#}Rankings from AP Poll. (#) Tournament seedings in parentheses.

== Team players drafted into the NBA ==
Round	Pick	Player	NBA club
1	11	John Warren	New York Knicks
