= 1916–17 Marquette Blue and Gold men's basketball team =

American college basketball season

1916–17 Marquette Golden Eagles men's basketball
- Conference: Independent
- Record: 8–2
- Head coach: Ralph Risch (1st season)
- Captain: John Fay

The 1916–17 Marquette Blue and Gold men's basketball team represented the Marquette University during the 1916–17 NCAA college men's basketball season. The head coach was Ralph Risch, it was his first season as head coach.

== Schedule ==
Date time, TV	Opponent	Result	Record	Site city, state
January 13*	at Whitewater Normal	W 35–26	1–0	
January 20*	at Milwaukee Normal	W 24–16	2–0	
January 24*	at Concordia	W 35–31	3–0	
February 3	at Campion	L 14–22	3–1	
February 16*	Carroll	L 21–24	3–2	Milwaukee, WI
February 20*	at Milwaukee Normal	W 22–07	4–2	
February 24*	Oshkosh Normal	W 24–16	5–2	Milwaukee, WI
February 26*	at Carroll	W 22–19	6–2	
March 2*	at Lawrence	W 19–14	7–2	Appleton, WI
March 10*	Beloit	W 23–14	8–2	Milwaukee, WI
*Non-conference game. (#) Tournament seedings in parentheses.

== Statistics ==
- Al Delmore 7.3 ppg
