= Al McGuire =

American basketball coach (1928–2001)

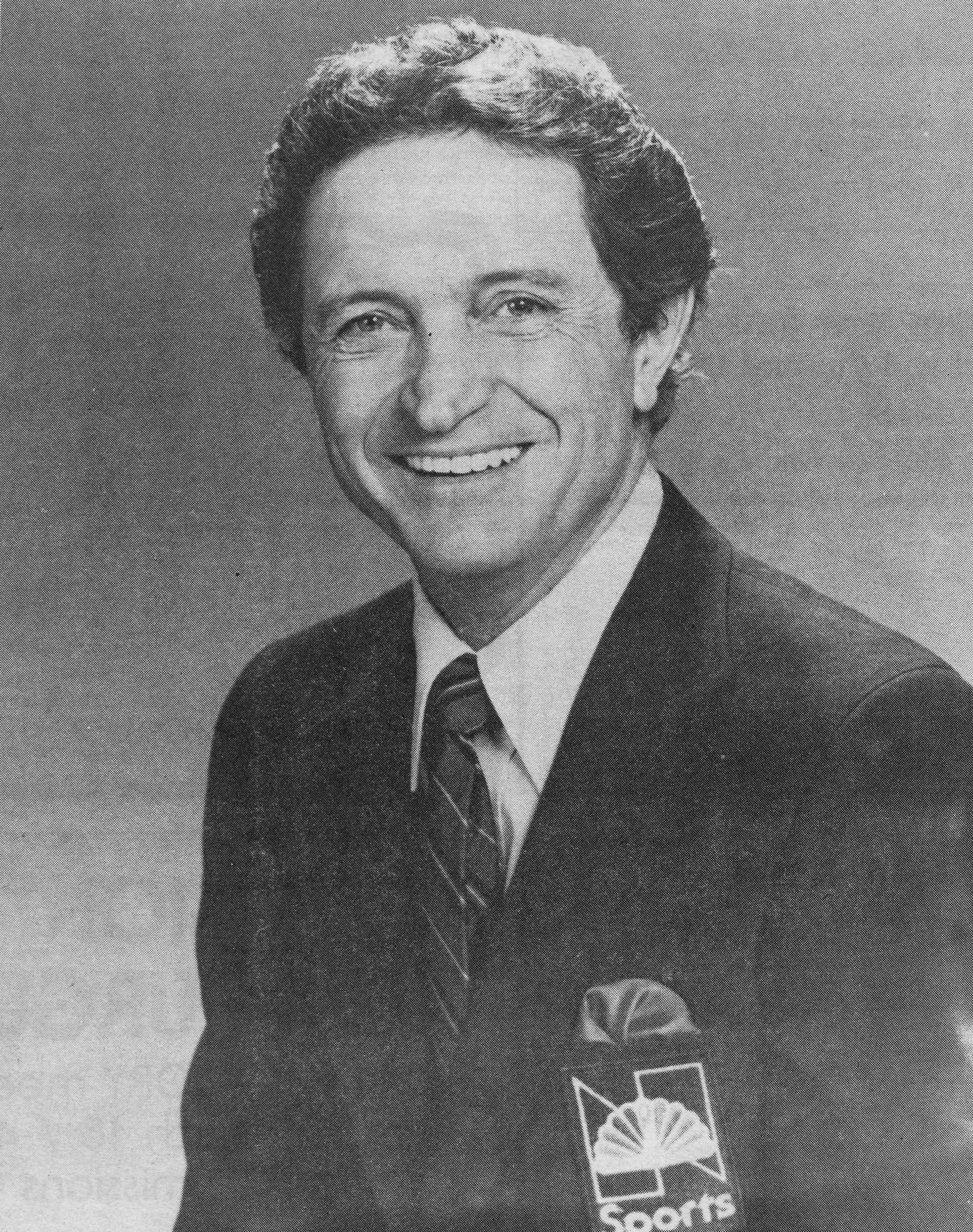
- McGuire circa 1986

Personal information
- Born: September 7, 1928 Queens, New York, U.S.
- Died: January 26, 2001 (aged 72) Brookfield, Wisconsin, U.S.
- Listed height: 6 ft 2 in (1.88 m)
- Listed weight: 180 lb (82 kg)

Career information
- High school: St. John's Prep (Brooklyn, New York)
- College: St. John's (1947–1951)
- NBA draft: 1951: 6th round, 55th overall pick
- Drafted by: New York Knicks
- Playing career: 1951–1955
- Position: Point guard
- Number: 3, 16, 7
- Coaching career: 1955–1977

Career history

Playing
- 1951–1954: New York Knicks
- 1954–1955: Baltimore Bullets

Career highlights
- As coach: NCAA champion (1977); 2× Regional Championships – Final Four (1974, 1977); NIT champion (1970); AP Coach of the Year (1971); UPI Coach of the Year (1971); Henry Iba Award (1971); NABC Coach of the Year (1974); No. 77 retired by Marquette Golden Eagles
- Stats at NBA.com
- Stats at Basketball Reference
- Basketball Hall of Fame
- Collegiate Basketball Hall of Fame

Alfred James McGuire (September 7, 1928 – January 26, 2001) was an American college basketball coach and broadcaster, the head coach at Marquette University from 1964 to 1977. He won a national championship in his final season at Marquette, and was inducted into the Naismith Memorial Basketball Hall of Fame in 1992. He was also well known as a longtime national television basketball broadcaster and for his colorful personality.

== Early life ==
McGuire grew up in Rockaway Beach, Queens, New York. He played three years of basketball at St. John's Prep, then located in Brooklyn (graduated 1947), and went on to star at St. John's University (1947–1951), where he played for four years and captained the 1951 team that posted a 26–5 mark and finished third in the NIT.

== NBA career ==
After college, McGuire played in the NBA, with his hometown New York Knicks for three seasons, 1951–54. While with the Knicks, he once famously pleaded with his coach for playing time, with this guarantee: "I can stop Cousy." Inserted into the lineup, McGuire then proceeded to foul the Celtics star on his next six trips down the court.

On September 17, 1954, the Knicks traded McGuire and Connie Simmons to the Baltimore Bullets for Ray Felix and Chuck Grigsby. McGuire played off the bench for the Bullets for 10 games, tallying 23 points in 98 minutes played. Officially, however, the NBA does not recognize those statistics. In late November, the NBA revoked the franchise of the 3–11 (and bankrupt) Bullets, and delegitimated Baltimore's games and relevant statistics from historic record. Several ex-Bullets (including All-Star Frank Selvy) joined other NBA teams. But McGuire, sidelined by a leg injury, did not, which ended his playing career.

== Coaching career ==
McGuire began his coaching career as an assistant at Dartmouth College (1955–1957) for head coach Doggie Julian. McGuire coached the freshman team at Dartmouth. One of his players was Dave Gavitt. McGuire then took his first head coaching job at Belmont Abbey College (1957–1964), in Belmont, North Carolina, where he recruited many high school players off the streets of New York. In April 1964, McGuire became head coach at Marquette University in Milwaukee, where he enjoyed success, including the NIT Championship in 1970 and a Final Four appearance in 1974 against the eventual champion NC State Wolfpack. He also served as athletic director for the program starting in 1973.

His final assistant coaches were Hank Raymonds (hired in 1961) and Rick Majerus (hired in 1971), who became a successful college head coach. He cited them as the final key to the team's success in 1977, stating, "We worked because we didn't associate socially and our rhythms were different. Hank was the encyclopedia, the administrator, the rule book with solid basketball knowledge. Rick was the cousins sandwich, the guy to bridge the age gap with the players, the recruiter with a flair for modern-day basketball. I was the Houdini, who did his disappearing act. I know that 85 percent of me is buffalo chips, and the other 15 percent is rare talent. I'd say in that 15 percent, in the mental toughness, the media, keeping an eye on the elephant, not the mice, and extending the life of the extinct kiwi bird, which is nocturnal."

McGuire led Marquette to its only NCAA basketball championship in 1977, his final season as a head coach. On December 17, 1976, McGuire stunned fans by announcing that he would retire as coach after the end of the current season, to become vice chairman of Medalist Industries, effective May 1, 1977; he had served on the board of directors of the sporting goods firm for six years. North Carolina coach and friend Dean Smith had stated that McGuire never intended to be a "lifer" as a coach. McGuire was an executive with the company for less than a year, resigning on March 20, 1978. For the entire tournament, McGuire would wear a black sport coat and gray pants that he believed was lucky. Marquette's team, led by Alfred "Butch" Lee, Maurice "Bo" Ellis and Jerome Whitehead would have a run that Maguire later referred to as "the magical weekend", which saw Whitehead receive a full-court pass and subsequently made a last-second shot to propel Marquette past UNC Charlotte in the national semifinals. Two days later, they defeated Dean Smith's North Carolina Tar Heels for the title. Ranked sixteenth, Marquette had seven losses going into the NCAA tournament, the most losses up to that time for a team that would win the NCAA Championship. The thrilling weekend in Atlanta's Omni Coliseum provided a happy sendoff. McGuire was succeeded by his assistant Hank Raymonds, who in turn was succeeded by Majerus in 1983; Marquette would not reach another Final Four until 2003.

While at Marquette, McGuire founded "Al's Run," a charity event for the Children's Hospital of Wisconsin. The race celebrated its 40th anniversary in 2017.

== Broadcasting career ==
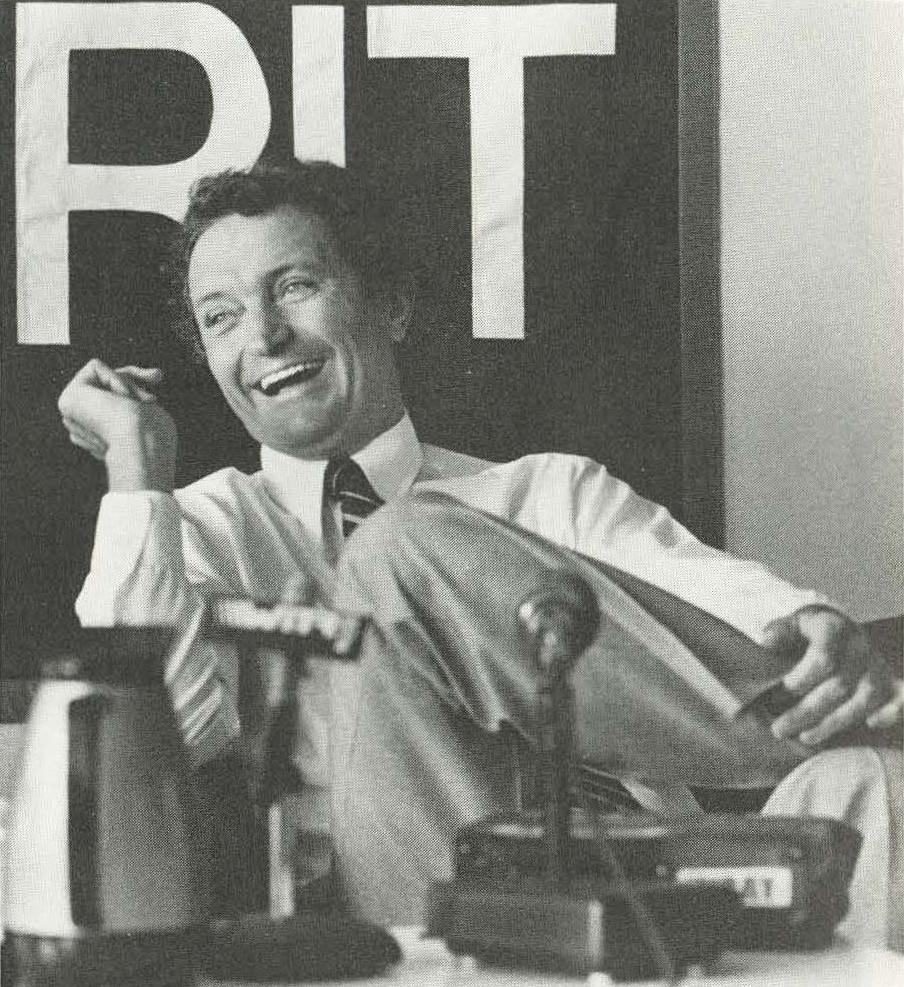
McGuire in 1980

After coaching and a brief stint in business, McGuire became a popular commentator for NBC Sports and CBS Sports. McGuire's on-air banter with colleague Billy Packer helped increase the popularity of college basketball across the United States. McGuire was courtside for the landmark 1979 championship game between Indiana State and Michigan State that pitted Larry Bird against Magic Johnson, which is remembered as a game that vastly enhanced the appeal of college basketball. Reflecting on the event ten years later, McGuire said that the 1979 title game in Salt Lake City "put college basketball on its afterburner." That national championship game remains the highest-rated NCAA Final broadcast. He announced his retirement from broadcasting after calling a matchup between Wisconsin and Indiana on March 5, 2000.

== Death ==
After a long bout with leukemia, McGuire died at age 72 in 2001 in Brookfield, Wisconsin.

== Legacy ==
The Al McGuire Center, which includes a statue in his honor, opened on the Marquette campus in 2004.

He was elected to the Wisconsin Athletic Hall of Fame in 1993.

McGuire's brother Dick (Naismith Memorial Basketball Hall of Fame inductee 1993) was also a prominent figure in basketball, having starred at St. John's and then with the New York Knicks of the NBA. Dick and Al both played for the Knicks. They are the only pair of brothers, and one of only two sibling pairs (the other being Cheryl and Reggie Miller), inducted into the Naismith Memorial Basketball Hall of Fame. Others in the Hall of Fame Class of '92 included Lou Carnesecca, Phil Woolpert, Jack Ramsay, Connie Hawkins, Bob Lanier, Sergei Belov, Nera D. White and Lusia Harris Steward. McGuire is not related to the late North Carolina and South Carolina coach Frank McGuire. Al and Frank coached against each other when Frank was head man at South Carolina. Al played for Frank at St. John's. Frank McGuire has been considered Al's coaching mentor.

McGuire was survived by his wife, Patricia, three children, sons Allie (who played for his father at Marquette) and Rob, daughter Noreen, and six grandchildren.

== Play ==
Al McGuire's former television broadcast partner and friend, Dick Enberg, penned a one-man theatrical play entitled Coach portrayed by actor Cotter Smith.

It debuted at Marquette University's Helfaer Theater in 2005, and returned there by popular demand in 2006. The play was then presented at the Alliance Theatre in Atlanta during the 2007 Final Four Championship, at Hofstra University in February 2008, and at the North Coast Repertory in San Diego County in April 2008. It returned to North Coast Rep by popular demand in August 2008, and subsequently was seen at Central Michigan University, Dick Enberg's alma mater on October 10, 2008. A benefit performance for the San Diego Chargers was presented on November 12, 2008.

From January to June 2017, the play entitled "McGuire" was presented by the Milwaukee Repertory Theater, starring Tony Award winner Anthony Crivello. That run broke all box office records for the space, playing to 'sold-out' houses in the 150 seat Stackner Cabaret. Crivello received critical praise for his work in the show, and won 2017 Wisconsin Footlights Award for "Outstanding Performance by a Leading Actor in a Play."

A five-minute presentation of the show was presented at the 2017 Wisconsin Sports Award on May 20, 2017, at the Wisconsin Field House.

Four books have been written about McGuire's life. McGuire's biography "You Can Call Me Al: The Colorful Journey of College Basketball's Original Flower Child, Al McGuire," written by Chicago area author and journalist Joseph Declan Moran with McGuire's cooperation, was first published in March 1999 by Prairie Oak Press (Madison, WI); "I Remember Al McGuire: Personal Memories and Testimonials to College Basketball's Wittiest Coach and Commentator (as told by the people who knew him)," written by Mike Towle, was published in December 2001 by Cumberland House Publishing; "Cracked Sidewalks and French Pastry: The Wit and Wisdom of Al McGuire," written by Tom Kertscher, was published by University of Wisconsin Press in November 2002; "Al McGuire: The Colorful Warrior," written by Roger Jaynes, was published by Sports Publishing LLC in July 2004.

== Career playing statistics ==
Legend
GP	Games played	GS	Games started	MPG	Minutes per game
FG%	Field goal percentage	3P%	3-point field goal percentage	FT%	Free throw percentage
RPG	Rebounds per game	APG	Assists per game	SPG	Steals per game
BPG	Blocks per game	PPG	Points per game	**Bold**	Career high

=== NBA ===
==== Regular season ====
Year	Team	GP	MPG	FG%	FT%	RPG	APG	PPG
1951–52	New York	59	13.4	**.431**	.525	2.1	1.8	3.5
1952–53	New York	58	**21.2**	.390	.637	**2.9**	**2.5**	**6.1**
1953–54	New York	**64**	13.3	.328	.436	1.9	1.6	2.7
1954–55	Baltimore	10	9.8	.281	**.714**	.9	.8	2.3
Career		191	15.5	.379	.551	2.2	1.9	4.0

==== Playoffs ====
Year	Team	GP	MPG	FG%	FT%	RPG	APG	PPG
1952	New York	**13**	16.0	.392	**.741**	**1.3**	1.1	**4.6**
1953	New York	7	8.9	.214	.000	1.0	1.3	.9
1954	New York	4	**17.3**	**.444**	.222	1.0	1.8	4.5
Career		24	14.1	.373	.512	1.2	1.3	3.5

== Head coaching record ==
Record table
Season	Team	Overall	Postseason
Belmont Abbey Crusaders (Independent) (1957–1964)
1957–58	Belmont Abbey	24–3	
1958–59	Belmont Abbey	21–2	
1959–60	Belmont Abbey	19–5	
1960–61	Belmont Abbey	17–6	
1961–62	Belmont Abbey	15–8	
1962–63	Belmont Abbey	7–21	
1963–64	Belmont Abbey	6–18	
Belmont Abbey:		109–63	
Marquette Warriors (Independent) (1964–1977)
1964–65	Marquette	8–18	
1965–66	Marquette	14–12	
1966–67	Marquette	21–9	NIT Runner-up
1967–68	Marquette	23–6	NCAA University Division Regional Third Place
1968–69	Marquette	24–5	NCAA University Division Regional Runner-up
1969–70	Marquette	26–3	NIT Champion
1970–71	Marquette	28–1	NCAA University Division Regional Third Place
1971–72	Marquette	25–4	NCAA University Division Regional Fourth Place
1972–73	Marquette	25–4	NCAA University Division Regional Third Place
1973–74	Marquette	26–5	NCAA Division I Runner-up
1974–75	Marquette	23–4	NCAA Division I First Round
1975–76	Marquette	27–2	NCAA Division I Elite Eight
1976–77	Marquette	25–7	NCAA Division I Champion
Marquette:		295–80 (.787)	
Total:		404–143 (.739)	
National champion Postseason invitational champion Conference regular season champion Conference regular season and conference tournament champion Division regular season champion Division regular season and conference tournament champion Conference tournament champion

== Coaching accomplishments ==
- Belmont Abbey record: 109–64
- Coached Belmont Abbey to five postseason appearances
- Marquette record: 295–80
- Coached team to 11 consecutive postseason bids at Marquette
- NIT championship (1970)
- Coached team to a 28–1 season (1971)
- Associated Press, United Press International and United States Basketball Writers Association Coach of the Year (1971)
- NABC Coach of the Year (1974)
- NCAA championship (1977)
- Among a select few coaches who have won both the NIT and NCAA championships
- Marquette captured its only NCAA championship with a 67–59 victory over North Carolina in McGuire's last game as coach
- More than 92 percent of his student-athletes completed requirements to earn their degrees from Marquette
- Twenty-six of his players were drafted into the NBA
- Marquette University athletic director (1973–77)
- Conducted clinics at two Air Force bases in Europe (1971)

== Broadcasting experience ==
- College basketball analyst, NBC Sports and CBS Sports
- Basketball analyst, 1988 Olympic Games
- Color commentator for one NBA on NBC telecast in 1991
- Color commentator for CBS Sports' March Madness
- Perhaps his most famous line as a commentator came during the 1992 NCAA tournament at the Bradley Center in Milwaukee, when McGuire blurted out "Holy mackerel! Holy mackerel! Holy mackerel!" following a game-winning buzzer beater by Georgia Tech's James Forrest. The shot was the first three-pointer of Forrest's collegiate career in the first game McGuire broadcast for CBS.
- Following his broadcast of a 1996 NCAA Regional Championship, McGuire garnered fame for dancing with the players of Syracuse who were celebrating their entry into the Final Four. He would do the same the following year with the players from the University of Minnesota. The Minnesota players proclaimed they wanted to "Get down with Al!"
- McGuire's broadcasting career was capped by a warm and poignant reunion less than a year before his death. When Dick Enberg joined CBS Sports in 2000 after a long career with NBC, McGuire was able to be reunited with Enberg and longtime CBS commentator Billy Packer. On February 5, 2000, the trio called its final game together when Michigan State easily defeated UCONN 85–66. It was the first game the trio had called in nineteen years when Indiana defeated North Carolina for the 1981 NCAA National Championship game for NBC.

== See also ==
- List of NCAA Division I Men's Final Four appearances by coach
