= Jack Nagle =

American basketball coach (1917–1990)

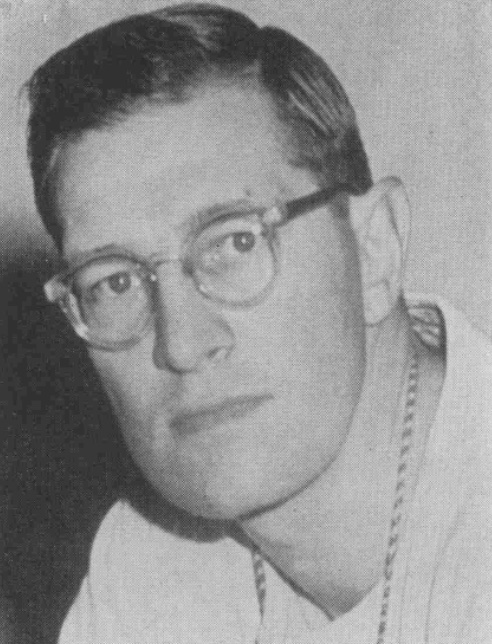
- Nagle from the 1956 Hilltop

Biographical details
- Born: 1917
- Died: August 15, 1990 (aged 73)

Playing career
- 1938–1940: Marquette

Coaching career (HC unless noted)
- 1953–1958: Marquette

Head coaching record
- Overall: 69–55 (.556)
- Tournaments: NCAA: 2–1 (.667); NIT: 0–1 (.000)

Joel "Jack" Nagle (1917 – August 15, 1990) was the head coach of the Marquette University men's basketball team from 1953 to 1958.

== Biography ==
Born in Chicago, Illinois, Nagle was educated at Shorewood High School and at Marquette, where he lettered in both the 1938–39 and 1939–40 seasons, as a reserve guard on the team.

Following graduation, Nagle served in the United States Army Air Corps (USAAC) from 1940 to 1944. After leaving the military, Nagle was named an assistant coach at Marquette under his former coach, Bill Chandler, and later under Fred "Tex" Winter. Nagle was named head coach of the Warriors in 1953 after Winter left to return to Kansas State as that school's head coach.

Nagle was also instrumental in the renaming of the team from the Marquette Hilltoppers to the Warriors.

The first Marquette men's basketball team to earn a trip to the NCAA Tournament was the 1954–55 team, in Nagle's second year as head coach. The team had its first ever 20-win season, compiling a 24–3 record. The team reached as high as No. 4 in the AP Poll before finishing the season ranked No. 8. Marquette beat Miami (Ohio) University in the first round of the tournament 90–79 and then beat No. 2 Kentucky, 79–71 in the second round. Marquette then lost to No. 5 Iowa in the Elite Eight, 86–81.

Nagle's record over five seasons at Marquette was 69–55 (55.6%).

In 1958, Nagle left the college coaching ranks and took a position at Whitefish Bay High School in suburban Milwaukee, Wisconsin, teaching freshman English grammar, composition and literature, and coaching the boys' varsity basketball team from 1962 to 1972 and the girls' varsity team from 1973 to 1989. Both his boys and girls teams made appearances in the Wisconsin state high school basketball tournament. Nagle is the only coach in American basketball history to coach teams in the NCAA tournament and both a boys and girls state high school tournament.

In the 1980s, Nagle was a scout for the Cleveland Cavaliers and later the Dallas Mavericks.

He was a charter member of the Wisconsin High School Basketball Association Hall of Fame and was voted Wisconsin High School Coach of the Year 10 times. Nagle also served as commissioner of the Continental Basketball Association.

Nagle was one of the early proponents of summer basketball camps to teach skills, beginning day camps in the mid-1960s. In 1986, he authored a popular coaching book titled Power Pattern Offenses for Winning Basketball.

He died in 1990 in Shorewood, Wisconsin.

Nagle's eldest son, Chuck, was a three-year starter at the University of Wisconsin–Madison (67/68–69/70).

== Head coaching record ==
Record table
Season	Team	Overall	Conference	Standing	Postseason
Marquette (Independent) (1953–1958)
1953–54	Marquette	11–15			
1954–55	Marquette	24–3			NCAA Elite Eight
1955–56	Marquette	13–11			NIT 1st Round
1956–57	Marquette	10–15			
1957–58	Marquette	11–11			
Total:		69–55			
National champion Postseason invitational champion Conference regular season champion Conference regular season and conference tournament champion Division regular season champion Division regular season and conference tournament champion Conference tournament champion

== Books authored ==
- Jack Nagle, Power Pattern Offenses for Winning Basketball, West Nyack, NY: Parker Publishing, 1986 (ISBN 0136877087)
