= Frank Murray (coach) =

American football and basketball coach

Biographical details
- Born: February 12, 1885; Maynard, Massachusetts, U.S.
- Died: September 12, 1951 (aged 66); Milwaukee, Wisconsin, U.S.

Coaching career (HC unless noted)

Football
- 1922–1936: Marquette
- 1937–1945: Virginia
- 1946–1949: Marquette

Basketball
- 1920–1929: Marquette

Head coaching record
- Overall: 145–89–1 (football); 94–73 (basketball)
- Bowls: 0–1
- College Football Hall of Fame; Inducted in 1983 (profile)

Frank J. Murray (February 12, 1885 – September 12, 1951) was an American college football and college basketball coach. He served as the head football coach at Marquette University from 1922 to 1936 and again from 1946 to 1949, and at the University of Virginia from 1937 to 1945, compiling a career college football coaching record of 145–89–1. Murray was also the head basketball coach at Marquette from 1920 to 1929, tallying a mark of 94–73. Murray was inducted into the College Football Hall of Fame in 1983.

== Coaching career ==
=== Marquette ===
Murray was the 13th head football coach at Marquette University in Milwaukee. He held that position for nineteen seasons, from 1922 until 1936, and then returned for four more, from 1946 until 1949. His coaching record at Marquette was 104–55–6, ranking him first in school history in wins and eighth in winning percentage (.648). In 1937, he took Marquette to the Cotton Bowl Classic.

Murray was also basketball coach at Marquette for nine seasons (1920–1929) and compiled a record of 94–73 (.563). His best team was the 1922–23 squad, which posted a 19–2 record.

=== Virginia ===
Murray later served as the head football coach at the University of Virginia from 1937 to 1945. He compiled a 41–34–5 (.544) record during his tenure. His best season came in 1941, when his Cavaliers went 8–1.

== Head coaching record ==
=== Football ===
Year	Team	Overall	Conference	Standing	Bowl/playoffs	AP^{#}
Marquette Hilltoppers / Golden Avalanche (Independent) (1922–1936)
1922	Marquette	8–0–1				
1923	Marquette	8–0				
1924	Marquette	5–2				
1925	Marquette	7–2				
1926	Marquette	6–3				
1927	Marquette	6–3				
1928	Marquette	5–3–1				
1929	Marquette	4–3–1				
1930	Marquette	8–0–1				
1931	Marquette	8–1				
1932	Marquette	4–3–1				
1933	Marquette	3–4–1				
1934	Marquette	4–5				
1935	Marquette	7–1				
1936	Marquette	7–2			L Cotton	20
Virginia Cavaliers (Independent) (1937–1945)
1937	Virginia	2–7				
1938	Virginia	4–4–1				
1939	Virginia	5–4				
1940	Virginia	4–5				
1941	Virginia	8–1				
1942	Virginia	2–6–1				
1943	Virginia	3–4–1				
1944	Virginia	6–1–2				
1945	Virginia	7–2				
Virginia:		41–34–5				
Marquette Hilltoppers (Independent) (1946–1949)
1946	Marquette	4–5				
1947	Marquette	4–5				
1948	Marquette	2–8				
1949	Marquette	4–5				
Marquette:		104–55–6				
Total:		145–89–11				
^{#}Rankings from final AP Poll.

== See also ==
- List of college football head coaches with non-consecutive tenure
