= Bob Dukiet =

American basketball player and coach (1948–2009)

Biographical details
- Born: February 5, 1948; Livingston, New Jersey, U.S.
- Died: May 28, 2009 (aged 61); Boynton Beach, Florida, U.S.

Playing career
- 1967–1970: Boston College

Coaching career (HC unless noted)
- 1970–1971: Montclair State (assistant)
- 1971–1972: Dartmouth (assistant)
- 1972–1979: Princeton (assistant)
- 1979–1986: St. Peter's
- 1986–1989: Marquette
- 1989–1996: Gannon

Robert Kevin Dukiet (February 5, 1948 – May 28, 2009) was an American college basketball coach.

== Biography ==
=== Early life ===
Dukiet was born and raised in Livingston, New Jersey and was a high school All-American at Livingston High School. He starred for Bob Cousy at Boston College, graduating cum laude in 1970 with a degree in finance and was drafted by the Los Angeles Lakers. As a sophomore for coach Cousy, Dukiet played in 24 games and shot 55% from the field (125–228). Dukiet was the team's second leading scorer with 13.6 points per game and shot 78 per cent from the line (77–99) with 68 rebounds and 24 assists. Dukiet held the BC record for best field goal percentage in one game for 14 years. He shot 78 per cent (14–18) against Rhode Island on February 13, 1968. The 1967–68 team went 17–8 and lost in the first round of the NCAA tournament to St. Bonaventure. Dukiet missed most of the next season due to a knee injury, while his team went 24–4 and finished second in the 1969 NIT to Temple. He spent most of his senior season recovering from mononucleosis.

=== Coaching career ===
Dukiet was assistant coach at Montclair State College (1970–71), Dartmouth College (1971–72) and was the assistant coach at Princeton University (1972 to 1979) where his freshman teams compiled a record of 52 wins and 15 losses. In his first season as head coach at St. Peter's College, he led the Peacocks to a 22–9 record and the quarterfinals of the NIT. The team was the best defensive squad in the nation, according to the final NCAA statistics, allowing only 50.4 points per game. Dukiet was named NBC Co-Rookie Coach of the Year with UCLA's Larry Brown and received Coach of the Year honors from Eastern Basketball Magazine, the New York and New Jersey Basketball Writers Associations, and from the ECAC Metro Conference. The next year (1980–81), his team was ranked second defensively and finished the year with a 17–9 record. Dukiet was named Metro Atlantic Athletic Conference Coach of the Year in 1981–82 after leading his team to a 20–9 record, an NIT bid and a fourth place defensive ranking. The team was also eighth in the nation in field goal percentage offense. In 1982–83, Dukiet's team went 22–5, was ranked second by the NCAA for field goal percentage offense and eighth by the NCAA for team defense. Following the 1984 season, Dukiet was again named Metro Atlantic Athletic Conference Coach of the Year after leading his team to a 23–6 record and an NIT bid. The New York and New Jersey Basketball Writers Association again chose Dukiet as its Coach of the Year and the New York Metropolitan basketball Writers named him Co-Coach of the Year along with Iona's Pat Kennedy. Dukiet's 1985–86 team ranked first in the nation in defense, allowing only 55 points per game, and finished with a 16–12 record. The team also led the nation in field goal percentage defense, holding its opponents to .411 from the field.

On July 5, 1986, Dukiet became the 12th men's basketball coach in Marquette's history. He was hired to replace Rick Majerus, who left after three seasons as head coach at MU to become an assistant for the Milwaukee Bucks. Dukiet's best team was his first, which compiled a 16–13 record and played in the first round of the NIT.

Dukiet subsequently coached at Gannon University in Erie, Pennsylvania. Dukiet coached at Gannon from 1989 to 1996, compiling a 136–67 record. Gannon advanced to the Division II national tournament four times under Dukiet, reaching the national quarterfinals in 1990.

=== Death ===
Dukiet died after a bout with stomach cancer on May 28, 2009, aged 61, in Boynton Beach, Florida.

== Head coaching record ==
=== NCAA Division I ===
Record table
Season	Team	Overall	Conference	Standing	Postseason
St. Peter's Peacocks (Eastern College Athletic Conference) (1979–1981)
1979–80	St. Peter's	22–9			NIT Quarterfinals
1980–81	St. Peter's	17–9			
St. Peter's Peacocks (Metro Atlantic Athletic Conference) (1981–1986)
1981–82	St. Peter's	20–9	9–1	1st	NIT First Round
1982–83	St. Peter's	22–5	7–3	T–2nd	
1983–84	St. Peter's	23–6	11–3	T–1st	NIT First Round
1984–85	St. Peter's	15–14	5–9	6th	
1985–86	St. Peter's	16–12	7–7	T–4th	
St. Peter's:		135–64	39–23		
Marquette Golden Eagles (Independent) (1986–1989)
1986–87	Marquette	16–13			NIT First Round
1987–88	Marquette	10–18			
1988–89	Marquette	13–15			
Marquette:		39–46			
Total:		199–110			
National champion Postseason invitational champion Conference regular season champion Conference regular season and conference tournament champion Division regular season champion Division regular season and conference tournament champion Conference tournament champion

=== NCAA Division II ===
Record table
Season	Team	Overall	Conference	Standing	Postseason
Gannon (Independent) (1989–1996)
1989–90	Gannon	24–8			NCAA Quarterfinals
1990–91	Gannon	17–13			
1991–92	Gannon	22–6			
1992–93	Gannon	20–7			NCAA First Round
1993–94	Gannon	21–9			NCAA Second Round
1994–95	Gannon	22–8			NCAA Second Round
1995–96	Gannon	10–16			
Total:		136–67			
National champion Postseason invitational champion Conference regular season champion Conference regular season and conference tournament champion Division regular season champion Division regular season and conference tournament champion Conference tournament champion
