= Hank Raymonds =

Biographical details
- Born: March 5, 1924; St. Louis, Missouri, U.S.
- Died: December 6, 2010 (aged 86); Milwaukee, Wisconsin, U.S.

Playing career
- 1942–1943: Saint Louis
- 1945–1948: Saint Louis

Coaching career (HC unless noted)
- 1950–1955: St. Louis University HS
- 1955–1961: Christian Brothers
- 1961–1977: Marquette (assistant)
- 1977–1983: Marquette

Administrative career (AD unless noted)
- 1977–1987: Marquette

Head coaching record
- Overall: 236–100 (college); 108–23 (high school)
- Tournaments: 2–5 (NCAA Division I); 0–2 (NAIA); 0–1 (NIT)

Henry C. Raymonds (March 5, 1924 – December 6, 2010) was an American basketball player, coach, and college athletics administrator. He served as the head basketball coach at Christian Brothers College from 1955 to 1961 Marquette University from 1977 to 1983. Raymonds was also the athletic director at Marquette from 1977 to 1987.

== Biography ==
=== Early life ===
At St. Louis University High School, Raymonds was a three-sport standout in baseball, basketball and football. He played one season each of varsity basketball and baseball at Saint Louis University before entering the US Marines in 1943. Following World War II, Raymonds returned to St. Louis University and earned three additional letters each in basketball and baseball, and was named to the All-Missouri Valley Conference team as guard in 1946. He was a member of Eddie Hickey's 1948 Billiken squad that won the National Invitation Tournament championship with a 24–3 record. Raymonds was graduated from St. Louis University in January 1949, with a bachelor's degree in education. His baseball talents drew the attention of major league scouts, and he was signed to a contract by the old Boston Braves.

In 1948, Raymonds played for both the Evansville Braves and Richmond Roses in minor league baseball.

=== Coaching career ===
After one year as an insurance agent, Raymonds was persuaded to try coaching. In five seasons at St. Louis University High School he compiled a 108–23 record (.824). His Junior Billikens won the 1952 Missouri State championship and were state runners-up in 1953. While coaching at the high school, Raymonds also guided the 1955 St. Louis University baseball squad to a 15–5 record and the championship of its division in the Missouri Valley Conference. Moving into the college ranks in 1955 at Christian Brothers College in Memphis, Tennessee, Raymonds transformed a weak program into a small college power with a six-year record of 110–50 (.688). Under Raymonds' guidance, CBC won three NAIA District 27 titles.

Raymonds joined the Marquette coaching ranks in 1961 as assistant basketball coach to Eddie Hickey, and coached the MU freshman and junior varsity squads from 1964 to 1973. His teams recorded an impressive 127 wins with only 18 losses. As assistant coach to Hickey's successor, Al McGuire, Raymonds was recognized as the skilled technician who coordinated and disciplined the Marquette attack.

Raymonds was head basketball coach at Marquette from 1977 to 1983 and compiled a record of 126–50 (.716) in six seasons. His teams reached post-season competition in each of the years that he was head coach. His overall record at the collegiate level is 236–100 in 12 seasons.

== Awards ==
Raymonds is a member of the Wisconsin Basketball Coaches Association Hall of Fame as well as the St. Louis University Sports Hall of Fame as well as Marquette University's M Club Hall of Fame. He was elected to the Wisconsin Athletic Hall of Fame in 2005.

== Head coaching record ==
=== College ===
Record table
Season	Team	Overall	Conference	Standing	Postseason
Christian Brothers Buccaneers (NAIA independent) (1955–1961)
1955–56	Christian Brothers	15–7			
1956–57	Christian Brothers	15–12			
1957–58	Christian Brothers	20–8			
1958–59	Christian Brothers	21–7			NAIA First Round
1959–60	Christian Brothers	21–7			NAIA First Round
1960–61	Christian Brothers	18–9			
Christian Brothers:		110–50			
Marquette Golden Eagles (NCAA Division I independent) (1977–1983)
1977–78	Marquette	24–4			NCAA Division I First Round
1978–79	Marquette	22–7			NCAA Division I Sweet 16
1979–80	Marquette	18–9			NCAA Division I First Round
1980–81	Marquette	20–11			NIT First Round
1981–82	Marquette	23–9			NCAA Division I Second Round
1982–83	Marquette	19–10			NCAA Division I First Round
Marquette:		126–50			
Total:		236–100			
