= John J. Ryan =

American athlete and coach (1886–1950)

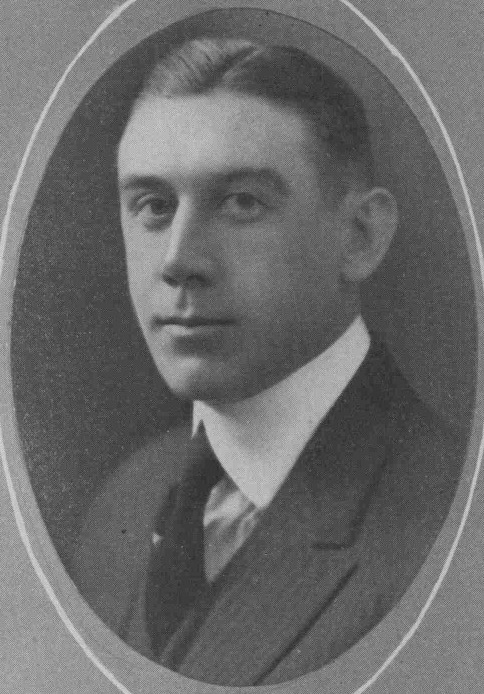
- Ryan pictured in The Hilltop 1920, Marquette yearbook

Biographical details
- Born: April 3, 1886; Waterbury, Connecticut, U.S.
- Died: April 7, 1950 (aged 64); Milwaukee, Wisconsin, U.S.

Playing career

Football
- 1906: New Hampshire
- 1908–1910: Dartmouth

Baseball
- 1909: Dartmouth
- Position: Quarterback (football)

Coaching career (HC unless noted)

Football
- 1911–1912: St. Thomas (MN)
- 1916: Marquette (advisory)
- 1917–1921: Marquette
- 1922: Dartmouth (assistant)
- 1923–1924: Wisconsin
- 1925–1929: Northwestern (ends)
- 1934–1939: Northwestern (assistant)

Basketball
- 1917–1920: Marquette

Head coaching record
- Overall: 44–11–11 (football); 13–9 (basketball)

John Joseph Ryan (April 3, 1886 – April 7, 1950) was an American college football and college basketball player and coach. He served as the head football coach at the College of St. Thomas in Saint Paul, Minnesota from 1911 to 1912, at Marquette University from 1917 to 1921, and at the University of Wisconsin from 1923 to 1924, compiling a career college football head coaching record of 44–11–11. Ryan was also the head basketball coach at Marquette from 1917 to 1920, tallying a mark of 13–9.

== Early life and playing career ==
Ryan was born on April 3, 1886, in Waterbury, Connecticut. He first attended New Hampshire College of Agriculture and the Mechanic Arts (which later became the University of New Hampshire), where he played quarterback on the 1906 New Hampshire football team. Ryan then attended Dartmouth College, where he played football, basketball, and baseball. He was captain of the 1910 Dartmouth football team.

== Coaching career ==
After graduating from Dartmouth in 1911, Ryan began his coaching career at St. Thomas College in Saint Paul, Minnesota, where he was the school's first resident athletic coach. He moved to Milwaukee, Wisconsin, in 1914, where he worked for a flour milling firm based in Minneapolis, Minnesota. He joined the football team at Marquette University in 1916 as an advisory coach under fellow Dartmouth alumnus, John B. McAuliffe. Ryan replaced McAuliffe as head coach the following year and held the post for five seasons, during which he compiled a record of 28–5–5. He returned to his alma mater in 1922 to serve as an assistant to Jackson Cannell.

In March 1923, Ryan was hired as the head football coach at the University of Wisconsin. He was also given the title of assistant professor and paid an annual salary of $6,000. Ryan helmed the Badgers football team for two seasons, tallying a mark of 5–6–4. He moved to Northwestern University in 1925, where he was the ends coach for five seasons under Glenn Thistlethwaite and Dick Hanley. Ryan returned to Hanley's staff as an assistant coach and scout in 1934, and continued on under Pappy Waldorf until 1939.

== Later life and death ==
Ryan served on the board of school directors in Milwaukee from 1940 until his death. He died on April 7, 1950, at St. Mary's Hospital in Milwaukee.

== Head coaching record ==
=== Football ===
Year	Team	Overall	Conference	Standing	Bowl/playoffs
St. Thomas Cadets (Independent) (1911–1912)
1911	St. Thomas	5–0–1			
1912	St. Thomas	6–0–1			
St. Thomas:		11–0–2			
Marquette Hilltoppers (Independent) (1917–1921)
1917	Marquette	8–0–1			
1918	Marquette	2–0–1			
1919	Marquette	5–1–2			
1920	Marquette	7–2			
1921	Marquette	6–2–1			
Marquette:		28–5–5			
Wisconsin Badgers (Big Ten Conference) (1923–1924)
1923	Wisconsin	3–3–1	1–3–1	7th	
1924	Wisconsin	2–3–3	0–2–2	T–8th	
Wisconsin:		5–6–4	1–5–3		
Total:		44–11–11			
