= Eddie Hickey =

American basketball and football coach

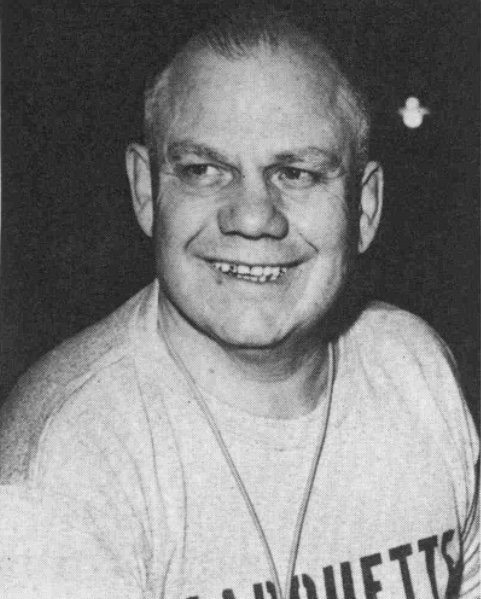
- Hickey from the 1961 “Hilltop”

Biographical details
- Born: December 20, 1902; Reynolds, Nebraska, U.S.
- Died: December 5, 1980 (aged 77); Mesa, Arizona, U.S.

Coaching career (HC unless noted)

Basketball
- 1935–1943: Creighton
- 1946–1947: Creighton
- 1947–1958: Saint Louis
- 1958–1964: Marquette

Football
- 1934: Creighton

Administrative career (AD unless noted)
- 1962–1964: Marquette

Head coaching record
- Overall: 2–7 (football); 429–230 (basketball)

Accomplishments and honors

Championships
- Basketball; NIT (1948); 7 MVC (1936, 1941–1943, 1952, 1955, 1957)

Awards
- Henry Iba Award (1959); NABC Coach of the Year (1959)
- Basketball Hall of Fame; Inducted in 1979 (profile)
- College Basketball Hall of Fame; Inducted in 2006

Edgar S. Hickey (December 20, 1902 – December 5, 1980) was an American college basketball and college football coach. He coached basketball at his alma mater of Creighton University (1935–1943, 1946–1947), Saint Louis University (1947–1958) and Marquette University (1958–1964), compiling a 429–230 record. Hickey also served as the head football coach at Creighton in 1934, tallying a mark of 2–7. After retiring from coaching, Hickey managed the American Automobile Association headquarters in Terre Haute, Indiana. He was inducted into the Naismith Memorial Basketball Hall of Fame in 1979 and the National Collegiate Basketball Hall of Fame in 2006. Hickey died of a heart attack on December 5, 1980, in Mesa, Arizona.

== Head coaching record ==
=== Basketball ===
Record table
Season	Team	Overall	Conference	Standing	Postseason
Creighton Bluejays (Missouri Valley Conference) (1935–1947)
1935–36	Creighton	13–6	8–4	T–1st	
1936–37	Creighton	11–9	8–4	2nd	
1937–38	Creighton	11–14	7–7	T–4th	
1938–39	Creighton	11–12	7–7	5th	
1939–40	Creighton	11–9	8–4	2nd	
1940–41	Creighton	18–7	9–3	1st	NCAA Regional Third Place
1941–42	Creighton	18–5	9–1	T–1st	NIT Semifinal
1942–43	Creighton	16–1	10–0	1st	NIT Quarterfinal
1946–47	Creighton	17–8	7–5	4th	
Creighton:		126–71 (.640)			
St. Louis Billikens (Missouri Valley Conference) (1947–1958)
1947–48	St. Louis	24–3	8–2	2nd	NIT Champions
1948–49	St. Louis	22–4	8–2	2nd	NIT Quarterfinal
1949–50	St. Louis	17–9	8–2	2nd	
1950–51	St. Louis	22–8	11–3	T–2nd	NIT Quarterfinal
1951–52	St. Louis	23–8	9–1	1st	
1952–53	St. Louis	16–11	5–5	T–2nd	
1953–54	St. Louis	15–12	4–6	4th	
1954–55	St. Louis	20–8	8–2	T–1st	NIT Quarterfinal
1955–56	St. Louis	18–7	8–4	T–2nd	NIT First Round
1956–57	St. Louis	19–9	12–2	1st	NCAA University Division First Round
1957–58	St. Louis	16–10	9–5	3rd	
St. Louis:		212–89 (.704)			
Marquette Warriors (NCAA University Division independent) (1958–1964)
1958–59	Marquette	23–6			NCAA University Division First Round
1959–60	Marquette	13–12			
1960–61	Marquette	16–11			NCAA University Division First Round
1961–62	Marquette	15–11			
1962–63	Marquette	20–9			NIT Semifinal
1963–64	Marquette	5–21			
Marquette:		92–70 (.568)			
Total:		429–230 (.651)			
National champion Postseason invitational champion Conference regular season champion Conference regular season and conference tournament champion Division regular season champion Division regular season and conference tournament champion Conference tournament champion

=== Football ===
Year	Team	Overall	Conference	Standing
Creighton Bluejays (Missouri Valley Conference) (1934)
1934	Creighton	2–7	2–1	2nd
Creighton:		2–7	2–1	
Total:		2–7		
