= Blase =

Blase may refer to:

- Saint Blase or Saint Blaise (4th century), patron saint of wool combers
- Blase J. Cupich (born 1949), archbishop of the Chicago Archdiocese
- Blase Bonpane (fl. 1983–2018), director of the Office of the Americas
- Tom Golisano or Blase Thomas Golisano (born 1941), American businessman and philanthropist
- Dave Blase (fl. 1958–1962), American cyclist
- Blase, Missouri, unincorporated community in St. Charles County, Missouri, U.S.

== See also ==
- Blasé (disambiguation)
- Bläse, a settlement in Fleringe on the island of Gotland, Sweden
- Blaise (disambiguation)
