= Greater Indianapolis Conference =

The Greater Indianapolis Conference is an IHSAA-sanctioned conference formed in 2018. The conference consists of charter schools in Indianapolis, including two that were formerly in the Indianapolis Public Schools system. The conference also sponsors football, as Lighthouse-East began football, joining Howe and Manual. The conference faced drastic changes in its second year, as Lighthouse-East was closed down, leaving the GIC with five members. The league responded by adding three charter schools and two public schools, including another IPS school.

== Members ==
School	City	Mascot	Colors	County	Enrollment 24–25	IHSAA Class	Year joined	Previous conference
Central Christian	Indianapolis	Chargers		49; Marion	30	1A	2021	Independents
Eminence	Eminence	Eels		55; Morgan	96	1A	2019	Independents (TRC 2010)
Indiana Math & Science	Indianapolis	Knights		49; Marion	211	1A	2018	Independents
Indianapolis; Metropolitan	Indianapolis	Pumas		49; Marion	251	1A	2018	Independents
Irvington Prep	Indianapolis	Ravens		49; Marion	328	2A	2019	Independents
Mooresville Christian	Mooresville	Eagles		55; Morgan	N/A	N/A	2024	Independents
Purdue Poly - Broad Ripple	Indianapolis	Lynx		49; Marion	229	1A	2025	Independents
Riverside	Indianapolis	Argonauts		49; Marion	398	2A	2020	Independents
Victory Prep	Beech Grove	Firehawks		49; Marion	277	1A	2018	Independents

=== Former members ===
School	City	Mascot	Colors	County	Year joined	Previous conference	Year left	New Conference
Indianapolis; Manual	Indianapolis	Redskins		49; Marion	2018	IPSAC	2021	None (merged with Christel House)
Howe	Indianapolis	Hornets		49; Marion	2018	IPSAC	2020	None (school closed)
Lighthouse East	Lawrence	Pythons		49; Marion	2018	Independents	2019	None (school closed)
Christel House	Indianapolis	Eagles		49; Marion	2019	Independents	2024	Capital City
Indianapolis; Crispus Attucks	Indianapolis	Tigers		49; Marion	2021	Independents	2024	Capital City
Indianapolis; Washington	Indianapolis	Continentals		49; Marion	2019	Independents (IPSAC 2018)	2024	Capital City
Purdue Poly - Englewood	Indianapolis	Techies		49; Marion	2020	Independents	2024	Capital City
Tindley	Indianapolis	Tigers		49; Marion	2019	Independents	2024	Capital City
