= 1969–70 Purdue Boilermakers men's basketball team =

American college basketball season

1969–70 Purdue Boilermakers men's basketball
- Conference: Big Ten Conference
- Record: 18–6 (11–3 Big Ten)
- Head coach: George King
- Home arena: Mackey Arena

1969–70 Big Ten Conference men's basketball standings
	Conf.				Overall
Team	W		L	PCT	W		L	PCT
No. 7 Iowa	14	–	0	1.000	20	–	5	.800
Purdue	11	–	3	.786	18	–	6	.750
Ohio State	8	–	6	.571	15	–	9	.625
Illinois	8	–	6	.571	15	–	9	.625
Minnesota	7	–	7	.500	13	–	11	.542
Michigan	5	–	9	.357	10	–	14	.417
Wisconsin	5	–	9	.357	10	–	14	.417
Michigan State	5	–	9	.357	9	–	15	.375
Northwestern	4	–	10	.286	9	–	15	.375
Indiana	3	–	11	.214	7	–	17	.292
Rankings from AP Poll

The 1969–70 Purdue Boilermakers men's basketball team represented Purdue University during the 1969–70 NCAA University Division men's basketball season. The Boilermakers played their home games at Mackey Arena in West Lafayette, Indiana as members of the Big Ten Conference. They were led by head coach George King in his fourth year as head coach. The Boilers finished the season 18–6, 11–3 in Big Ten play to finish in second place.

== Roster ==
1969–70 Purdue Boilermakers men's basketball team
Players
Coaches

Pos.	#	Name	Height	Weight	Year	Previous school	Hometown
F	13	Tyrone Bedford	—	—	Sr
F	33	George Faerber	6 ft 5 in (1.96 m)	—	Jr
C	23	Will Franklin	6 ft 7 in (2.01 m)	—	So
F	22	Bob Ford	6 ft 7 in (2.01 m)	—	So	North	Evansville, IN
C	31	Jerry Johnson	6 ft 10 in (2.08 m)	—	Sr	Knox	Knox, IN
C		Frank Kaufman	—	—
G		Bill Kroc	—	—	So
G		Steve Longfellow	—	—
G	10	Rick Mount	6 ft 4 in (1.93 m)	—	Sr	Lebanon	Lebanon, IN
F		Jim Rogers	6 ft 7 in (2.01 m)	—	So	Roosevelt	Gary, IN
G		Randy Thompson	—	—	So
G	11	Larry Weatherford	—	—	Jr

Head coach

- George King

Assistant coach(es)

Legend

- (C) Team captain
- (S) Suspended
- (I) Ineligible
- (W) Walk-on
- Injured
- Current redshirt

Roster
Last update: 2016=Mar-04

== Awards and honors ==
- Rick Mount, Chicago Tribune Silver Basketball and Consensus All-American
