= 1969–70 Indiana Hoosiers men's basketball team =

American college basketball season

1969–70 Indiana Hoosiers men's basketball
- Conference: Big Ten Conference
- Record: 7–17 (3–11 Big Ten)
- Head coach: Jerry Oliver (1st season)
- Assistant coach: Tom Bolyard
- Home arena: New Fieldhouse

1969–70 Big Ten Conference men's basketball standings
	Conf.				Overall
Team	W		L	PCT	W		L	PCT
No. 7 Iowa	14	–	0	1.000	20	–	5	.800
Purdue	11	–	3	.786	18	–	6	.750
Ohio State	8	–	6	.571	15	–	9	.625
Illinois	8	–	6	.571	15	–	9	.625
Minnesota	7	–	7	.500	13	–	11	.542
Michigan	5	–	9	.357	10	–	14	.417
Wisconsin	5	–	9	.357	10	–	14	.417
Michigan State	5	–	9	.357	9	–	15	.375
Northwestern	4	–	10	.286	9	–	15	.375
Indiana	3	–	11	.214	7	–	17	.292
Rankings from AP Poll

The 1969–70 Indiana Hoosiers men's basketball team represented Indiana University. Their head coach was Jerry Oliver, who was acting as head coach while the previous head coach, Lou Watson, was taking a year-long leave of absence to recover from surgery. The team played its home games in New Fieldhouse in Bloomington, Indiana, and was a member of the Big Ten Conference.

The Hoosiers finished the regular season with an overall record of 7–17 and a conference record of 3–11, finishing 10th in the Big Ten Conference. Indiana was not invited to play in any postseason tournament.

== Roster ==
No.	Name	Position	Ht.	Year	Hometown
20	Mike Niles	G	6–4	Sr.	Warsaw, Indiana
21	John Hickey	G	5–10	So.	Indianapolis, Indiana
22	Joe Cooke	G	6–3	Sr.	Toledo, Ohio
23	Larry Gipson	G	5–10	Jr.	Michigan City, Indiana
24	Ken Morgan	F	6–6	Jr.	Indianapolis, Indiana
25	Jeff Stocksdale	F	6–4	Jr.	Lima, Ohio
30	Jim Harris	G	6–1	Jr.	Lorain, Ohio
33	Ken Johnson	C	6–6	Sr.	Anderson, Indiana
34	Ben Niles	G	6–5	Jr.	Warsaw, Indiana
40	Tom Boone	G	5–10	So.	Louisville, Kentucky
42	Rick Atkinson	G	6–3	Sr.	Evansville, Indiana
43	Rick Ford	F	6–5	So.	Cloverdale, Indiana
44	Joby Wright	F	6–8	So.	Savannah, Georgia
45	Mike Branaugh	C	6–8	Sr.	Toledo, Ohio
54	Mike Szymanczyk	C	6–8	Jr.	Lansing, Illinois

== Schedule/results ==
Date time, TV	Rank^{#}	Opponent^{#}	Result	Record	Site city, state
Regular season
12/1/1969*		Northern Illinois	W 89–81	1–0	New Fieldhouse; Bloomington, IN
12/3/1969*		at Loyola (Chicago)	W 100–95	2–0	Alumni Gym; Chicago, IL
12/6/1969*		at Missouri	L 96–109	2–1	Brewer Fieldhouse; Columbia, MO
12/8/1969*		Kansas State	W 102–95	3–1	New Fieldhouse; Bloomington, IN
12/13/1969*		at No. 1 Kentucky; Indiana–Kentucky rivalry	L 92–109	3–2	Memorial Coliseum; Lexington, KY
12/15/1969*		No. 19 Ohio	L 83–89	3–3	New Fieldhouse; Bloomington, IN
12/20/1969*		No. 6 Notre Dame	L 88–89	3–4	New Fieldhouse; Bloomington, IN
12/27/1969*		vs. Princeton; Bruin Classic	L 76–82	3–5	Pauley Pavilion; Los Angeles, CA
12/29/1969*		vs. Georgia Tech; Bruin Classic	W 87–65	4–5	Pauley Pavilion; Los Angeles, CA
1/3/1970		Michigan State	L 84–85	4–6 (0–1)	New Fieldhouse; Bloomington, IN
1/6/1970		at Illinois; Rivalry	L 74–94	4–7 (0–2)	Assembly Hall; Champaign, IL
1/10/1970		at Minnesota	L 65–77	4–8 (0–3)	Williams Arena; Minneapolis, MN
1/27/1970*		at DePaul	L 70–75	4–9 (0–3)	Alumni Hall; Chicago, IL
1/31/1970		at No. 20 Iowa	L 93–100	4–10 (0–4)	Iowa Field House; Iowa City, IA
2/3/1970		Northwestern	W 80–78	5–10 (1–4)	New Fieldhouse; Bloomington, IN
2/7/1970		No. 20 Iowa	L 89–104	5–11 (1–5)	New Fieldhouse; Bloomington, IN
2/10/1970		at Purdue; Rivalry	L 80–98	5–12 (1–6)	Purdue Arena; West Lafayette, IN
2/14/1970		Ohio State	L 83–100	5–13 (1–7)	New Fieldhouse; Bloomington, IN
2/17/1970		Wisconsin	W 89–77	6–13 (2–7)	New Fieldhouse; Bloomington, IN
2/21/1970		at Michigan State	L 66–78	6–14 (2–8)	Jenison Fieldhouse; East Lansing, MI
2/24/1970		Michigan	W 102–93	7–14 (3–8)	New Fieldhouse; Bloomington, IN
2/28/1970		at Northwestern	L 66–75	7–15 (3–9)	Welsh-Ryan Arena; Evanston, IL
3/3/1970		Illinois; Rivalry	L 75–85	7–16 (3–10)	New Fieldhouse; Bloomington, IN
3/7/1970		at Michigan	L 99–108	7–17 (3–11)	Crisler Arena; Ann Arbor, MI
*Non-conference game. ^{#}Rankings from AP Poll. (#) Tournament seedings in parentheses.
