= 1969–70 Michigan Wolverines men's basketball team =

American college basketball season

1969–70 Michigan Wolverines men's basketball
- Conference: Big Ten Conference
- Record: 10–14 (5–9 Big Ten)
- Head coach: Johnny Orr
- Assistant coaches: Fred Snowden; George Pomey (freshmen); Dick Honig
- MVP: Rudy Tomjanovich
- Captain: Rudy Tomjanovich
- Home arena: Crisler Arena

1969–70 Big Ten Conference men's basketball standings
| | Conf. | | | | Overall |
| Team | W | | L | PCT | W | | L | PCT |
|---|---|---|---|---|---|---|---|---|
| No. 7 Iowa | 14 | – | 0 | 1.000 | 20 | – | 5 | .800 |
| Purdue | 11 | – | 3 | .786 | 18 | – | 6 | .750 |
| Ohio State | 8 | – | 6 | .571 | 15 | – | 9 | .625 |
| Illinois | 8 | – | 6 | .571 | 15 | – | 9 | .625 |
| Minnesota | 7 | – | 7 | .500 | 13 | – | 11 | .542 |
| Michigan | 5 | – | 9 | .357 | 10 | – | 14 | .417 |
| Wisconsin | 5 | – | 9 | .357 | 10 | – | 14 | .417 |
| Michigan State | 5 | – | 9 | .357 | 9 | – | 15 | .375 |
| Northwestern | 4 | – | 10 | .286 | 9 | – | 15 | .375 |
| Indiana | 3 | – | 11 | .214 | 7 | – | 17 | .292 |
Rankings from AP Poll

The 1969–70 Michigan Wolverines men's basketball team represented the University of Michigan in intercollegiate college basketball during the 1969–70 season. The team played its home games at Crisler Arena on the school's campus in Ann Arbor, Michigan. Under the direction of head coach Johnny Orr, the team finished tied for fourth in the Big Ten Conference. The team was unranked the entire season in the Associated Press Top Twenty Poll, and it also ended the season unranked in the final UPI Coaches' Poll. The team lost to all three ranked opponents that it faced. Rudy Tomjanovich served as team captain and earned team MVP. Over the course of the season Tomjanovich led the conference in rebounding with a 16.2 average in conference games. Tomjanovich was a 1970 NCAA All-American. During the season, Tomjanovich broke Bill Buntin's school career records for total (1037) and average rebounds (13.13) by posting 1039 and 14.43. This record still stands. He also set the current school record for single-season 30-point games with 13, surpassing Cazzie Russell's total of nine set four years earlier. Although Michigan basketball does not officially keep records of assists before 1977 (noting in the record book that records are only available since 1977), Mark Henry was credited as the first Michigan Wolverines player on record to total 12 assists in a game on January 24, 1970, against the Michigan State Spartans. No Wolverine on record would surpass 12 assists in a game until Mark Bodnar did so on December 13, 1980.

== Roster ==
1969–70 Michigan Wolverines men's basketball team
Players
Coaches

| Pos. | # | Name | Height | Weight | Year | Hometown |
|---|---|---|---|---|---|---|
| G | 25 | Richard Carter | 6 ft 1 in (1.85 m) | 155 lb (70 kg) | Sr | Detroit, Michigan |
| G | 24 | Dan Fife | 6 ft 2 in (1.88 m) | 188 lb (85 kg) | Jr | Clarkston, Michigan |
| F | 40 | Wayne Grabiec | 6 ft 6 in (1.98 m) | 195 lb (88 kg) | So | Downers Grove, Illinois |
| G | 44 | Dave Hart | 5 ft 8 in (1.73 m) | 160 lb (73 kg) | So | Ypsilanti, Michigan |
| G | 20 | Harry Hayward | 6 ft 4 in (1.93 m) | 210 lb (95 kg) | Jr | Wildwood, New Jersey |
| C | 34 | Tim Nicksic | 6 ft 5 in (1.96 m) | 215 lb (98 kg) | Jr | East Chicago, Indiana |
| F | 45 | Rudy Tomjanovich | 6 ft 7 in (2.01 m) | 210 lb (95 kg) | Sr | Hamtramck, Michigan |

Head coach

- Johnny Orr

Assistant coach(es)

Legend

- (C) Team captain
- (S) Suspended
- (I) Ineligible
- (W) Walk-on
- Injured
- Current redshirt

== Team players drafted into the NBA ==
Three players from this team were selected in the NBA draft.

| Year | Round | Pick | Overall | Player | NBA Club |
| 1970 | 1 | 2 | 2 | Rudy Tomjanovich | San Diego Rockets |
| 1971 | 10 | 16 | 168 | Dan Fife | Milwaukee Bucks |
| 1972 | 3 | 14 | 44 | Wayne Grabiec | Boston Celtics |
