= 1969–70 Iowa Hawkeyes men's basketball team =

American college basketball season

1969–70 Iowa Hawkeyes men's basketball
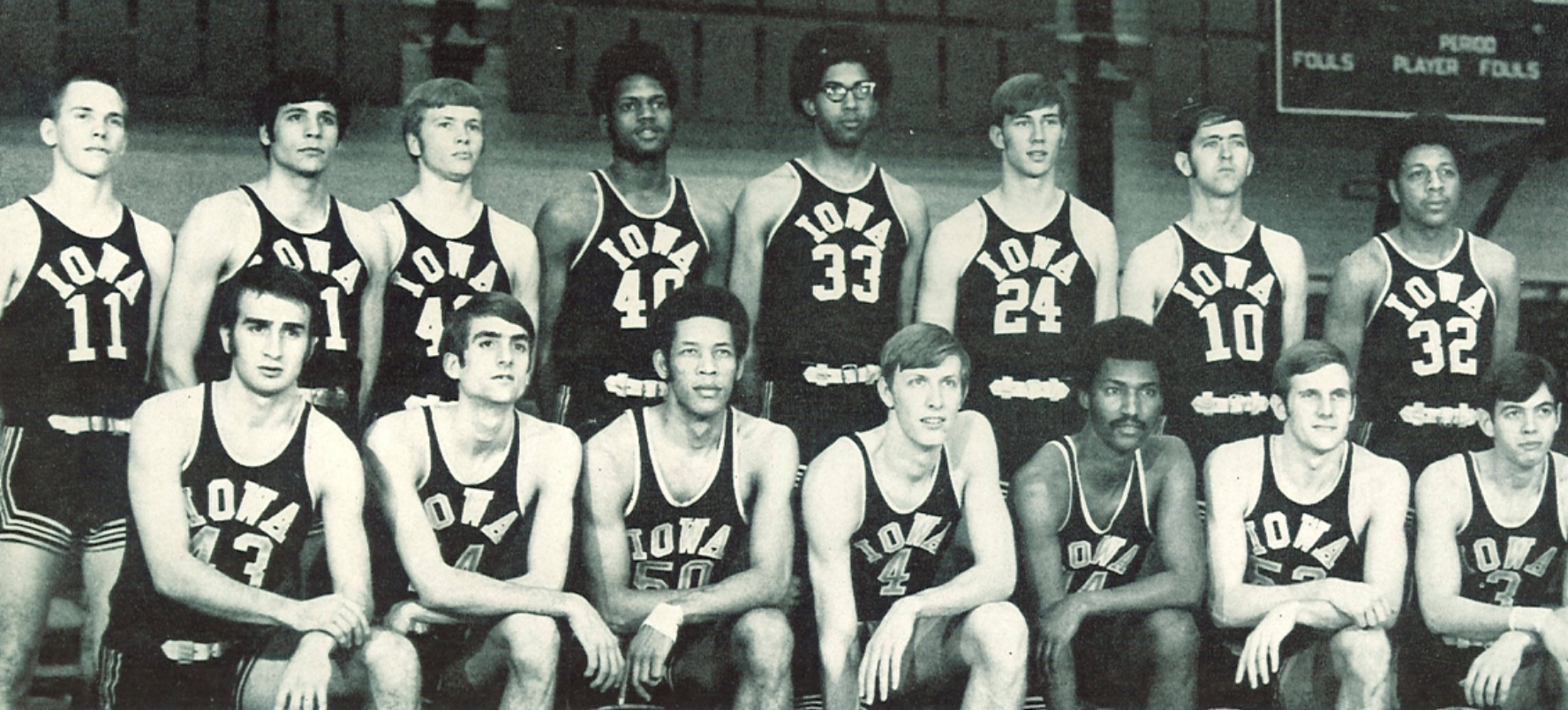

Big Ten Champions

NCAA Men's Division I Tournament, Sweet Sixteen Mideast Regional, Third Place
- Conference: Big Ten Conference

Ranking
- Coaches: No. 7
- AP: No. 7
- Record: 20–5 (14–0 Big Ten)
- Head coach: Ralph Miller (6th season)
- Assistant coaches: Lanny Van Eman; Dick Schultz
- MVP: John Johnson
- Home arena: Iowa Field House (capacity: 13,365)

1969–70 Big Ten Conference men's basketball standings
	Conf.				Overall
Team	W		L	PCT	W		L	PCT
No. 7 Iowa	14	–	0	1.000	20	–	5	.800
Purdue	11	–	3	.786	18	–	6	.750
Ohio State	8	–	6	.571	15	–	9	.625
Illinois	8	–	6	.571	15	–	9	.625
Minnesota	7	–	7	.500	13	–	11	.542
Michigan	5	–	9	.357	10	–	14	.417
Wisconsin	5	–	9	.357	10	–	14	.417
Michigan State	5	–	9	.357	9	–	15	.375
Northwestern	4	–	10	.286	9	–	15	.375
Indiana	3	–	11	.214	7	–	17	.292
Rankings from AP Poll

The 1969–70 Iowa Hawkeyes men's basketball team represented the University of Iowa in intercollegiate basketball during the 1969–70 season. The team was led by Ralph Miller and played their home games at the Iowa Field House. The Hawkeyes finished the season 20–5 and won the Big Ten title with a 14–0 conference record. To date, this is the last outright regular season conference title for the Iowa men's basketball team.

After opening the season 3–4, the Hawkeyes won 17 of their final 18 games. Led by a nucleus of players known as the "Six Pack" – John Johnson, Chad Calabria, Fred Brown, Glenn "Stick" Vidnovic, Dick Jensen, and Ben McGilmer – the team averaged 98.7 points per game including a conference-record 102.9 points per game in Big Ten games. They opened NCAA tournament play with a 104–103 loss to eventual National runner-up Jacksonville. The Hawkeyes regrouped to defeat Notre Dame 121–106 in the Mideast Regional Third-Place game.

== Roster ==
1969–70 Iowa Hawkeyes men's basketball team
Players
Coaches

Pos.	#	Name	Height	Weight	Year	Hometown
G	3	Jim Hodge	6 ft 0 in (1.83 m)	—	Sr
F/C	4	Dick Jensen	6 ft 8 in (2.03 m)	—	Sr	Madrid, Iowa
	10	George Conway	—	—	Jr
	11	Gary Lusk	—	—	So
F/C	14	Ben McGilmer	6 ft 7 in (2.01 m)	—	Sr
	24	Ken Grabinski	—	—	So
G	32	Fred Brown	6 ft 3 in (1.91 m)	—	Jr	Milwaukee, Wisconsin
C	33	Tom Miller	6 ft 9 in (2.06 m)	—	Jr
	40	Omar Hazley	—	—	Jr
	42	Lynn Rowat	—	—	So
G	43	Chad Calabria	6 ft 1 in (1.85 m)	—	Sr	Aliquippa, Pennsylvania
F	44	Glenn Vidnovic	6 ft 5 in (1.96 m)	—	Sr	McKeesport, Pennsylvania
F	50	John Johnson	6 ft 7 in (2.01 m)	200 lb (91 kg)	Sr	Milwaukee, Wisconsin
	51	Joe Miranda	—	—	Sr
	52	Tom Schulze	—	—	Sr

Head coach

- Ralph Miller (Kansas)

Assistant coach(es)

Legend

- (C) Team captain
- (S) Suspended
- (I) Ineligible
- (W) Walk-on
- Injured
- Current redshirt

== Schedule/results ==
Date time, TV	Rank^{#}	Opponent^{#}	Result	Record	High points	High rebounds	High assists	Site (attendance) city, state
Regular season
12/6/1969*		at Southern Illinois	L 67–73	0–1	–	–	–	SIU Arena; Carbondale, Illinois
12/9/1969*		St. Francis (PA)	W 81–68	1–1	–	–	–	Iowa Field House (12,909); Iowa City, IA
12/11/1969*		No. 7 Duquesne	W 98–87	2–1	23 – Vidnovic	13 – Johnson	–	Iowa Field House; Iowa City, IA
12/18/1969*		at Cincinnati	L 105–114	2–2	33 – Johnson	–	–	Armory Fieldhouse (7,000); Cincinnati, Ohio
12/20/1969*		Creighton	L 88–97	2–3	–	–	–	Iowa Field House; Iowa City, IA
12/22/1969*		Drake; Rivalry	W 101–78	3–3	23 – Calabria	13 – Johnson	–	Iowa Field House (13,503); Iowa City, IA
12/26/1969*		vs. St. John's; Rainbow Classic	L 55–57	3–4	–	–	–	Honolulu International Center; Honolulu
12/30/1969*		at Hawaii; Rainbow Classic	W 111–60	4–4	33 – Johnson	–	–	Honolulu International Center; Honolulu, HI
1/3/1970		No. 17 Purdue	W 94–88	5–4 (1–0)	–	–	–	Iowa Field House; Iowa City, IA
1/6/1970		at Michigan	W 107–99	6–4 (2–0)	34 – Johnson	–	–	Crisler Arena; Ann Arbor, Michigan
1/10/1970		at Wisconsin	W 92–74	7–4 (3–0)	31 – Johnson	–	–	Wisconsin Field House; Madison, Wisconsin
1/24/1970*	No. 20	Tennessee Tech	W 96–68	8–4	25 – Calabria	11 – McGilmer	–	Iowa Field House; Iowa City, IA
1/31/1970	No. 20	Indiana	W 100–93	9–4 (4–0)	31 – Vidnovic	–	–	Iowa Field House; Iowa City, IA
2/3/1970	No. 20	Minnesota	W 90–77	10–4 (5–0)	33 – Johnson	–	–	Iowa Field House; Iowa City, IA
2/7/1970	No. 20	at Indiana	W 104–89	11–4 (6–0)	33 – Johnson	–	–	New Fieldhouse; Bloomington, Indiana
2/10/1970	No. 14	Wisconsin	W 119–100	12–4 (7–0)	29 – Tied	8 – Johnson	–	Iowa Field House; Iowa City, IA
2/14/1970	No. 14	Michigan State	W 103–77	13–4 (8–0)	36 – Johnson	–	–	Iowa Field House; Iowa City, IA
2/17/1970	No. 11	at Illinois; Rivalry	W 83–81	14–4 (9–0)	22 – Brown	–	–	Assembly Hall (16,128); Champaign, Illinois
2/21/1970	No. 11	at Ohio State	W 97–89	15–4 (10–0)	38 – Johnson	–	–	St. John Arena; Columbus, Ohio
2/24/1970; 7:30 pm	No. 9	Northwestern	W 116–97	16–4 (11–0)	49 – Johnson	–	–	Iowa Field House (13,503); Iowa City, IA
2/28/1970	No. 9	at Purdue	W 108–107	17–4 (12–0)	26 – Johnson	12 – Johnson	–	Purdue Arena (14,123); West Lafayette, Indiana
3/3/1970; 7:30 pm	No. 8	Ohio State	W 113–92	18–4 (13–0)	37 – Johnson	–	–	Iowa Field House; Iowa City, IA
3/7/1970	No. 8	at Northwestern	W 115–101	19–4 (14–0)	32 – Johnson	–	–	Welsh-Ryan Arena; Evanston, Illinois
NCAA tournament
3/12/1970*	No. 7	vs. No. 4 Jacksonville; Regional semifinal	L 103–104	19–5	27 – Brown	8 – Tied	–	St. John Arena; Columbus, Ohio
3/14/1970*	No. 7	vs. No. 9 Notre Dame; Regional consolation	W 121–106	20–5	31 – Tied	11 – Vidnovic	–	St. John Arena (13,865); Columbus, Ohio
*Non-conference game. ^{#}Rankings from AP Poll. (#) Tournament seedings in parentheses.

== Rankings ==
Ranking movements Legend: ██ Increase in ranking ██ Decrease in ranking — = Not ranked
	Week														
Poll	Pre	1	2	3	4	5	6	7	8	9	10	11	12	13	Final
AP	—	—	—	—	—	—	—	18	20	20	14	11	9	8	7
Coaches	—	—	—	—	—	—	—	—	—	—	11	9	8	7	7

== Player stats ==
Player	Games played	FG-FGA	FG%	FT-FTA	FT%	Rebounds	Points	Avg.
John Johnson	25	289-508	.569	121-161	.752	253	699	27.9
Chad Calabria	25	181-330	.548	117-146	.801	139	479	19.1
Fred Brown	24	180-360	.500	69-86	.802	91	429	17.9
Glenn Vidnovic	25	150-278	.540	133-152	.875	164	433	17.3
Ben McGilmer	25	100-178	.562	58-70	.829	109	258	10.3
Dick Jensen	23	29-80	.363	14-29	.483	111	72	3.1

== Awards and honors ==
- John Johnson – Third-Team All-American, AP and UPI; school-records of 27.9 ppg and 49 points in a single game vs. Northwestern on Feb. 24, 1970

== Team players in the 1970 NBA draft ==
Round	Pick	Player	NBA club
1	7	John Johnson	Cleveland Cavaliers
