= Marian University Marching Band =

Marching band

The Marian University Marching Band
- School: Marian University
- Location: Indianapolis, Indiana, US
- Conference: Mid-Central College Conference
- Founded: 2009
- Director: Kathryn Spangler
- Members: 60

The Marian University Marching Band, is the official marching band of Marian University in Indianapolis, Indiana. The marching band is the largest student organization on campus and the university's largest for-credit course. Under the leadership of Dr. Sid Hearn, the Marian University Marching Band took the field for the first time on September 19, 2009.

Since then, the band has performed for many events on and off campus. The band performs for home football games, parades, pep rallies, campus sporting events, community concerts, and private events. Recently, the Marian University Marching Band has become widely requested as an exhibition band for high school band competitions across the Midwest, performing headline exhibitions at various Bands of America events since 2010. These include the Indianapolis Public Schools Tournament of Bands portion of the Grand National Championships, the Super Regional in Indianapolis, and Finals portion of the Grand National Championships, al of which were held at Lucas Oil Stadium.

== History ==
In 1964, student John Sweany had a vision to bring the excitement that he experienced through his high school marching band to Marian College. With only six classmates and some bargain instruments, John formed the Marian Blue Knights—the first non-military collegiate Drum and Bugle Corps in the United States. Through dedication and skill, Sweany was able to take his corps to unexpected heights and provide the heartbeat of the campus for 12 years.

During its existence, the Marian Blue Knights performed at:

- Holland Tulip Festival
- Indianapolis 500 Festival Parade
- Niagara Falls Blossom Festival
- Kentucky Derby Parade
- United States Capitol
- Walt Disney World
- Washington, D. C.

For over a decade, the corps was the heartbeat of the Marian College campus until it became inoperative in the late 1970s. In 1984, one of the most successful drum and bugle corps in the history of DCI rose from the ashes of the defunct Marian College Blue Knights when the Star of Indiana was founded in Bloomington using Marian College Blue Knight bugles and equipment.

== Rebirth ==
With the formation of a football team in 2007, Marian University president Daniel J. Elsener sought to create a marching band that could provide fans with a "college atmosphere" during games. During the 2009 season, the band fielded a drum line and horn line. Color Guard was added for the 2010 season, and 2011 saw the addition of pit percussion. In 2012, Marian University fielded its first Winter Guard as competitive members of the MidWest Color Guard Circuit and qualified as a finalist in the Independent A classification during this first season. The winter guard, known as "Knightro" of Marian University, made their Winter Guard International debut in 2013 at the Southeastern Regional in Chattanooga, Tennessee, and was named the 2013 Independent Open Class Silver Medalists at the MidWest Color Guard Circuit Championships.
