= Coral Springs Charter School =

Charter school in Coral Springs, Florida, United States

Coordinates: 26.2713889°N 80.2497221°W

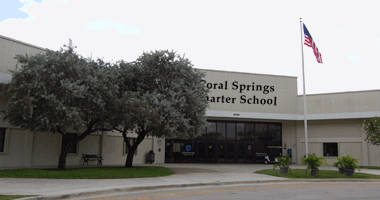
- 3205 North University Drive, Coral Springs, Florida 33065; United States

Information
- Type: Charter
- Motto: Once a panther, always a panther
- Established: 1999
- School district: Broward County Public Schools
- Principal: Jodi Robins
- Staff: 98.00 (FTE)
- Grades: 6–12
- Enrollment: 1,743 (2023–2024)
- Student to teacher ratio: 17.79
- Colors: █ Navy Blue █ Carolina Blue
- Athletics: football, soccer, cross-country, swimming, volleyball, cheerleading, basketball, wrestling, lacrosse, baseball, softball, track and field, tennis, flag football, bowling, marching band
- Team name: Panthers
- Website: www.coralspringscharter.org

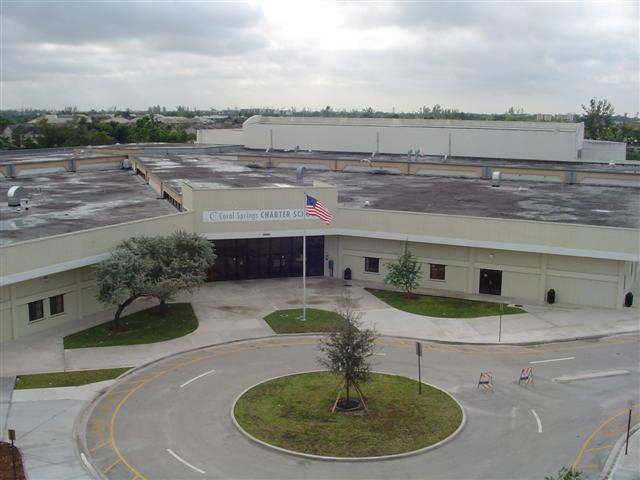
Older picture of front of building

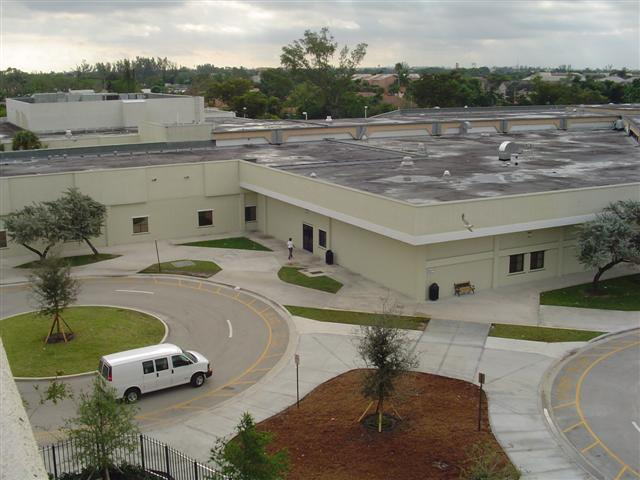
Another view from Garage

Coral Springs Charter School was established in 1999 in Coral Springs, Florida, United States. The school was originally constructed in 1977 as an enclosed mall. When the mall failed, the nearly vacant structure was purchased by Charter Schools USA and converted into a combination school, serving students in grades 6 through 12. The high school portion also currently utilizes Block Scheduling while the middle school portion uses a double rotating schedule.

== See also ==
- Charter school
