= Jerry Oliver =

American basketball coach (1930–2020)

Biographical details
- Born: November 3, 1930; Rochester, Indiana, U.S.
- Died: September 25, 2020 (aged 89); Brownsburg, Indiana, U.S.
- Education: Ball State

Coaching career (HC unless noted)
- 1960–1968: George Washington HS
- 1968–1971: Indiana (assistant)
- 1969–1970, 1971: Indiana (acting)
- 1971–1974: Warren Central HS
- 1974–1980: Indiana Pacers (assistant)

Head coaching record
- Overall: 4–17

Accomplishments and honors

Championships
- Indiana state champion (1965)

Jerry Anderson Oliver (November 30, 1930 – September 25, 2020) was an American basketball coach who served as the head coach of the Indiana Hoosiers men's basketball team during the 1969–70 season and for the final game of the 1970–71 season.

Oliver began his coaching career at George Washington High School where he won the 1965 state championship. Billy Keller, George McGinnis, and Steve Downing were among the players Oliver coached at Indianapolis Washington.

Oliver joined Indiana's coaching staff in 1968 as an assistant to Lou Watson. Oliver served as acting head coach of the Hoosiers for the final 20 games of the 1969–70 season while Watson was recovering from surgery. Oliver served as acting head coach again the following season when Watson resigned before the final game of the season.

After three seasons at Warren Central High School, Oliver was hired by the Indiana Pacers where he served as an assistant coach (1974–1980) and director of player personnel (1980–1981).

After his coaching career, Oliver served as the manager of the Hoosier Dome and Florida Suncoast Dome.

Oliver served in the United States Army. He died on September 25, 2020.
