= Northwest High School (Indiana) =

Public high school in Indianapolis, Indiana, US

Northwest Community High School

Location
- 5525 West 34th Street; Indianapolis, Marion County, Indiana 46224; United States; 39.814440°N 86.257807°W

Information
- Type: Public high school
- Established: 1963
- School district: Indianapolis Public Schools
- Principal: Michelle Brittain-Watts
- Faculty: 65.00 FTE
- Grades: 9-12
- Enrollment: 789 (2014–15)
- Color
- Athletics conference: Indianapolis Public School Conference
- Team name: Space Pioneers
- Website: Official Website

Northwest High School, located at 5525 W. 34th St. Indianapolis, Indiana, was a traditional high school operated by the publicly funded Indianapolis Public Schools organization. It closed in 2018.

== About ==
The school, built in 1962–1963, adopted a unique school mascot called the "Space Pioneer," a reference to the United States' early man-in-space program underway during the school's founding. This reference to the space program can also be found in the school paper, Telstar, and the yearbook, the Vanguard.

The first classes entered Northwest High School in Indianapolis in September 1963. In the beginning, there was no Senior Class. The first Sophomores and Juniors transferred from other area high schools, mainly George Washington High School. These two classes were the graduating [Seniors in 1965] and 1966, respectively. Class enrollment at Northwest would increase over the years and at the end of the 70's the graduating class comprised 400 seniors.

The freshman class in 1963 would be the first class to complete all 4 years of high school at Northwest graduating in June 1967.

It should be mentioned that in September, 1963 there was an 8th Grade class at Northwest. This class was housed in a remote unfinished area of the school while their local elementary school was under construction. This group then became the Class of 1968 and holds the distinction of being the only class to attend Northwest High School for five years.

In 2011, Northwest High School began to let in middle school grades 7 and 8, even taking the Northwest Community High School. The school provides curriculum for grades 7 through 12 as well as specialized programs for international studies.

== Notable alumni ==
- Actress Kristina Wagner, who starred in the American television soap opera General Hospital in the 1980s and 1990s, is a 1981 graduate of this school.
- Rodney Carney, (born April 5, 1984, in Indianapolis, Indiana) is an American professional basketball player. He played college basketball at the University of Memphis and was selected in the 2006 NBA Draft by the Chicago Bulls and shortly afterward traded to the Philadelphia 76ers.
- Paul Spicer, (born August 18, 1975, in Indianapolis, Indiana) is an American football defensive end for the Jacksonville Jaguars of the NFL.
- Kurt Kelso, Hall of Fame Athletic inductee at Rose-Hulman Institute of Technology

== See also ==
- List of schools in Indianapolis
- List of high schools in Indiana
