= Rick Fuson =

National Basketball Association executive

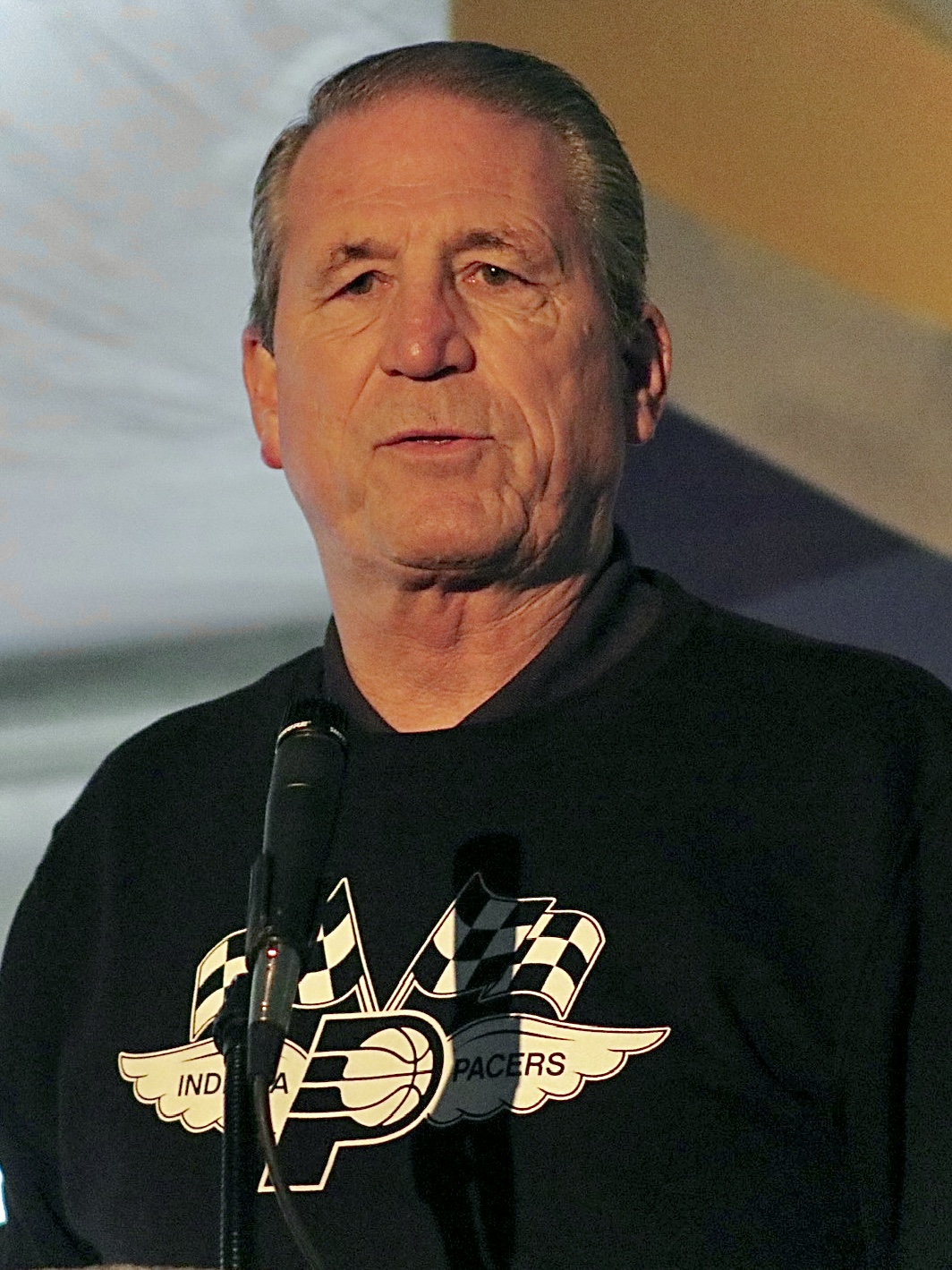
- Fuson in 2019

Indiana Pacers
- Positions: Chief Operating Officer & President
- League: NBA

Personal information
- Born: Indianapolis, Indiana

Career information
- High school: Arlington High School
- College: Indiana University

Rick Fuson (born 1953) was the CEO and president of the Indiana Pacers since 2014. Fuson is also a chairman of the Indiana Sports Corp board of directors.

== Early life and career ==
Rick's father, Wayne Fuson Sr., was the sports editor for the Indianapolis News. His parents lived in Terre Haute and Clay County before relocating to Indianapolis and giving birth to Rick.

In 1971, Fuson graduated from Arlington High School. Fuson earned his degree in political science at Indiana University in 1975. While attending college, he played on the Indiana Hoosiers football team for two years under John Pont. After graduating from IU, Fuson moved to California and worked on a Lilly Endowment grant. Fuson went back to Indiana and sold bulldozers for McAllister Machinery Company for nearly ten years. His dad linked him up with Larry Conrad, the former secretary of state of Indiana and spokesperson for the Simon family (Herbert Simon and Melvin Simon) who bought the Pacers in the 1983-84 season. Bob Salyers (former GM and president of the Pacers) hired him.

== Indiana Pacers ==
Fuson began working for the Pacers organization in 1984 as director of special events. Fuson oversaw the development and move to the Conseco Fieldhouse.

Fuson worked for Donnie Walsh and Jim Morris. Fuson was promoted to COO/president in 2014 when Morris changed position to the vice chairman role.

== See also ==
- List of National Basketball Association team presidents
