= James Brewer (American football) =

American football player (born 1987)

No. 73
- Position: Offensive tackle

Personal information
- Born: December 23, 1987 (age 38); Indianapolis, Indiana, U.S.
- Listed height: 6 ft 6 in (1.98 m)
- Listed weight: 330 lb (150 kg)

Career information
- High school: Indianapolis Arlington
- College: Indiana
- NFL draft: 2011: 4th round, 117th overall pick

Career history
- New York Giants (2011–2014); New York Jets (2015)*
- * Offseason or practice squad member only

Awards and highlights
- Super Bowl champion (XLVI)

Career NFL statistics
- Games played: 26
- Games started: 8
- Stats at Pro Football Reference

James Da'One Brewer (born December 23, 1987) is an American former professional football player who was an offensive tackle in the National Football League (NFL). He was selected by the New York Giants in the fourth round of the 2011 NFL draft. He played college football for the Indiana Hoosiers.

== Professional career ==
Pre-draft measurables
Height	Weight	Arm length	Hand span	Wingspan	40-yard dash	10-yard split	20-yard split	20-yard shuttle	Three-cone drill	Vertical jump	Broad jump	Bench press
6 ft 6 1/4 in (1.99 m)	323 lb (147 kg)	35 1/2 in (0.90 m)	10 3/8 in (0.26 m)	6 ft 10 7/8 in (2.11 m)	5.27 s	1.89 s	3.09 s	4.81 s	7.84 s	26.0 in (0.66 m)	8 ft 4 in (2.54 m)	25 reps
All values from NFL Combine

He was selected by the New York Giants in the fourth round of the 2011 NFL draft with the 117th overall pick. Despite making the Giants 53-man roster out of training camp for the 2011 season, Brewer was a gameday inactive for all 16 regular season games.

Brewer signed a one-year contract with the New York Jets on March 19, 2015. He was waived on August 30, 2015.
