= Indianapolis Public School Conference =

Athletic conference in Indiana, United States

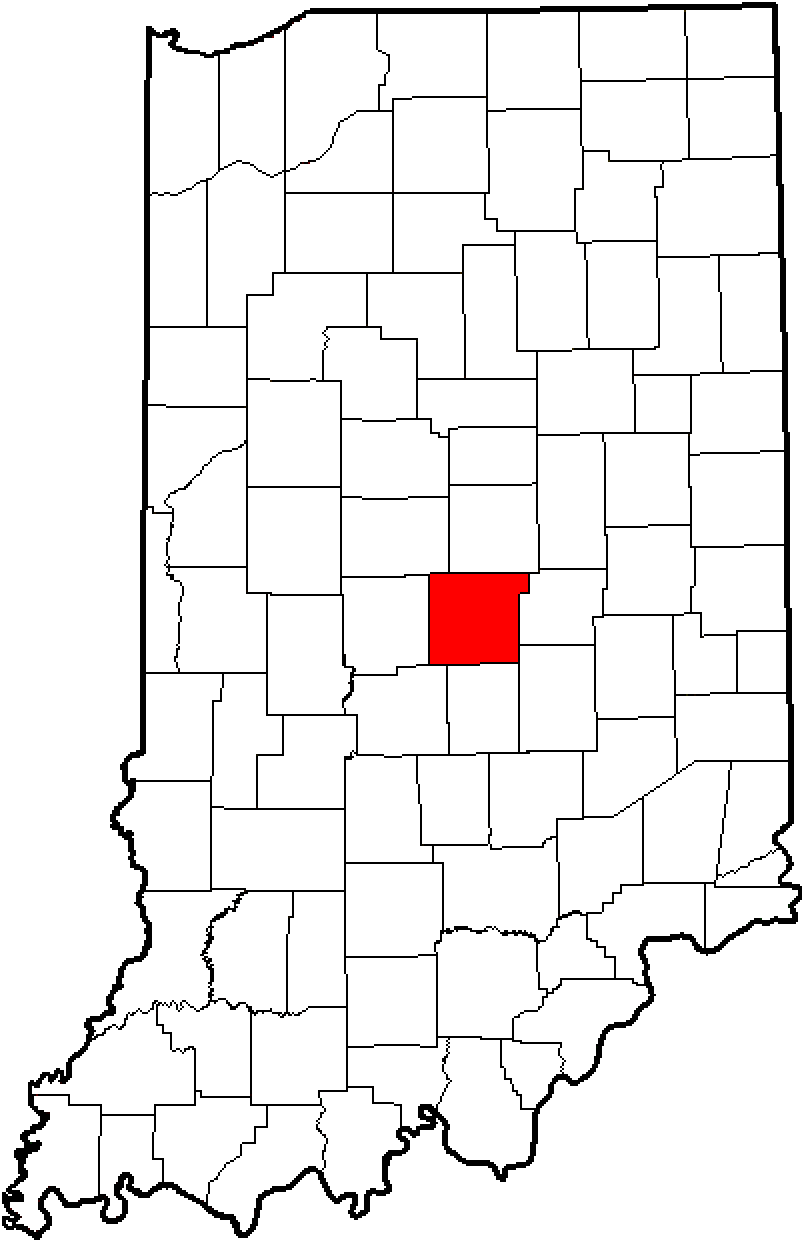
The Indiana Public Schools Conference in Indiana

The Indianapolis Public Schools Athletic Conference was an athletic conference consisting of high schools in the Indianapolis Public Schools district. The demise of the conference came in 2018, as four of the seven remaining schools closed in a span of two years, leaving only three schools left, one of which (Howe) is a charter school, and another (Manual) under state control (IPS has stated those two schools will close if returned to school board control). Instead, those two schools joined the Greater Indianapolis Conference, leaving George Washington as an independent.

== Membership ==
School	Mascot	Colors	Year joined	Previous conference	Year left	Conference joined
Indianapolis; Broad Ripple	Rockets		1927	Independents	2018	none (school closed)
Indianapolis; Manual	Redskins		1927	Independents	2018	Greater Indianapolis
Indianapolis; Shortridge^{1}	Blue Devils		1927	Independents	1981	school closed
Indianapolis; Washington^{2, 3}	Continentals		1927; 1941; 2003	none (new school); South Central none (school reopened)	1937; 1995; 2018	South Central none (school closed); Independents
Indianapolis; Howe^{2}	Hornets		1938; 2003	none (new school) none (school reopened)	1995; 2018	none (school closed); Greater Indianapolis
Indianapolis; Crispus Attucks	Tigers		1955; 2003	Independents none (school reopened)	1986; 2009	none (school closed); Pioneer
Indianapolis; Wood	Woodchucks		1955	none (new school)	1978	none (school closed)
Indianapolis; Arsenal Tech	Titans		1960	North Central	2013	Independents (NCC 2015)
Indianapolis; Arlington	Golden Knights		1961	none (new school)	2018	none (school closed)
Indianapolis; Northwest	Space Pioneers		1963	none (new school)	2018	none (school closed)
Indianapolis; Marshall^{4}	Patriots		1967; 2009	none (new school) none (school reopened)	1986; 2017	none (school closed) none (school closed)

1. Shortridge was closed as a high school between 1981 and 2009. When it reopened as a magnet school, instead of joining the IPS conference, the school joined the Pioneer Conference along with Attucks due to their smaller enrollments and specialized programs compared to other IPS schools.
2. Howe and Washington were closed as high schools from 1995 to 2003.
3. Washington played in the SCC from 1937 to 1943.
4. Marshall was closed as a high school from 1986 to 2009, then reopened.
