= Joseph J. Bingham Indianapolis Public School No. 84 =

- Joseph J. Bingham Indianapolis Public School No. 84, Center for Inquiry
- U.S. National Register of Historic Places
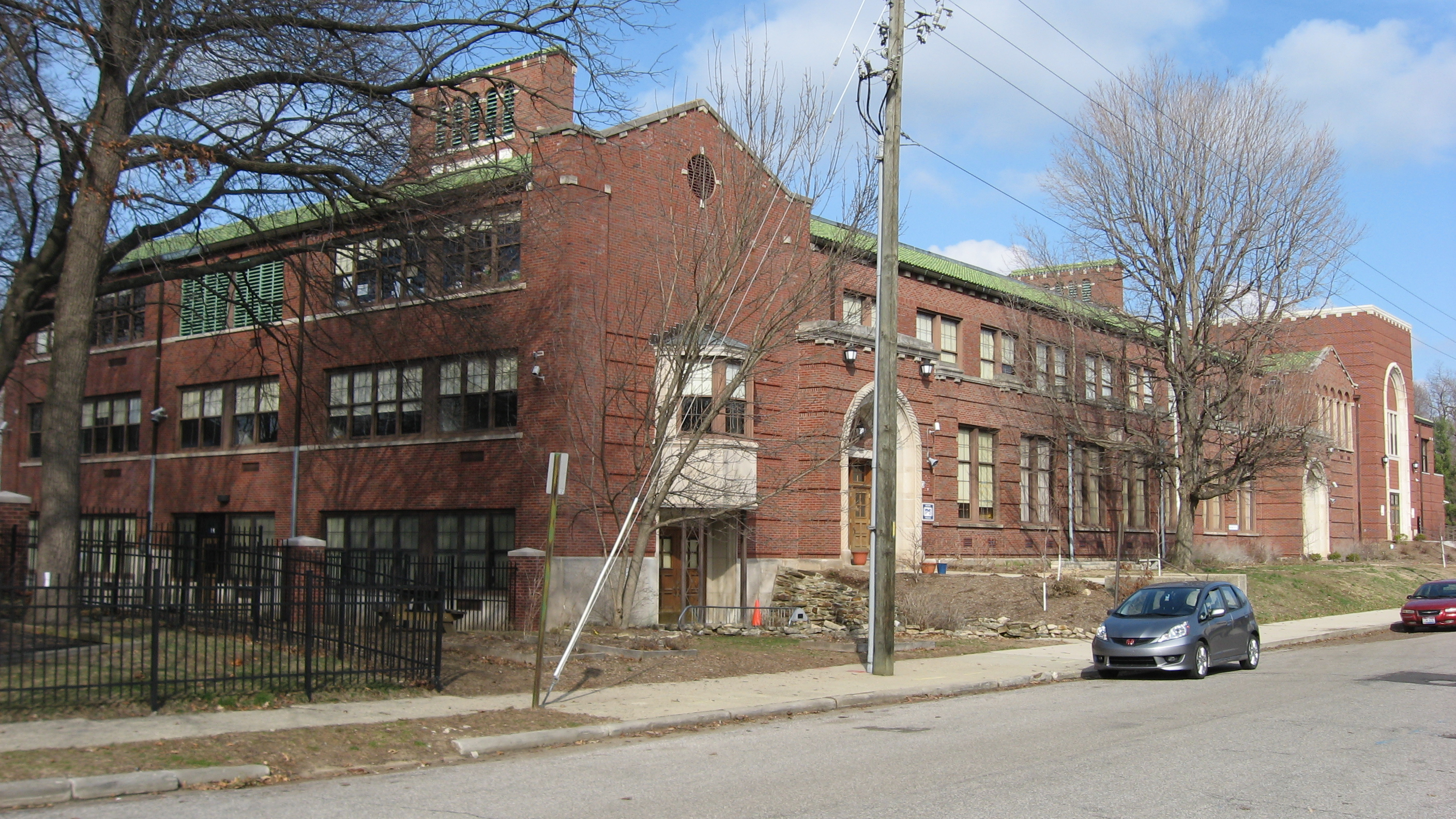
- Joseph J. Bingham Indianapolis Public School No. 84 Center for Inquiry, March 2011

- Location within Indianapolis Location within Indiana Location within the United States
- Location: 440 E. 57th St.-5702 Central Ave., Indianapolis, Indiana
- Coordinates: 39°51′34″N 86°9′5″W
- Area: less than one acre
- Built: 1927-1928
- Architect: Kopf, J. Edwin, & Deery
- Architectural style: Mission/spanish Revival
- MPS: Public School Buildings in Indianapolis Built Before 1940 MPS
- NRHP reference No.: 04001310
- Added to NRHP: December 6, 2004

Joseph J. Bingham Indianapolis Public School No. 84 Center for Inquiry is a historic elementary school building owned and operated by Indianapolis Public Schools in Indianapolis, Indiana. It was built in 1927–1928 as a two-story, Mission Revival style building on a raised basement. It is of reinforced concrete construction sheathed in red brick with limestone detailing. It has a green clay barrel tile, side gabled roof.

A three-story wing was added to the western side of the building in 1955, containing a school library and an art room on the upper level, two classrooms on the main level, and a kitchen, cafeteria, and music room on the ground level. A renovation and second expansion, beginning in 2007, added another three-story wing to the eastern side of the building. The new wing included additional classrooms for art, music, and science, a new gymnasium, a new cafeteria, staff offices, and provided air conditioning throughout the building. The former gymnasium was converted into a new library and media center.

In 1994 and again in 1997, School 84 was chosen among other elementary schools proposed for closure. These included nearby Schools No. 70 and No. 86. The reasons cited for closure included declining enrollment, proximity of other elementary schools, and building age. Due to parent and community feedback, the establishment of School No. 70 as a Center for Inquiry, and the closing of School No. 86, School No. 84 remained open.

School No. 84 operated as an elementary school serving grades K–5 until the 2006–2007 school year, when it was reestablished as the Joseph J. Bingham School No. 84 Center for Inquiry, becoming the second Center for Inquiry magnet school within Indianapolis Public Schools. Since 2008, School No. 84 has been serving children in grades K–8.

It was added to the National Register of Historic Places in 2004.

== See also ==
- Indianapolis Public Schools
- National Register of Historic Places listings in Marion County, Indiana
