= Charter Schools USA =

US education management organization

Coordinates: 26.2061°N 80.1373°W

- Type: Education management organization
- Founded: 1997; 29 years ago
- Headquarters: 800 Corporate Drive, Suite 700, Fort Lauderdale, FL 33334
- Website: www.charterschoolsusa.com

Charter Schools USA (CSUSA) is a for-profit education management organization in the United States. It operates eighty-seven schools in seven states including sixty one charter schools in Florida. In 2019, Charter Schools USA managed charter schools enrolling approximately 70,000 students on a vendor operated school basis.

CSUSA management-run schools are tuition-free to the parent. Students must wear uniforms and parental involvement is required. Teachers are paid for performance and teach a standard curriculum that includes music, art, sciences and customary classes. Charter Schools USA manages every aspect of the program from marketing for new students, teacher recruitment, curriculum development, equipment and book ordering to financial management and oversight.

== History ==
CSUSA was founded in 1997 by Jonathan Hage, a former U.S. Army Green Beret and researcher at The Heritage Foundation.

CSUSA is the first education management company to earn corporation system-wide accreditation through AdvancED. CSUSA shares its headquarters address with Florida Charter Educational Foundation, the holder of the charter for six of CSUSA's schools.

== Affiliations ==
Charter Schools USA aligns with a number of associations and organizations. Some of the educational reform organizations that CSUSA aligns with are:

- Red Apple Development, LLC
- Florida Charter School Alliance
- National Alliance for Public Charter Schools
- National Association of Charter School Authorizers
- The Center for Education Reform

=== Florida ===
- Aventura City of Excellence School
- Bonita Springs Charter School
- Canoe Creek Charter Academy
- Coral Springs Charter School
- Clay Charter Academy
- Creekside Charter Academy
- Cherry Lake Preparatory Academy
- Discovery High School
- Don Soffer Aventura High School
- Downtown Miami Charter School
- Duval Charter Scholars Academy
- Duval Charter School at Arlington
- Duval Charter High School at Baymeadows
- Duval Charter School at Baymeadows
- Duval Charter School at Flagler Center
- Duval Charter School at Mandarin
- Duval Charter School at Southside
- Duval Charter School at Westside
- Four Corners Charter School
- Four Corners Upper School
- G-Star School of the Arts
- Gateway Charter High School
- Gateway Charter School
- Governors Charter Academy
- Henderson Hammock Charter School
- Hollywood Academy of Arts & Science
- iVirtual League Academy
- Keys Gate Charter School
- Keys Gate Charter High School
- Manatee Charter School
- Mid Cape Global Academy
- North Broward Academy of Excellence
- Palms West Charter School
- PM Wells Charter Academy
- Renaissance Charter School at Central Palm
- Renaissance Charter School at Chickasaw Trail
- Renaissance Charter School at Cooper City
- Renaissance Charter School at Coral Springs
- Renaissance Charter School at Cypress
- Renaissance Charter School at Goldenrod
- Renaissance Charter School at Hunter’s Creek
- Renaissance Charter School at Palms West
- Renaissance Charter School at Pembroke Pines
- Renaissance Charter School at Pines
- Renaissance Charter School at Plantation
- Renaissance Charter School at Poinciana
- Renaissance Charter School of Saint Lucie
- Renaissance Charter School at Summit
- Renaissance Charter School at Tapestry
- Renaissance Charter School at Tradition
- Renaissance Charter School at University
- Renaissance Charter School at Wellington
- Renaissance Charter School at West Palm Beach
- Renaissance Charter Elementary School at Doral
- Renaissance Charter Middle School at Doral
- Innovation Repertory Academy of South Fort Myers
- Southshore Charter Academy
- Tradition Preparatory High School
- Union Park Charter Academy
- Waterset Charter School
- Winthrop Charter School
- Winthrop College Preparatory Academy
- Woodmont Charter School

=== Georgia ===
- Cherokee Charter Academy
- Coweta Charter Academy

=== Illinois ===
- CICS Larry Hawkins
- CICS Lloyd Bond
- CICS Longwood
- CICS Loomis Primary

=== Indiana ===
CSUSA was nominated by the state in 2012 to turn over three failing schools in Indianapolis. The three schools were Thomas Carr Howe Community High School, Emmerich Manual High School, and Emma Donnan Middle School. The schools were given over on a performance contract, which granted Charter Schools USA four years to improve, which was later extended to 2022. Upon the arrival of the second renewal date for CSUSA's contract in June of 2022, Indianapolis Public Schools opposed the renewal of operator's contract, citing academic and financial concerns.

CSUSA's contract was not renewed, and control of the schools was turned over to IPS, which then closed Thomas Carr Howe Community High School and reassigned operation of Emma Donnan Elementary and Middle School and Emmerich Manual High School to local charter operators Adelante Schools and Christel House Indianapolis, respectively. IPS Board Commissioner Diane Arnold, stated issues with CSUSA's leadership, high teacher turnover rate and a lack of communication.

The turnaround process was first put into motion by a 1999 law, which said schools with student standardized test scores in the lowest category for five straight years could face intervention from the State Board of Education.

- Emma Donnan Elementary and Middle School
- Emmerich Manual High School
- Thomas Carr Howe Community High School

=== Louisiana ===
- Acadiana Renaissance Charter Academy
- Baton Rouge Charter Academy at Mid City
- Iberville Charter Academy
- Lake Charles Charter Academy
- Lake Charles College Prep
- Louisiana Renaissance Charter Academy
- Magnolia School of Excellence
- South Baton Rouge Charter Academy
- Southwest Louisiana Charter Academy

=== Michigan ===
- Success Mile Charter Academy

=== North Carolina ===
- Cabarrus Charter Academy
- Cardinal Charter Academy at Cary
- Cardinal Charter Academy at Wendell Falls
- Langtree Charter Academy
- Langtree Charter Upper School
- Kannapolis Charter Academy
- Iredell Charter Academy
- Indian Trail Union Preparatory Academy

=== South Carolina ===
- Berkeley Preparatory Academy
- Mevers School of Excellence
