= 1969–70 Ohio State Buckeyes men's basketball team =

American college basketball season

1969–70 Ohio State Buckeyes men's basketball
- Conference: Big Ten Conference
- Record: 15–9 (8–6 Big Ten)
- Head coach: Fred Taylor (12th season)
- Home arena: St. John Arena

1969–70 Big Ten Conference men's basketball standings
	Conf.				Overall
Team	W		L	PCT	W		L	PCT
No. 7 Iowa	14	–	0	1.000	20	–	5	.800
Purdue	11	–	3	.786	18	–	6	.750
Ohio State	8	–	6	.571	15	–	9	.625
Illinois	8	–	6	.571	15	–	9	.625
Minnesota	7	–	7	.500	13	–	11	.542
Michigan	5	–	9	.357	10	–	14	.417
Wisconsin	5	–	9	.357	10	–	14	.417
Michigan State	5	–	9	.357	9	–	15	.375
Northwestern	4	–	10	.286	9	–	15	.375
Indiana	3	–	11	.214	7	–	17	.292
Rankings from AP Poll

The 1969–70 Ohio State Buckeyes men's basketball team represented Ohio State University during the 1969–70 NCAA University Division men's basketball season. Led by 12th-year head coach Fred Taylor, the Buckeyes finished 15–9 (8–6 Big Ten).

== Roster ==
1969–70 Ohio State Buckeyes men's basketball team
Players	Coaches
Pos. / # / Name / Height / Weight / Year / Hometown; G / 35 / Jim Cleamons / 6 ft 3 in (1.91 m) / 185 lb (84 kg) / Jr	Head coach: Fred Taylor (Ohio State); Assistant coach(es) Legend: (C) Team captain; (S) Suspended; (I) Ineligible; (W) Walk-on; Injured; Current redshirt

== Schedule/results ==
Date time, TV	Rank^{#}	Opponent^{#}	Result	Record	High points	High rebounds	High assists	Site (attendance) city, state
Regular Season
*Non-conference game. ^{#}Rankings from AP Poll. (#) Tournament seedings in parentheses.
