= Dave Blase =

American cyclist

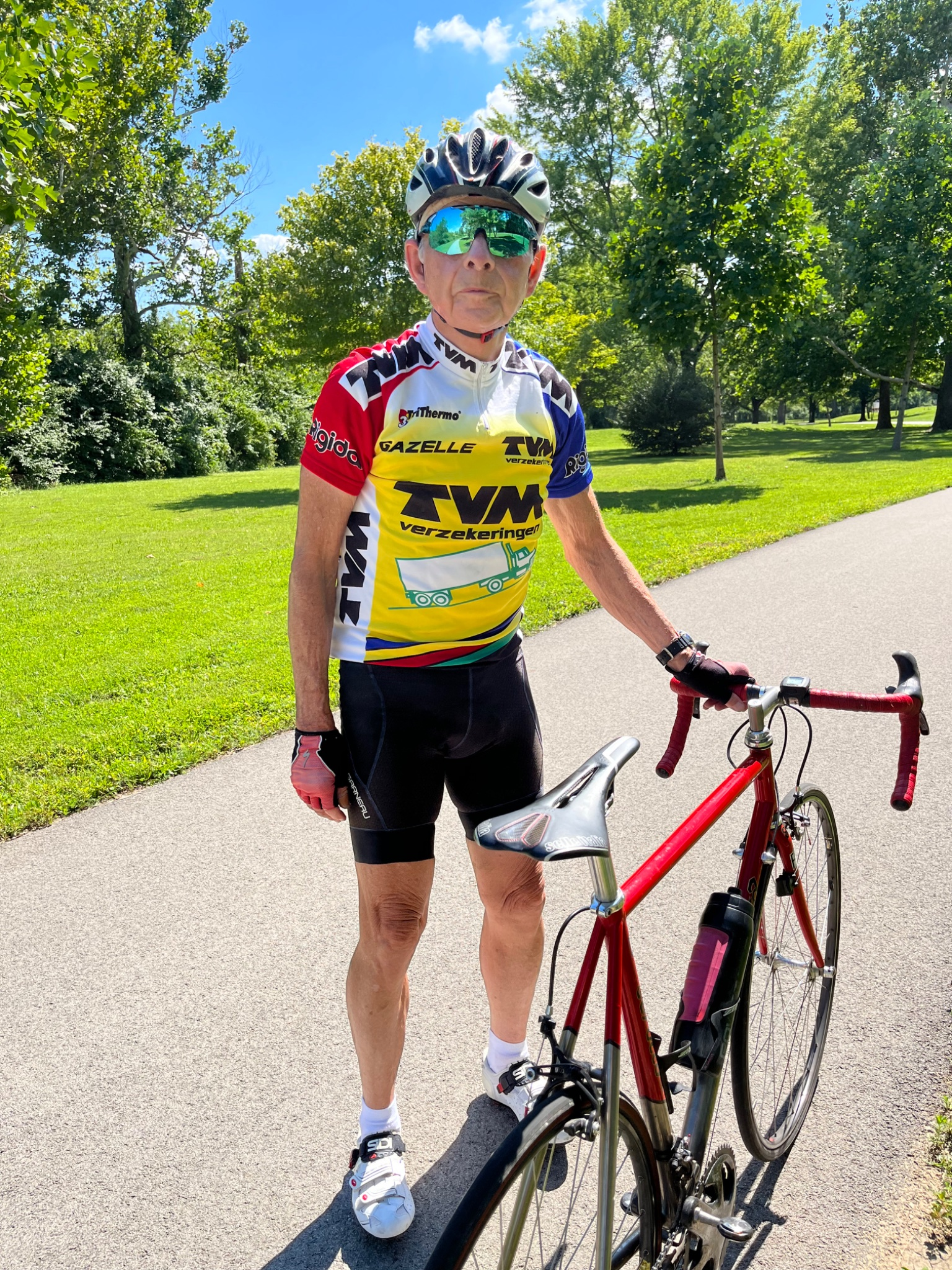
Dave Blase at 83 in Indianapolis, IN

Dave Blase is an American cyclist whose story served as the inspiration for the film Breaking Away.

== Little 500 ==
Blase attended Indiana University Bloomington in Bloomington, Indiana from 1958 to 1962. In his freshman year, he started cycling and joined a team for the Little 500 bike race. He quickly became a dominant rider and was recruited by the Phi Kappa Psi fraternity. However, eligibility rules for the race were changed to require transferring team members to sit out one year. Blase continued to ride in outside races waiting to become eligible to ride for Phi Kappa Psi, a move which precluded him from competing the following year when a new rule was enacted requiring those who participated in outside races to wait one year to become eligible. Blase spent that year off campus and returned to ride in the 1962 Little 500. Blase led Phi Kappa Psi to a victory, riding 139 of the 200 laps himself.

== Breaking Away ==
Breaking Away was written by Steve Tesich, an Indiana University graduate who served as an alternate rider on the Phi Kappa Psi Little 500 Team in 1962. He was teammates with Blase and used him as an inspiration for the Dave Stohler character in the film, and for the overall story. Like Blase, the Stohler character developed an appreciation for Italian culture and the Italian cycling team.

== After Indiana University ==
Blase cycled professionally after leaving college and became a high school biology teacher in Indianapolis, at Thomas Carr Howe Community High School and Arlington High School.
