= John Johnson (basketball, born 1947) =

American basketball player (1947–2016)

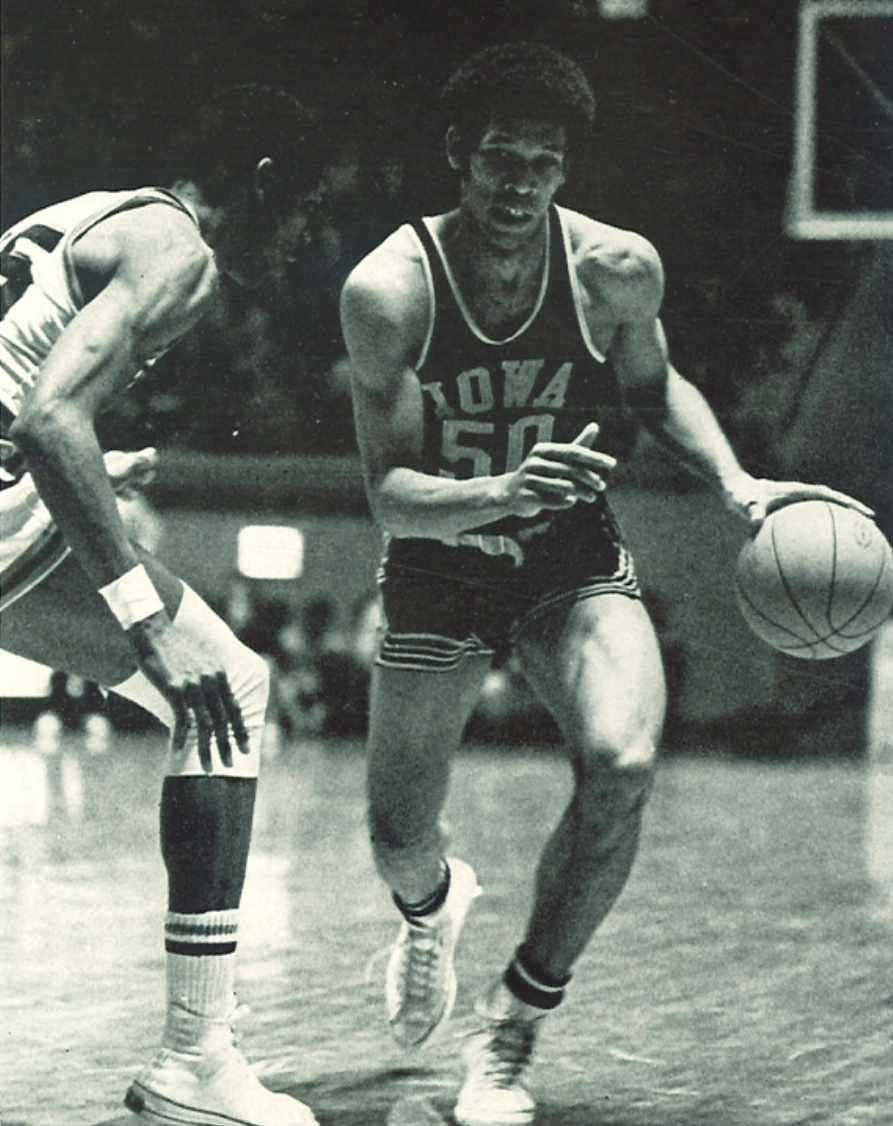
- Johnson with the Iowa Hawkeyes, c. 1970

Personal information
- Born: October 18, 1947 Carthage, Mississippi, U.S.
- Died: January 7, 2016 (aged 68) San Jose, California, U.S.
- Listed height: 6 ft 7 in (2.01 m)
- Listed weight: 200 lb (91 kg)

Career information
- High school: Messmer (Milwaukee, Wisconsin)
- College: Northwest College (1966–1968); Iowa (1968–1970)
- NBA draft: 1970: 1st round, 7th overall pick
- Drafted by: Cleveland Cavaliers
- Playing career: 1970–1982
- Position: Small forward
- Number: 32, 27, 34

Career history
- 1970–1973: Cleveland Cavaliers
- 1973–1975: Portland Trail Blazers
- 1975–1977: Houston Rockets
- 1977–1982: Seattle SuperSonics

Career highlights
- NBA champion (1979); 2× NBA All-Star (1971, 1972); Third-team All-American – UPI (1970); First-team All-Big Ten (1970)

Career statistics
- Points: 11,200 (12.9 ppg)
- Rebounds: 4,778 (5.5 rpg)
- Assists: 3,285 (3.8 apg)
- Stats at NBA.com
- Stats at Basketball Reference

John Howard Getty "J. J." Johnson (October 18, 1947 – January 7, 2016) was an American professional basketball player. He played college basketball for the Iowa Hawkeyes.

== High school and college career ==
Johnson played high school basketball at Messmer High School in Milwaukee, Wisconsin. As a senior, he helped lead Messmer to the Wisconsin state title in 1966.

Johnson, a 6’7" small forward, then played for Northwest College in Powell, Wyoming and for the University of Iowa. He set an Iowa record for points in a season during his senior year, when he averaged 27.9 points per game. Johnson also holds Iowa's top two scoring performances with 49 and 46 points. Johnson played two seasons for Iowa, leading the team in scoring and rebounding both seasons. Johnson, accompanied by later Seattle SuperSonics teammate Fred Brown, guided Iowa to a 14–0 Big Ten record and NCAA tournament berth in 1970.

== Professional career ==
Johnson was selected by the Cleveland Cavaliers with the 7th pick of the 1970 NBA draft. Johnson was also selected in the 1970 ABA Draft by the Dallas Chaparrals before the team briefly became the Texas Chaparrals for the following season. He was the first Cavaliers player to play in an NBA All Star Game. As a member of the Houston Rockets, he would be the last to wear #34 years before the arrival of Hakeem Olajuwon.

In 1977, Johnson was traded to the Seattle SuperSonics and was reunited with former Iowa Hawkeye teammate Fred Brown. Johnson was a key contributor for Seattle, who went to the NBA Finals in 1977–78 and won an NBA championship in 1978–79 while possibly becoming the first point forward in league history as he was the player who more often set the plays for the Sonics rather than their star guards Dennis Johnson and Gus Williams.

Overall, Johnson had a productive 12-year NBA career with four teams, making two NBA All-Star Game appearances and scoring 11,200 career points. He ended his NBA career in Seattle in the early 1980s.

== Later years ==
Johnson moved from Seattle to San Jose when his son Mitch was recruited to play for Stanford. His son played on the Stanford University basketball team from 2005 to 2008, and is currently the head coach of the San Antonio Spurs in the NBA. On January 7, 2016, at age 68, Johnson died in his San Jose residence of undetermined cause.

== Career statistics ==
Legend
GP	Games played	GS	Games started	MPG	Minutes per game
FG%	Field goal percentage	3P%	3-point field goal percentage	FT%	Free throw percentage
RPG	Rebounds per game	APG	Assists per game	SPG	Steals per game
BPG	Blocks per game	PPG	Points per game	**Bold**	Career high
†	Won an NBA championship	*	Led the league

=== NBA ===
==== Regular season ====
Year	Team	GP	GS	MPG	FG%	3P%	FT%	RPG	APG	SPG	BPG	PPG
1970–71	Cleveland	67		34.5	.422		.805	6.8	4.8			16.6
1971–72	Cleveland	**82**		**37.1**	.433		.785	**7.7**	5.1			**17.0**
1972–73	Cleveland	**82***		34.3	.430		.734	6.7	3.8			14.4
1973–74	Portland	69		33.1	.464		.812	7.5	4.1	**1.0**	.4	16.4
1974–75	Portland	80		31.8	.487		.784	6.3	3.0	.9	.5	16.1
1975–76	Portland	9		23.6	.466		**.852**	4.4	2.2	.8	**.9**	11.7
1975–76	Houston	67		22.2	.452		.758	4.4	2.9	.7	.4	9.7
1976–77	Houston	79		22.0	.458		.712	3.4	2.3	.6	.3	9.3
1977–78	Houston	1		11.0	.250		.667	3.0	1.0	.0	.0	4.0
1977–78	Seattle	76		23.8	.416		.753	4.0	2.8	.6	.3	10.7
1978–79†	Seattle	**82***	**82**	29.1	.434		.760	5.0	4.4	.7	.3	11.0
1979–80	Seattle	81		31.3	.488	–	.801	5.3	**5.2**	.9	.4	11.3
1980–81	Seattle	80		29.1	.431	.000	.808	4.5	3.9	.7	.3	11.5
1981–82	Seattle	14	1	13.4	**.489**	–	.750	1.3	2.1	.3	.2	4.2
Career		869	83	29.6	.446	.000	.779	5.5	3.8	.8	.4	12.9
All-Star		2	0	2.5	.000		–	.5	.5			.0

==== Playoffs ====
Year	Team	GP	MPG	FG%	3P%	FT%	RPG	APG	SPG	BPG	PPG
1977	Houston	12	12.2	.393		.667	2.4	.8	.3	.0	4.8
1978	Seattle	**22***	27.1	.424		.696	4.5	2.5	.4	**.3**	10.1
1979†	Seattle	17	**36.2**	.474		.641	**6.8**	5.4	**1.0**	.2	12.2
1980	Seattle	15	32.4	**.494**	.000	**.811**	**6.8**	**5.7**	.5	.2	**12.4**
1982	Seattle	7	22.7	.395		.727	2.0	4.9	.9	.0	5.4
Career		73	27.4	.450	.000	.699	4.9	3.8	.6	.2	9.7
