= 1969–70 Princeton Tigers men's basketball team =

American college basketball season

1969–70 Princeton Tigers men's basketball
- Conference: Ivy League
- Record: 16–9 (9–5, 3rd Ivy)
- Head coach: Pete Carril
- Captains: John Hummer; Geoff Petrie
- Home arena: Jadwin Gymnasium

The 1969–70 Princeton Tigers men's basketball team represented Princeton University in intercollegiate college basketball during the 1969–70 NCAA University Division men's basketball season. The head coach was Pete Carril and the team co-captains were John Hummer and Geoff Petrie. The team played its home games in the Jadwin Gymnasium on the university campus in Princeton, New Jersey. The team finished third in the Ivy League and did not participate in either the postseason 1970 National Invitation Tournament or the 1970 NCAA Men's Division I Basketball Tournament. The team helped Princeton end the decade with a 72.6 winning percentage (188–71), which was the tenth best in the nation.

During the regular season, the team played a few of the teams that would eventually participate in the 25-team NCAA tournament: Villanova and eventual champion UCLA as well as conference rival Penn twice. The team's schedule included victories over Maryland and Indiana. The team posted a 16–9 overall record and a 9–5 conference record.

Although Hummer repeated as an All-Ivy League first team selection, Petrie failed to do so and was a second team selection. However, Petrie was a third team All-American selection by the Basketball News and repeated as an All-East selection. Petrie and Hummer were the only Tiger teammates to both be drafted in the first round of the NBA draft (in the same draft no less) when they were selected eighth and fifteenth overall in the 1970 NBA draft by the Portland Trail Blazers and the Buffalo Braves. The two were part of a trio of 1970 NBA first-round draftees from the Ivy League that included number thirteen selection Jim McMillian of Columbia. Hummer was the first NBA draft pick by the expansion Buffalo Braves. Petrie would share the 1971 NBA Rookie of the Year Award with Dave Cowens. Brian Taylor was selected in the 1972 NBA draft by the Seattle SuperSonics with the 23rd overall selection in the second round while Reggie Bird was selected by the Atlanta Hawks with the 55th overall selection in the fourth round. Ted Manakas was also selected by the Hawks with the 36th overall selection in the third round of the 1973 NBA draft.

== Players drafted into the NBA ==
Five players from this team were selected in the NBA draft.

Year	Round	Pick	Player	NBA club
1970	1	8	Geoff Petrie	Portland Trail Blazers
1970	1	15	John Hummer	Buffalo Braves
1972	2	23	Brian Taylor	Seattle SuperSonics
1972	4	55	Reggie Bird	Atlanta Hawks
1973	3	36	Ted Manakas	Atlanta Hawks
