= 1969–70 Illinois Fighting Illini men's basketball team =

American college basketball season

1969–70 Illinois Fighting Illini men's basketball
- Conference: Big Ten Conference
- Record: 15–9 (8–6 Big Ten)
- Head coach: Harv Schmidt (3rd season)
- Assistant coaches: Dick Campbell (3rd season); Jim Wright (11th season)
- MVP: Mike Price
- Captains: Mike Price; Randy Crews
- Home arena: Assembly Hall

1969–70 Big Ten Conference men's basketball standings
	Conf.				Overall
Team	W		L	PCT	W		L	PCT
No. 7 Iowa	14	–	0	1.000	20	–	5	.800
Purdue	11	–	3	.786	18	–	6	.750
Ohio State	8	–	6	.571	15	–	9	.625
Illinois	8	–	6	.571	15	–	9	.625
Minnesota	7	–	7	.500	13	–	11	.542
Michigan	5	–	9	.357	10	–	14	.417
Wisconsin	5	–	9	.357	10	–	14	.417
Michigan State	5	–	9	.357	9	–	15	.375
Northwestern	4	–	10	.286	9	–	15	.375
Indiana	3	–	11	.214	7	–	17	.292
Rankings from AP Poll

The 1969–70 Illinois Fighting Illini men's basketball team represented the University of Illinois.

== Regular season ==
The 1969-70 basketball season for head coach Harv Schmidt saw his team enter the collegiate top 25 rankings in December, only to fall back off the chart in February. The team was led in scoring for the season by Greg Jackson, Mike Price and Rick Howat. Price would finish his senior season by being named on the Converse honorable mention All-American team. The Fighting Illini would go on to finish the season with a 15-9 overall record and tied for 3rd place in the conference with an 8–6 record.

The 1969-70 team's starting lineup included Randy Crews and Fred Miller at the forward spots, Price and Howat as guards and Jackson at center.

=== Roster ===
1969–70 Illinois Fighting Illini men's basketball team
Players
Coaches

Pos.	#	Name	Height	Weight	Year	Previous school	Hometown
G	10	Rick Howat	6 ft 2 in (1.88 m)	160 lb (73 kg)	Jr	Downers Grove North High School	Downers Grove, Illinois
G	11	Bob Windmiller	6 ft 0 in (1.83 m)	180 lb (82 kg)	Jr	Ossian High School	Ossian, Indiana
F	14	Fred Miller	6 ft 4 in (1.93 m)	205 lb (93 kg)	Jr	Pekin High School	Pekin, Illinois
G/F	15	Mike Price (C)	6 ft 3 in (1.91 m)	200 lb (91 kg)	Sr	Arsenal Technical High School	Indianapolis, Indiana
C	24	Larry Dykstra	6 ft 7 in (2.01 m)	205 lb (93 kg)	So	Guilford High School	Rockford, Illinois
G	25	Jim Krelle	6 ft 3 in (1.91 m)	180 lb (82 kg)	So	Aurora West High School	Aurora, Illinois
F	30	Randy Crews (C)	6 ft 5 in (1.96 m)	240 lb (109 kg)	Sr	Bradley-Bourbonnais Community High School	Kankakee, Illinois
C	31	Greg Jackson	6 ft 8 in (2.03 m)	255 lb (116 kg)	Jr	St. Philip High School	Chicago, Illinois
G	32	Sam Scaletta	6 ft 0 in (1.83 m)	170 lb (77 kg)	So	Eisenhower High School	Blue Island, Illinois
F	40	Tom Dezort	6 ft 6 in (1.98 m)	190 lb (86 kg)	So	Edwardsville High School	Edwardsville, Illinois
C	42	Doug Faulds	6 ft 6 in (1.98 m)	195 lb (88 kg)	So	Lyons Township High School	LaGrange Park, Illinois
G	43	Bob Shapland	6 ft 2 in (1.88 m)	185 lb (84 kg)	Jr	Central High School	Champaign, Illinois

Head coach

- Harv Schmidt (University of Illinois) (3rd year)

Assistant coach(es)

- Dick Campbell (3rd year)
- Jim Wright (University of Illinois) (11th year)

Legend

- (C) Team captain
- (S) Suspended
- (I) Ineligible
- (W) Walk-on
- Injured
- Current redshirt

Roster

== Schedule ==
Date time, TV	Rank^{#}	Opponent^{#}	Result	Record	Site (attendance) city, state
Non-Conference regular season
12/2/1969*		Butler	W 83-67	1 - 0	Assembly Hall (13,752); Champaign, IL
12/6/1969*		at Georgia	W 81-70	2 - 0	Stegeman Coliseum (6,271); Athens, GA
12/8/1969*		DePauw	W 91-57	3 - 0	Assembly Hall (13,367); Champaign, IL
12/13/1969*		Creighton	W 57-51	4 - 0	Assembly Hall (6,000); Champaign, IL
12/18/1969*		Detroit	W 82-65	5 - 0	Assembly Hall (6,251); Champaign, IL
12/20/1969*		vs. Wichita State	W 66-63	6 - 0	Chicago Stadium (5,240); Chicago, IL
12/20/1969*	No. 15	at Washington State	L 58-59	6-1	Bohler Gymnasium (13,000); Pullman, WA
12/29/1969*	No. 15	vs. Michigan State; Far West Classic	W 86-77	7-1	Veterans Memorial Coliseum (6,873); Portland, OR
12/30/1969*		vs. No. 19 Southern California; Far West Classic	L 62-65	7-2	Veterans Memorial Coliseum (6,324); Portland, OR
Big Ten regular season
1/3/1970		at Wisconsin	W 74-69	8 - 2 (1 - 0)	Wisconsin Field House (5,411); Madison, WI
1/6/1970		Indiana; Rivalry	W 94-74	9 - 2 (2 - 0)	Assembly Hall (15,392); Champaign, IL
1/10/1970		Ohio State	W 77-59	10 - 2 (3 - 0)	Assembly Hall (16,128); Champaign, IL
1/13/1970	No. 17	at Northwestern; Rivalry	W 101-80	11 - 2 (4 - 0)	McGaw Memorial Hall (7,677); Evanston, IL
1/17/1970	No. 17	at Michigan	W 75-73	12 - 2 (5 - 0)	Crisler Center (8,405); Ann Arbor, MI
1/31/1970*	No. 10	vs. Notre Dame	L 83-86	12 - 3	Chicago Stadium (15,864); Chicago, IL
2/3/1970	No. 14	Wisconsin	L 65-66	12 - 4 (5 - 1)	Assembly Hall (14,217); Champaign, IL
2/7/1970	No. 14	at Minnesota	L 73-82	12 - 5 (5 - 2)	Williams Arena (12,519); Minneapolis, MN
2/14/1970		at Purdue	L 49-83	12 - 6 (5 - 3)	Mackey Arena (14,123); West Lafayette, IN
2/17/1970		No. 11 Iowa; Rivalry	L 81-83	12 - 7 (5 - 4)	Assembly Hall (16,128); Champaign, IL
2/21/1970		Purdue	L 81-88	12 - 8 (5 - 5)	Assembly Hall (16,128); Champaign, IL
2/24/1970		at Michigan State	W 74-67	13 - 8 (6 - 5)	Jenison Fieldhouse (6,417); East Lansing, MI
2/28/1970		Minnesota	W 75-73	14 - 8 (7 - 5)	Assembly Hall (16,128); Champaign, IL
3/3/1970		at Indiana; Rivalry	W 85-75	15 - 8 (8 - 5)	New Fieldhouse (5,196); Bloomington, IN
3/7/1970		Michigan State	L 76-81	15 - 9 (8 - 6)	Assembly Hall (16,128); Champaign, IL
*Non-conference game. ^{#}Rankings from AP Poll. (#) Tournament seedings in parentheses. All times are in Central Time.

== Player stats ==
Player	Games played	Field goals	Free throws	Rebounds	Points
Greg Jackson	24	175	59	234	409
Mike Price	24	135	89	220	359
Rick Howat	24	147	41	66	335
Fred Miller	24	107	79	138	293
Randy Crews	23	77	47	142	201
Bob Windmiller	21	56	15	37	127
Tom Dezort	15	15	6	21	36
Bob Shapland	21	8	18	25	34
Jim Krelle	13	10	3	14	23

== Awards and honors ==
- Rick Howat
  - Team Most Valuable Player
- Mike Price
  - Honorable Mention All-American (Converse)

== Team players drafted into the NBA ==
Player	NBA club	Round	Pick
Mike Price	New York Knicks	1	17
