= 1969–70 Wisconsin Badgers men's basketball team =

American college basketball season

1969–70 Wisconsin Badgers men's basketball
- Conference: Big Ten Conference
- Record: 10–14 (5–9 Big Ten)
- Head coach: John Powless (2nd season)
- Home arena: UW Fieldhouse

1969–70 Big Ten Conference men's basketball standings
| | Conf. | | | | Overall |
| Team | W | | L | PCT | W | | L | PCT |
|---|---|---|---|---|---|---|---|---|
| No. 7 Iowa | 14 | – | 0 | 1.000 | 20 | – | 5 | .800 |
| Purdue | 11 | – | 3 | .786 | 18 | – | 6 | .750 |
| Ohio State | 8 | – | 6 | .571 | 15 | – | 9 | .625 |
| Illinois | 8 | – | 6 | .571 | 15 | – | 9 | .625 |
| Minnesota | 7 | – | 7 | .500 | 13 | – | 11 | .542 |
| Michigan | 5 | – | 9 | .357 | 10 | – | 14 | .417 |
| Wisconsin | 5 | – | 9 | .357 | 10 | – | 14 | .417 |
| Michigan State | 5 | – | 9 | .357 | 9 | – | 15 | .375 |
| Northwestern | 4 | – | 10 | .286 | 9 | – | 15 | .375 |
| Indiana | 3 | – | 11 | .214 | 7 | – | 17 | .292 |
Rankings from AP Poll

The 1969–70 Wisconsin Badgers men's basketball team represented University of Wisconsin–Madison. The head coach was John Powless, coaching his second season with the Badgers. The team played their home games at the UW Fieldhouse in Madison, Wisconsin and was a member of the Big Ten Conference.

== Roster ==
1969–70 Wisconsin Badgers men's basketball team
| Players | Coaches |
|---|---|
| Pos. / # / Name / Height / Weight / Year / Hometown | Head coach: John Powless; Assistant coach(es) Legend: (C) Team captain; (S) Suspended; (I) Ineligible; (W) Walk-on; Injured; Current redshirt |

== Schedule ==
| Date time, TV | Rank^{#} | Opponent^{#} | Result | Record | Site city, state |
Regular Season
| 12/01/1969* | | Ball State | W 88–74 | 1–0 | UW Fieldhouse; Madison, WI |
| 12/06/1969* | | at Southern Methodist | W 78–76 | 2–0 | Moody Coliseum; University Park, TX |
| 12/08/1969* | | at Kansas | L 60–78 | 2–1 | Allen Fieldhouse; Lawrence, KS |
| 12/13/1969* | | Southern Illinois | L 69–74 | 2–2 | UW Fieldhouse; Madison, WI |
| 12/16/1969* | | at Iowa State | L 73–84 | 2–3 | Iowa State Armory; Ames, IA |
| 12/20/1969* | | Pittsburgh | W 85–71 | 3–3 | UW Fieldhouse; Madison, WI |
| 12/26/1969* | | vs. Utah State; Milwaukee Classic | W 81–74 | 4–3 | Milwaukee Arena; Milwaukee, WI |
| 12/27/1969* | | vs. Marquette; Milwaukee Classic | L 43–64 | 4–4 | Milwaukee Arena; Milwaukee, WI |
| 01/03/1970 | | Illinois | L 69–74 | 4–5 (0–1) | UW Fieldhouse; Madison, WI |
| 1/06/1970 | | at Purdue | L 74–90 | 4–6 (0–2) | Purdue Arena; West Lafayette, IN |
| 1/10/1970 | | Iowa | L 74–92 | 4–7 (0–3) | UW Fieldhouse; Madison, WI |
| 1/13/1970 | | Minnesota | W 90–84 | 5–7 (1–3) | UW Fieldhouse; Madison, WI |
| 1/27/1970* | | at No. 7 Marquette | L 51–60 | 5–8 | Marquette Gymnasium; Milwaukee, WI |
| 1/31/1970* | | No. 13 Ohio | W 72–69 | 6–8 | UW Fieldhouse; Madison, WI |
| 2/03/1970 | | at No. 14 Illinois | W 66–65 | 7–8 (2–3) | Assembly Hall; Champaign, IL |
| 2/07/1970 | | Michigan State | W 89–79 | 8–8 (3–3) | UW Fieldhouse; Madison, WI |
| 2/10/1970 | | at No. 14 Iowa | L 100–119 | 8–9 (3–4) | Iowa Field House; Iowa City, IA |
| 2/14/1970 | | Michigan | W 84–74 | 9–9 (4–4) | UW Fieldhouse; Madison, WI |
| 2/17/1970 | | Indiana | L 77–89 | 9–10 (4–5) | UW Fieldhouse; Madison, WI |
| 2/21/1970 | | at Northwestern | L 75–82 | 9–11 (4–6) | Welsh-Ryan Arena; Evanston, IL |
| 2/24/1970 | | Ohio State | L 86–98 | 9–12 (4–7) | UW Fieldhouse; Madison, WI |
| 2/28/1970 | | at Michigan | W 90–86 | 10–12 (5–7) | Crisler Arena; Ann Arbor, MI |
| 3/03/1970 | | Northwestern | L 82–87 | 10–13 (5–8) | UW Fieldhouse; Madison, WI |
| 3/07/1970 | | at Ohio State | L 87–96 | 10–14 (5–9) | St. John Arena; Columbus, OH |
*Non-conference game. ^{#}Rankings from AP Poll. (#) Tournament seedings in parentheses.
