= Paul Spicer =

American gridiron football player and coach (born 1975)

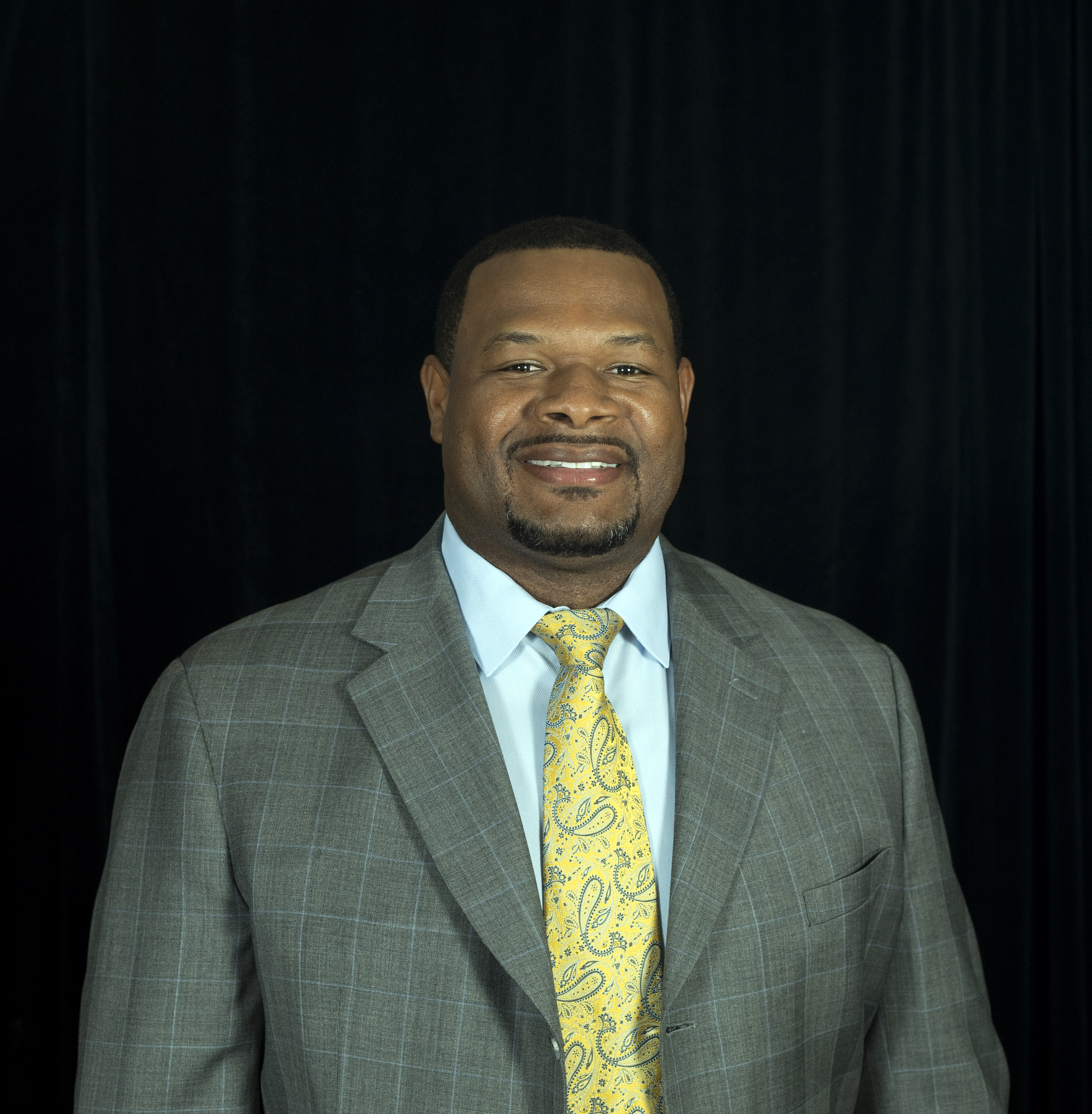
- Spicer in 2019

No. 90, 60, 95, 96
- Position: Defensive end

Personal information
- Born: August 18, 1975 (age 51); Indianapolis, Indiana, U.S.
- Listed height: 6 ft 4 in (1.93 m)
- Listed weight: 295 lb (134 kg)

Career information
- High school: Indianapolis (IN) Northwest
- College: College of DuPage; Saginaw Valley State
- NFL draft: 1998: undrafted

Career history

Playing
- Seattle Seahawks (1998)*; Saskatchewan Roughriders (1998); Detroit Lions (1999); Jacksonville Jaguars (2000–2008); → Frankfurt Galaxy (2001); New Orleans Saints (2009)
- * Offseason or practice squad member only

Coaching
- Jacksonville Jaguars (2011–2012) Assistant defensive line coach; Tampa Bay Buccaneers (2015–2018) Assistant defensive line coach; New Orleans Breakers (2022) Defensive line coach; San Antonio Brahmas (2023) Defensive line coach

Awards and highlights
- Super Bowl champion (XLIV)

Career NFL statistics
- Total tackles: 259
- Sacks: 28.5
- Forced fumbles: 8
- Fumble recoveries: 4
- Interceptions: 1
- Stats at Pro Football Reference

Paul Spicer (born August 18, 1975) is an American football coach and former defensive end who was most recently the defensive line coach for the San Antonio Brahmas of the XFL. He played college football at Saginaw Valley State. He then played 12 seasons in the National Football League (NFL) from 1998 to 2009, the majority of his career with the Jacksonville Jaguars. He was signed by the Seattle Seahawks as an undrafted free agent in 1998.

In his playing days, Spicer also was a member of the Saskatchewan Roughriders, Detroit Lions, and New Orleans Saints.

== Early life ==
Spicer attended Northwest High School in Indianapolis, Indiana.

== College career ==
=== DuPage ===
Spicer attended the College of DuPage in Glen Ellyn, Illinois for two years, where he played for legendary coach Bob McDougal. As a sophomore, he was a JUCO All-American linebacker and helped lead the Chaparrals to 24 straight wins.

=== Saginaw Valley State ===
Paul was a two-year starter at Saginaw Valley State University where he played for former University of Minnesota and Northern Illinois University head coach Jerry Kill. He missed most of his junior year with a broken fibula. He was named MVP of the GLICA conference in 1998 posted 16.5 sacks during his senior season.

== Professional career ==
=== Seattle Seahawks ===
Spicer was signed as an undrafted free agent by the Seattle Seahawks in 1998 but was waived before the start of the season.

=== Saskatchewan Roughriders ===
After his release from the Seahawks, Spicer played part of the 1998 season with the Saskatchewan Roughriders of the Canadian Football League.

=== Detroit Lions ===
Spicer was signed by the Detroit Lions and was on the practice squad for most of the 1999 season.

=== Jacksonville Jaguars ===
Spicer was signed by the Jacksonville Jaguars in 2000 but only played in three games. In 2001, he was allocated by the Jaguars to play with the Frankfurt Galaxy in NFL Europe. His best season with the Jaguars came in 2005 when he accumulated 37 tackles (30 solo), 7.5 sacks, and two pass deflections. Spicer helped lead the Jaguars to their first playoff berth in six years.

On February 28, 2009, Spicer was cut from the Jaguars.

=== New Orleans Saints ===
Spicer agreed to terms on a one-year contract with the New Orleans Saints on March 17, 2009.

Spicer was released on September 5, 2009, and remained a free agent until being re-signed on January 5, 2010, after defensive end Charles Grant was placed on injured reserve.

=== Jacksonville Jaguars ===
On February 23, 2011, the Jacksonville Jaguars signed Paul Spicer to a one-day contract so the defensive end could retire as a member of the team that he started his career with.

== Coaching career ==
=== Jacksonville Jaguars ===
On February 24, 2011, Spicer's one day contract with the Jaguars expired, officially retiring him from the NFL. Spicer was hired as the assistant defensive line coach by the Jacksonville Jaguars.

=== Tampa Bay Buccaneers ===
On February 26, 2015, Spicer was hired as the assistant defensive line coach for the Tampa Bay Buccaneers, reuniting him with defensive line coach Joe Cullen.

=== New Orleans Breakers ===
On March 17, 2022, it was announced that Spicer would be hired as the Defensive Line coach for the New Orleans Breakers of the United States Football League.

=== San Antonio Brahmas ===
Spicer was officially hired by the San Antonio Brahmas of the XFL to be their Defensive Line coach on September 13, 2022 Spicer was not retained after the 2023 XFL season after the departure of Head Coach Hines Ward.

== Personal life ==
Spicer is a former a co-host of In to the End Zone on WJXT. Spicer has a wife named Shariffa and has five children.

He was reunited with some of his paternal relatives through the WE TV show "The Locator" on an episode that aired September 19, 2009.

=== Acting ===
Spicer has a speaking part in The Year of Getting to Know Us, a movie that was filmed in Jacksonville. The film stars Jimmy Fallon and Tom Arnold. The producers of the movie needed a burly security guard who could toss Fallon out of an airplane for a scene at Jacksonville International Airport.
