= 1969–70 Michigan State Spartans men's basketball team =

American college basketball season

1969–70 Michigan State Spartans men's basketball
- Conference: Big Ten Conference
- Record: 9–15 (5–9 Big Ten)
- Head coach: Gus Ganakas (1st season)
- Assistant coaches: Robert Nordmann; Matthew Aitch
- Captains: James Gibbons; Lloyd Ward
- Home arena: Jenison Fieldhouse

1969–70 Big Ten Conference men's basketball standings
	Conf.				Overall
Team	W		L	PCT	W		L	PCT
No. 7 Iowa	14	–	0	1.000	20	–	5	.800
Purdue	11	–	3	.786	18	–	6	.750
Ohio State	8	–	6	.571	15	–	9	.625
Illinois	8	–	6	.571	15	–	9	.625
Minnesota	7	–	7	.500	13	–	11	.542
Michigan	5	–	9	.357	10	–	14	.417
Wisconsin	5	–	9	.357	10	–	14	.417
Michigan State	5	–	9	.357	9	–	15	.375
Northwestern	4	–	10	.286	9	–	15	.375
Indiana	3	–	11	.214	7	–	17	.292
Rankings from AP Poll

The 1969–70 Michigan State Spartans men's basketball team represented Michigan State University in the 1969–70 NCAA University Division men's basketball season as members of the Big Ten Conference. They played their home games at Jenison Fieldhouse in East Lansing, Michigan and were coached by Gus Ganakas in his first year as head coach of the Spartans. The Spartans finished the season 9–15, 5–9 in Big Ten play to finish in a three-way tie for sixth place.

Prior to the season, on September 10, 1969, the Spartans head coach, John E. Benington suffered a heart attack and died after jogging at Jenison Fieldhouse at the age of 47. Ganakas, an assistant under Benington, was promoted to head coach for the season.

== Previous season ==
The Spartans finished the 1968–69 season 11–12, 6–8 in Big Ten play to finish in a three-way tie for fifth place.

== Roster and statistics ==
1969–70 Michigan State Spartans men's basketball team
No	Name	Pos	Year	Height	Pts	Reb
11	Lloyd Ward	G	SR	5–11	7.4	2.1
12	Tim Bograkos	G	JR	6–1	3.1	0.9
13	Gary Przybylo	G	SO	6–1		
15	Ralph Simpson	F	SO	6–4	29.0	10.4
21	Rudy Benjamin	G	JR	6–3	12.6	2.8
24	Ronald Gutkowski	F	SO	6–5	8.8	5.8
25	Robert Gale	F	SR	6–5	2.3	1.6
31	Eddie Humphrey	G	JR	6–2	1.3	0.3
32	Steve Kirkpatrick	G	SR	6–2	0.7	0.7
33	Paul Dean	G	JR	6–1	1.4	0.6
35	Pat Miller	F	SO	6–2	7.8	3.7
41	James Gibbons	C	SR	6–6	10.2	7.2
42	Craig Larsen	C	SO	6–9	0.1	
44	Ron Binge	F	SR	6–5	0.0	
45	William Cohrs	C	SO	6–6	0.7	0.6

== Schedule and results ==
Date time, TV	Rank^{#}	Opponent^{#}	Result	Record	Site city, state
Regular season
Dec 1, 1969*		Eastern Kentucky	W 89–85	1–0	Jenison Fieldhouse; East Lansing, MI
Dec 6, 1969*		Toledo	L 80–82	1–1	Jenison Fieldhouse; East Lansing, MI
Dec 13, 1969*		at Western Michigan	W 86–71	2–1	University Arena; Kalamazoo, MI
Dec 17, 1969*		at Butler	L 60–81	2–2	Hinkle Fieldhouse; Indianapolis, IN
Dec 19, 1969*		vs. Bradley; Utah Classic semifinals	W 89–87	3–2	John M. Huntsman Center; Salt Lake City, UT
Dec 20, 1969*		at Utah; Utah Classic championship	L 85–105	3–3	John M. Huntsman Center; Salt Lake City, UT
Dec 27, 1969*		at Oregon; Far West Classic quarterfinals	L 82–87	3–4	McArthur Court; Portland, OR
Dec 29, 1969*		vs. No. 15 Illinois; Far West Classic consolation game	L 77–86	3–5	McArthur Court; Portland, OR
Dec 30, 1969*		vs. Temple; Far West Classic seventh place game	L 51–90	3–6	McArthur Court; Portland, OR
Jan 3, 1970		at Indiana	W 85–84	4–6 (1–0)	Assembly Hall; Bloomington, IN
Jan 10, 1970		Northwestern	W 98–93	5–6 (2–0)	Jenison Fieldhouse; East Lansing, MI
Jan 17, 1970		at Minnesota	L 78–85	5–7 (2–1)	Williams Arena; Minneapolis, MN
Jan 20, 1970*		No. 20 Notre Dame	W 85–82	6–7	Jenison Fieldhouse; East Lansing, MI
Jan 24, 1970		Michigan; Rivalry	L 88–91	6–8 (2–2)	Jenison Fieldhouse; East Lansing, MI
Jan 31, 1970		Minnesota	L 87–92	6–9 (2–3)	Jenison Fieldhouse; East Lansing, MI
Feb 3, 1970		at Purdue	L 86–105	6–10 (2–4)	Mackey Arena; West Lafayette, IN
Feb 7, 1970		at Wisconsin	L 79–89	6–11 (2–5)	Wisconsin Field House; Madison, WI
Feb 10, 1970		Ohio State	L 66–86	6–12 (2–6)	Jenison Fieldhouse; East Lansing, MI
Feb 14, 1970		at No. 14 Iowa	L 77–103	6–13 (2–7)	Iowa Field House; Iowa City, IA
Feb 21, 1970		Indiana	W 78–66	7–13 (3–7)	Jenison Fieldhouse; East Lansing, MI
Feb 24, 1970		Illinois	L 64–74	7–14 (3–8)	Jenison Fieldhouse; East Lansing, MI
Feb 28, 1970		at Ohio State	W 82–80	8–14 (4–8)	St. John Arena; Columbus, OH
Mar 3, 1970		Purdue	L 98–101	8–15 (4–9)	Jenison Fieldhouse; East Lansing, MI
Mar 7, 1970		at Illinois	W 81–76	9–15 (5–9)	Assembly Hall; Champaign, IL
*Non-conference game. ^{#}Rankings from AP Poll. (#) Tournament seedings in parentheses. Source
