= Christian Park School No. 82 =

- U.S. National Register of Historic Places
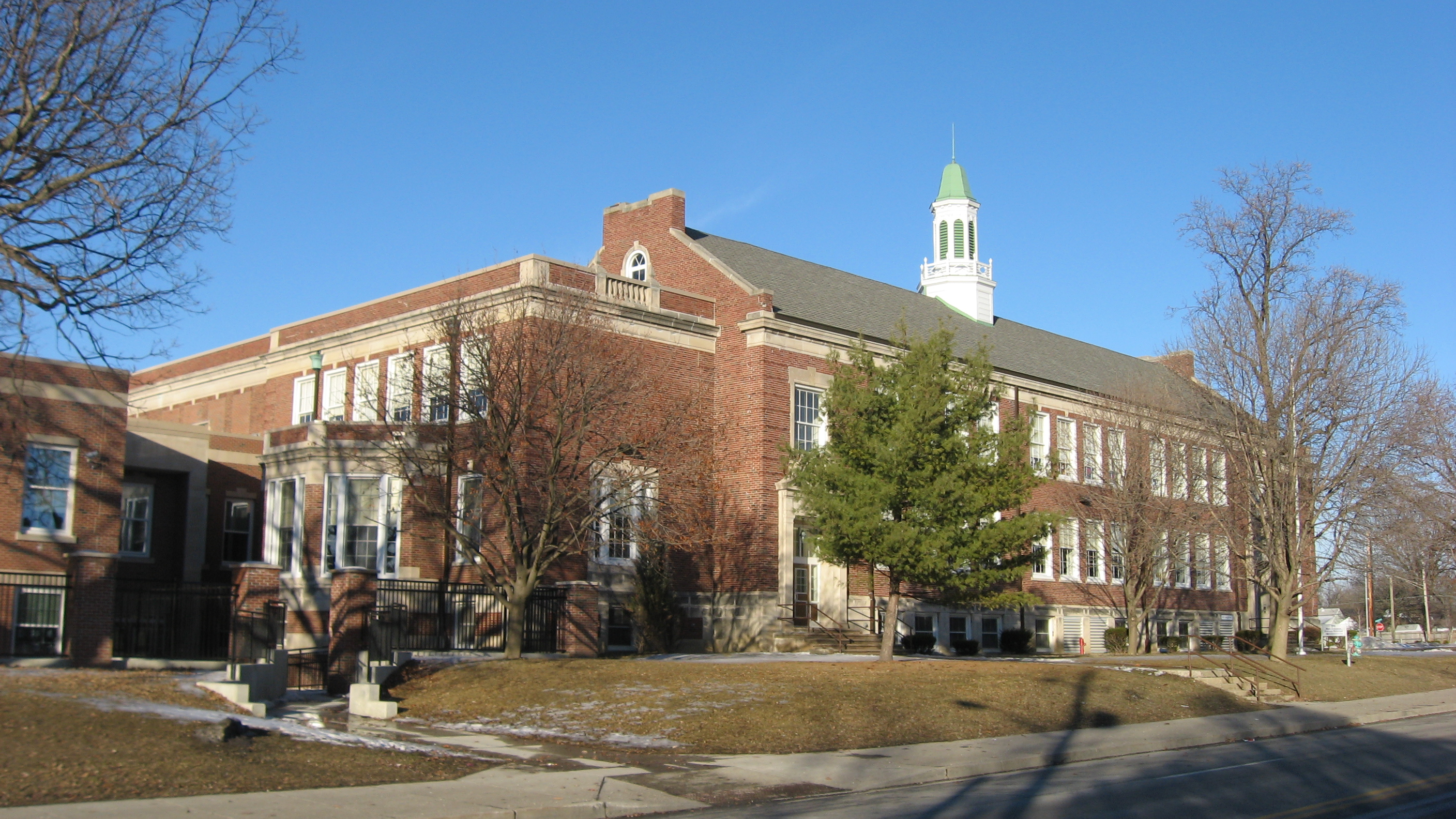
- Christian Park School No. 82, February 2011

- Location within Indianapolis Location within Indiana Location within the United States
- Location: 4700 English Ave., Indianapolis, Indiana
- Coordinates: 39°45′38″N 86°5′20″W
- Area: 3.4 acres (1.4 ha)
- Built: 1931
- Architect: McGuire, William; et al.
- Architectural style: Colonial Revival
- MPS: Public School Buildings in Indianapolis Built Before 1940 MPS
- NRHP reference No.: 95000421
- Added to NRHP: April 28, 1995

Christian Park School No. 82 is a historic school building located at Indianapolis, Indiana. It was built in 1931, and is a two-story, rectangular, Colonial Revival style brick building with a two-story addition built in 1955. It has a gable roof with paired end chimneys, balustrade, and an octagonal cupola.

The building was originally known as "New" School 82 because it replaced "Old" School 82, which was a temporary building nearby on the same street. The student bodies from both "Old" School 82 and School 77 were merged into the new building when it opened. E. F Echolds was the first principal of the new school.

The school was named for Christian Park, which is directly west of the school. After the death of the well-known physician Wilmer Christian in 1923, his wife Edna had donated 75 acres (30 ha) to the city of Indianapolis for a public park.

The building was listed on the National Register of Historic Places in 1995.

== See also ==
- Indianapolis Public Schools
- National Register of Historic Places listings in Center Township, Marion County, Indiana
