= Arlington High School (Indiana) =

Public high school in Indianapolis, Indiana, US

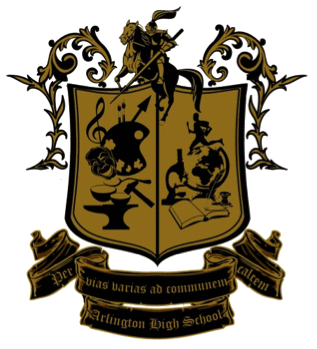

Location
- 4825 North Arlington Avenue; Indianapolis, Marion, Indiana 46226; United States; 39.844211°N 86.063505°W

Information
- Type: Public Secondary
- Established: 1961
- School district: Indianapolis Public Schools
- Principal: Stanley Law
- Faculty: 34
- Grades: 7–12
- Enrollment: 386 (2016–2017)
- Colors: Gold; Black
- Athletics conference: Indianapolis Public School Conference
- Team name: Golden Knights
- Website: myips.org/achs

Arlington High School was a comprehensive public high school located in Indianapolis, Indiana. It closed in 2018 but reopened in 2019 as Arlington Middle School.

== History ==
Arlington High School was established in 1961 to address rapid suburbanization in Indianapolis. Arlington was among the last public high schools to open within the Indianapolis Public Schools system. In 2004, Arlington High School implemented a small school initiative: Traditional departments were done away with and five small schools, or schools within the school were created. Each school has its own academic dean, or principal, and the previous principal became the campus administrator. This district-pushed initiative was meant to improve student success.

Due to decreased district enrollment and continued low performance, Arlington became a 7–12 community school beginning in the 2008–2009 academic year.

In 2015, the school was returned to the control of IPS after being run by Tindley Accelerated Schools for three years. During the early parts of the year the school was faced with many challenges including drugs, vandalism, and violence. After Principal Law requested, and was granted, additional administrative staff from the district, the school began to see a turnaround. By the end of the year academic performance had increased and disciplinary problems had decreased.

In June 2017, Due to the school's low–enrollment and poor academic performance, IPS decided that Arlington would close along with two other schools; Broad Ripple and Northwest High Schools after the 2017–2018 school year. The school board decided Arlington would reopen as a middle school for the 2018–2019 school year.

== Athletics ==
The school's athletic teams are named the Golden Knights.

== Notable alumni ==
- James Brewer (attended) – football player, NFL. Former offensive tackle for the New York Giants, New York Jets.
- Mike Epps (attended) – stand-up comedian, actor, film producer, writer and rapper.
- Vivica A. Fox, 1982 – actress, producer and television host.
- Rick Fuson, 1971 - COO and President of the Indiana Pacers since 1984.
- Bruce Hubbard, 1971 – singer and actor.
- Rodney Scott, (attended) – baseball player, MLB infielder for the New York Yankees, Montreal Expos, Chicago Cubs, Oakland Athletics and Kansas City Royals.
- Deonta Vaughn (attended) – professional basketball player. University of Cincinnati.

== Notable staff ==
- Dave Blase, cyclist and inspiration for the 1979 film Breaking Away. He was a biology teacher at Arlington High School.

== See also ==
- List of schools in Indianapolis
- List of high schools in Indiana
