= Blasé =

Blasé may refer to:

- Blasé (album), a 1969 album by Archie Shepp
- "Blasé" (song), a 2015 song by Ty Dolla Sign
