= Steve Downing =

American basketball player (born 1950)

Personal information
- Born: September 9, 1950 (age 76) Indianapolis, Indiana, U.S.
- Listed height: 6 ft 8 in (2.03 m)
- Listed weight: 225 lb (102 kg)

Career information
- High school: George Washington (Indianapolis, Indiana)
- College: Indiana (1970–1973)
- NBA draft: 1973: 1st round, 17th overall pick
- Drafted by: Boston Celtics
- Playing career: 1973–1974
- Position: Center
- Number: 32

Career history
- 1973–1974: Boston Celtics

Career highlights
- NBA champion (1974)
- Stats at NBA.com
- Stats at Basketball Reference

Steve Downing (born September 9, 1950) is an American former professional basketball player.

A 6'8" center, Downing, along with teammate George McGinnis, led Indianapolis Washington High School to a 31–0 record and a state championship in 1969. He went on to star at Indiana University, and won the Chicago Tribune Silver Basketball award in 1973 as the best player in the Big Ten Conference. Notable performances included the program's first triple-double: 28 points, 17 rebounds and 10 blocks in an 88–79 win over Michigan at the IU Fieldhouse on February 23, 1971; and 47 points and 25 rebounds in a 90–89 double-overtime victory over Kentucky on December 11, 1971.

Downing later played two seasons for the Boston Celtics of the National Basketball Association. He averaged 2.4 points per game in his professional career, and won an NBA Championship ring in 1974.

Currently, Downing is the athletic director at Marian University in Indianapolis.

== Career statistics ==
Legend
GP	Games played	GS	Games started	MPG	Minutes per game
FG%	Field goal percentage	3P%	3-point field goal percentage	FT%	Free throw percentage
RPG	Rebounds per game	APG	Assists per game	SPG	Steals per game
BPG	Blocks per game	PPG	Points per game	**Bold**	Career high
†	Won an NBA championship

=== NBA ===
==== Regular season ====
Year	Team	GP	MPG	FG%	FT%	RPG	APG	SPG	BPG	PPG
1973–74†	Boston	**24**	**5.7**	**.328**	**.579**	**1.6**	**.5**	**.2**	.0	**2.7**
1974–75	Boston	3	3.0	.000	.000	.7	.0	.0	.0	.0
Career		27	5.4	.318	.550	1.5	.4	.2	.0	2.4

==== Playoffs ====
Year	Team	GP	MPG	FG%	FT%	RPG	APG	SPG	BPG	PPG
1974†	Boston	1	4.0	.500	–	2.0	.0	.0	.0	2.0
