= Blase, Missouri =

Unincorporated community in Missouri, U.S.

Coordinates: 38°52′21″N 90°28′38″W

Blase is an unincorporated community in St. Charles County, in the U.S. state of Missouri.

== History ==
A variant name was "Blaze". The community was named after one Mr. Blaze, the original owner of the site.
