= George Washington Community High School =

Public high school in Indianapolis, Indiana, US

George Washington Community High School Indianapolis Washington High School

Location
- 2215 West Washington Street; Indianapolis, Marion County, Indiana 46222; United States; 39°45′54.92″N 86°11′57.12″W

Information
- Type: Public high school
- Established: 1927
- School district: Indianapolis Public Schools
- Principal: Stanley Law
- Teaching staff: 53.50 (FTE)
- Grades: 9-12
- Enrollment: 624 (2023-2024)
- Student to teacher ratio: 11.66
- Color
- Athletics conference: Indianapolis Public School Conference
- Team name: Continentals
- Website: School website

George Washington Community High School is a public school in Indianapolis, Indiana, United States, serving grades 9–12. The school is operated by the Indianapolis Public Schools (IPS) system.

== About ==
The school originally opened in 1927 as a traditional high school in the Haughville neighborhood of Indianapolis. It ceased operations as a high school in 1995 due to waning enrollment within IPS, but was re-established in 2000 in its current form. Enrollment is approximately 575 students. It is referred to as Indianapolis Washington by the Indiana High School Athletic Association (IHSAA).

== Athletics ==
George Washington Community High School's athletic teams are named the Continentals. The Continentals have won two IHSAA State Championships in boys' basketball (1964–65 and 1968–69). The 1969 basketball team became the third team in state history to finish the season undefeated. Fifty years later, the Indianapolis Star still considered them to be one of the best teams to ever play.

== Notable alumni ==
- Steve Downing (Class of 1969) – former member of the Boston Celtics
- Darrin Fitzgerald (Class of 1983) – former Butler basketball player
- Jeff James (1941–2006, Class of 1959) – former professional baseball player, letterman at Indiana State University
- Billy Keller (Class of 1965) – former professional basketball player; played for Purdue and the Indiana Pacers during their time in the American Basketball Association
- Don Leppert (1931–2023, Class of 1950) – American professional baseball player and coach.
- George McGinnis (Class of 1969) – Member of the Naismith Basketball Hall of Fame; former member of the Indiana Pacers, Philadelphia 76ers, and Indiana Hoosiers
- Marv Winkler (Class of 1966) – former member of the Indiana Pacers

== See also ==
- List of schools in Indianapolis
- List of high schools in Indiana
