= Indianapolis Public Schools =

School district in Indianapolis, Indiana, US

Indianapolis Public Schools (IPS)
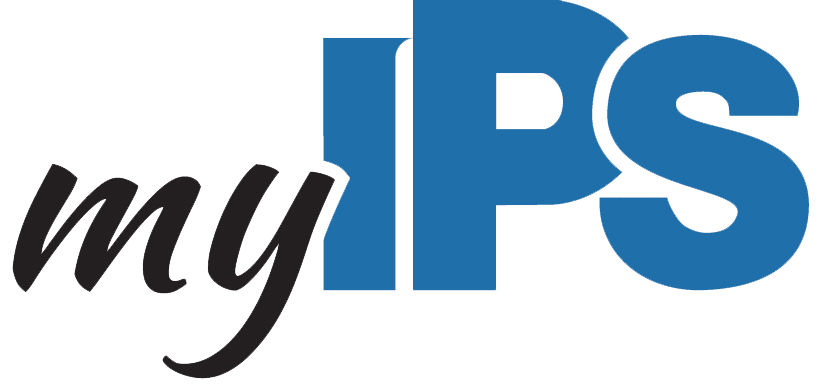

Location
- 120 East Walnut Street; Indianapolis, Indiana United States

District information
- Grades: K–12
- Established: 1853; 173 years ago
- Superintendent: Dr. Aleesia Johnson (elected in June 2019)

Students and staff
- Students: 31,885
- Teachers: 2,579
- Staff: 4,090
- Athletic conference: IPS Conference; Pioneer Conference
- District mascot: Tech Titans; Attucks Tigers; Shortridge Blue Devils; Washington Continentals

Other information
- High School Graduation Rate (Class of 2016): 76.9%
- High School Graduates (Class of 2016): 869
- Website: www.myips.org

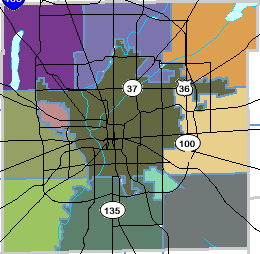
Map of school districts in Marion County; IPS is in

Location of Marion County within Indiana

Indianapolis Public Schools (IPS) is the largest school district in Indianapolis, and the second-largest school district in the state of Indiana as of 2021, behind Fort Wayne Community Schools. The district's headquarters are in the John Morton-Finney Center for Educational Services.

The district's official name is the School City of Indianapolis, and it is governed by a seven-member Board of School Commissioners. It generally serves Indianapolis' closest-in neighborhoods—essentially, Center Township and a few portions of the surrounding townships. Indianapolis Public Schools is the only school corporation in central Indiana to offer choice programs at no cost to students.

The Indianapolis Public Schools district operates a number of public schools that are significant to the history of both Indianapolis and Indiana. In particular, Indianapolis Public Schools operates Shortridge High School, the first public high school in Indiana; Arsenal Technical High School, a multi-building campus located on the grounds of a former U.S. Civil War Arsenal; and Crispus Attucks High School, the first public high school in Indiana to serve black students in compliance with school segregation.

== History ==
=== Public schools in Indiana (1800s) ===
The state of Indiana was admitted to the Union in 1816, with Indianapolis receiving its charter in 1847. That same year, the people of Indiana voted in favor of public schools, in part due to efforts by Indiana citizens; one of these citizens includes Caleb Mills, for whom the current Shortridge High School auditorium is named. As a result of the referendum, a tax levy of 12½ cents per $100 of assessed valuation of property tax was established.

=== Foundation and early beginnings (1850s–1900s) ===
In 1853, Indianapolis incorporated its school system. A few years later, however, the Indiana Supreme Court ruled in an 1858 decision that it was unconstitutional for cities and towns to levy taxes in support of public schools. As a result, all public schools were closed and rented to teachers, although many reopened in 1860.

From 1864 to 1916, three high schools opened under the school district. The first was Indianapolis High School (later renamed Shortridge High School in 1885) in 1864, as the city's first public high school. The school opened in the Marion County Seminary Building, although it was later moved to its present location. The second school was Manual Training High School, later to be known as Emmerich Manual High School, and it was opened in 1895. In 1916, Arsenal Technical Schools, which had opened four years earlier on the grounds of a former U.S. Civil War Arsenal, was incorporated into Indianapolis Public Schools and became Arsenal Technical High School.

=== Expansion (1920s–1960s) ===
The first wave of expansion came during the early part of the 20th century, the city of Indianapolis expanded as it annexed nearby towns such as Broad Ripple. In unison, Indianapolis Public Schools underwent an expansion of its school boundaries, and opened new schools such as Thomas Carr Howe and George Washington high schools. Indianapolis Public Schools also opened an all African-American high school known as Crispus Attucks High School; it was the only African-American high school in Indiana at the time.

The next wave of expansion came during the 1950s and early 1960s, when unprecedented enrollment levels occurred. As a result, three high schools were constructed in a period of seven years: Arlington High School in 1961, Northwest High School in 1963, and John Marshall High School in 1968 (which currently operates as a middle school).

=== Civil Rights era (1960s–1980s) ===
The movement of Caucasian citizens outside central Indianapolis at the time resulted in a decline of enrollment and a change in racial composition in schools such as Broad Ripple High School, which went from having virtually no black students in 1967 to becoming 67% African-American by 1975. At the same time, institutional racial segregation was coming to light in Indianapolis as a result of Civil Rights reformation. U.S. District Judge S. Hugh Dillin issued a ruling in 1971 which found the district guilty of de jure racial segregation.

Beginning in 1973, due to federal court mandates, some 7,000 African-American students began to be bused from the Indianapolis Public Schools district to neighboring township school corporations within Marion County. These townships included Decatur, Franklin, Perry, Warren, Wayne, and Lawrence townships. This practice continued on until 1998, when an agreement was reached between IPS and the United States Department of Justice to phase out inter-district, one-way busing. By 2005, the six township school districts no longer received any new IPS students.

=== Population decline (1970s–1990s) ===
The population of Indianapolis continued to become less concentrated within IPS district boundaries. As a result, between 1971 and 2005, the district lost nearly 70,000 students, and closed some 100 schools.

Harry E. Wood High School closed in 1978. Shortridge High School closed in 1981, and reopened as a middle school in the late 2000s, and now serves as a traditional high school. John Marshall High School closed in 1987 after just eighteen years of service. It later reopened as a middle school in 1993, and in 2008 was converted a high school before returning as a middle school in 2016. Crispus Attucks High School closed in 1986, but reopened as a middle school. George Washington High School and Thomas Carr Howe High School both closed in 1995, which both reopened their doors in 2001.

=== Socioeconomic issues (1990s–2000s) ===
Throughout the 1990s, worsening budgets contributed to problems common to inner city school districts. While the city had a graduation rate higher than the national average in the 1950s, it now had the worst dropout rates in the state. Test scores declined precipitously.

Citizens' task forces studied how to combat school violence, low academic achievement, and persistent racial segregation. In 1992, then-superintendent Shirl Gilbert initiated a "Select Schools" plan, allowing parents the option of selecting which school they wanted their child to attend within the district. While theoretically promising, in practice the plan did not lead to general improvements.

Gilbert was removed from his post by the school board in 1994 and replaced with Esperanza Zendejas in 1995. Zendejas pursued an aggressive program of reform and improvement, removing several administrators from their positions and attempting to implement performance standards upon remaining school administrators. After repeated conflicts with administrators, school board members, and parents, Zendejas resigned from her post in 1997.

The succeeding superintendent was Duncan N.P. "Pat" Pritchett, who had occupied the superintendent's seat in a locum tenens capacity between Gilbert and Zendejas. Under both Gilbert and Zendejas, Pritchett had been an assistant superintendent for facilities management. Under Pritchett, the district saw eight years of steady academic improvement thanks to a number of initiatives, including a partnership with the National Urban Alliance to strengthen literacy and a math/science initiative that set algebra as the eighth-grade gateway math course. Pritchett also brought the concept and planning of the Small Schools Initiative to the district's traditional comprehensive high schools, turning five campuses into 24 schools within a school.

Upon Pritchett's retirement in 2005, the post was offered to and accepted by Eugene G. White, who had been serving as superintendent of the Metropolitan School District of Washington Township in Marion County. White began to implement several reforms, including re-establishing high school programs at two historic schools (Crispus Attucks and Shortridge) as academies devoted to medicine and law/government, respectively. In August 2006, White informed IPS middle school principals that their continued employment depended upon improvement in discipline and test scores.

As of 2006, approximately 36,000 students were in IPS. Many of the facilities in IPS were outdated and in need of renovation, with some facilities being over 70 years old. In 2001, the IPS Board of School Commissioners approved an $832 million plan to upgrade each of the district's 79 schools, in some cases totally replacing outdated buildings with new facilities. The plan has been completed within the last few years.

The Indianapolis Public Schools district lost some schools to outside groups for the improvement of academic and overall performance in the 2000s. A charter management system such Charter Schools USA took over three locations and currently operates Emma Donnan Middle School, Emmerich Manual High School, and Thomas Carr Howe Community High School. In 2012, the state took over Arlington in 2012, after six straight years of "F" grades. Tindley Accelerated Schools, a local nonprofit charter school operator then known as Ed Power, was hired to run Arlington. In 2015, Indianapolis Public Schools retook control of the school after Tindley Accelerated Schools announced in 2014 that it could no longer afford to run the school, and in 2015 Arlington High School was returned to Indianapolis Public Schools control under a State Board ruling.

== Boundary ==
IPS includes all of Center Township and sections of these townships: Decatur, Lawrence, Perry, Pike, Warren, Washington, and Wayne. All of IPS is within the balance of Indianapolis.

== High schools ==
=== Current high schools ===
As of the 2018–19 school year, Indianapolis Public Schools maintains four public high schools. They are as follows:

Official name	Nickname	Choice Programming Offered?
Arsenal Technical High School	Tech	Yes
Crispus Attucks Medical Magnet High School	Attucks	Yes
George Washington Community High School	Washington	Yes
Shortridge IB High School	Shortridge	Yes
Christel House Watanabe Manual High School	Christel	Yes

=== School closures and restructuring ===
Official name	Nickname	Choice Programming Offered?	All-Choice School
Arlington High School	Arlington	No	–
Broad Ripple Magnet High School for the Arts and Humanities	Broad Ripple	Yes	Yes
Northwest High School	Northwest	No	–

In an effort to remake its high school programs and address declining enrollment that has left its high school buildings two-thirds empty, the district in early 2017 announced plans to close Broad Ripple High School, Arlington High School, and Northwest High School. The plan proved controversial by students, teachers, and alumni of these three schools, especially among the Broad Ripple High School community. That same year, a September vote by the Indianapolis Public Schools board that same year finalized in the plans to close these three high schools by the end of the 2017–18 school year. In June 2018, the three high schools all graduated their final classes.

Indianapolis Public Schools plans to move to an all-choice high school model at the remaining four high schools: Arsenal Technical High School, Crispus Attucks High School, George Washington High School, and Shortridge High School. Under this high school model, students can choose their school of attendance based on personal preference, and not geographic location.

== K-8 Schools ==
- Emma Donnan School 72
- Christel House Academy South
- Cold Spring School
- Edison School of the Arts 47
- Enlace Academy
- Wendell Phillips School 63
- Stephen Foster School 67
- Washington Irving Neighborhood School 14

== Elementary schools ==
- Anna Brochhausen School 88
- Arlington Woods School 99
- Benjamin Harrison School 2
- Brookside School 54
- Carl Wilde School 79
- Charity Dye School 27
- Charles Warren Fairbanks School 105
- Christian Park School No. 82
- Clarence Farrington school 61
- Daniel Webster School 46
- Francis Scott Key School 103
- Elder W. Diggs School 42
- Eleanor Skillen School 34
- Eliza Blaker School 55
- Ernie Pyle School 90
- Frederick Douglass School 19
- George W. Julian School 57
- George Washington Carver School
- George H. Fisher School 93
- Riverside School 44
- James A. Garfield School 31
- James Russell Lowell School 51
- James Whitcomb Riley School 43
- Jonathan Jennings School 109
- Joseph J. Bingham School 84
- Lew Wallace School 107
- Louis B. Russel School 48
- Mary Nicholson School 70
- Meredith Nicholson School 96
- Merle Sidener Academy 59
- Ralph Waldo Emerson School 58
- Robert Lee Frost School 106
- ROOTS Program
- Rosseau McClellan School 91
- Theodore Potter School 74
- Thomas Gregg Neighborhood School
- William Bell School 60
- William McKinley School 39

== Middle Schools ==
- Arlington Middle School
- Avondale Meadows Middle School
- Broad Ripple Middle School
- H.L. Harshman Middle School
- H.W. Longfellow Middle School
- Monarca Academy
- Northwest Middle School
- Step Head Academy
- Thomas Carr Howe Middle School
- William Penn School 49

== Alternative Schools ==
- Positive Supports Academy

== See also ==
- List of school districts in Indiana
