= 1970 NCAA Men's Basketball All-Americans =

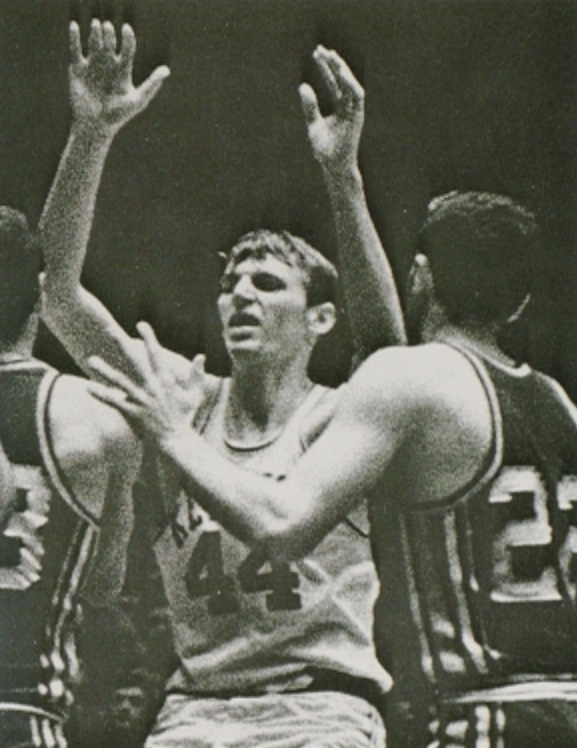
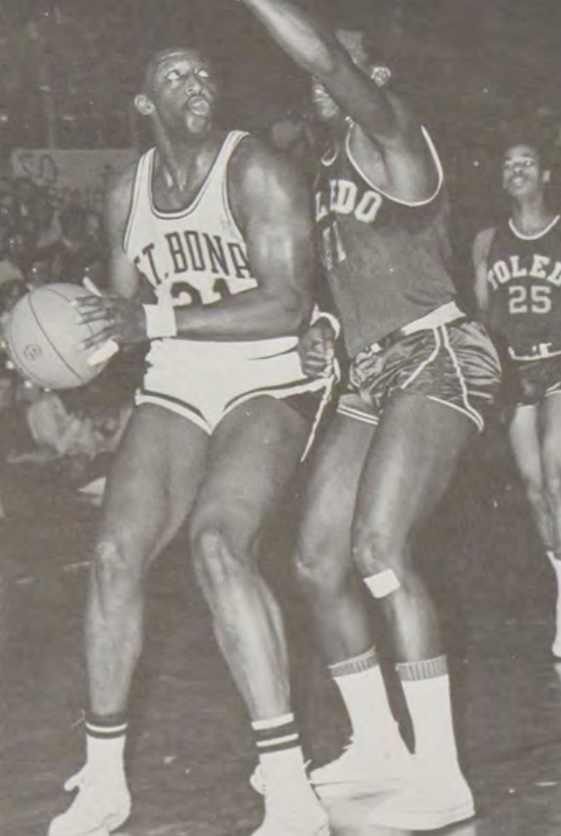
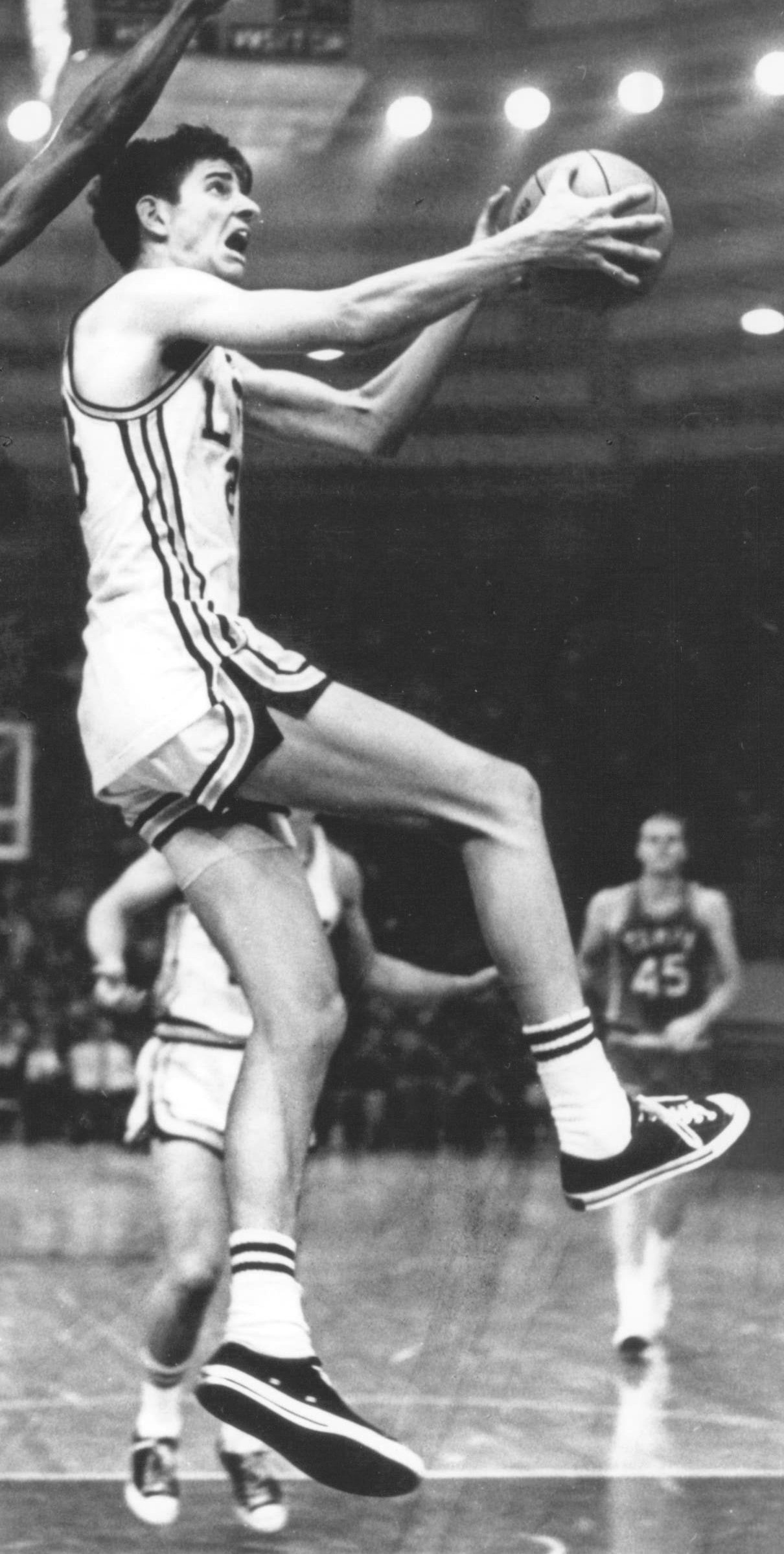
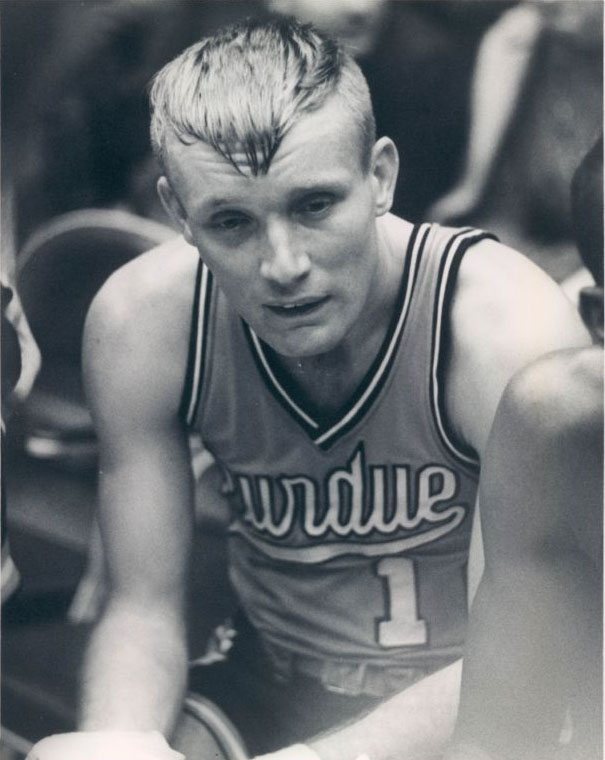
- Members of the 1970 Consensus All-America first team. Clockwise from upper left: Issel, Lanier, Mount and Maravich (not pictured: Murphy).
- Awarded for: 1969–70 NCAA University Division men's basketball season

The consensus 1970 College Basketball All-American team, as determined by aggregating the results of four major All-American teams. To earn "consensus" status, a player must win honors from a majority of the following teams: the Associated Press, the USBWA, The United Press International and the National Association of Basketball Coaches.

== 1970 Consensus All-America team ==
Consensus First Team
Player	Position	Class	Team
Dan Issel	F/C	Senior	Kentucky
Bob Lanier	C	Senior	St. Bonaventure
Pete Maravich	G/F	Senior	Louisiana State
Rick Mount	G/F	Senior	Purdue
Calvin Murphy	G	Senior	Niagara

Consensus Second Team
Player	Position	Class	Team
Austin Carr	G	Junior	Notre Dame
Jim Collins	G	Senior	New Mexico State
John Roche	G	Junior	South Carolina
Charlie Scott	F	Senior	North Carolina
Sidney Wicks	F	Junior	UCLA

== Individual All-America teams ==
All-America Team
All-America Team	First team		Second team		Third team	
All-America Team	Player	School	Player	School	Player	School
Associated Press	Dan Issel	Kentucky	Austin Carr	Notre Dame	John Johnson	Iowa
Associated Press	Bob Lanier	St. Bonaventure	Artis Gilmore	Jacksonville	Mike Maloy	Davidson
Associated Press	Pete Maravich	Louisiana State	John Roche	South Carolina	Jim McMillian	Columbia
Associated Press	Rick Mount	Purdue	Charlie Scott	North Carolina	John Vallely	UCLA
Associated Press	Calvin Murphy	Niagara	Rudy Tomjanovich	Michigan	Sidney Wicks	UCLA
USBWA	Austin Carr	Notre Dame	No second, third or fourth teams (10-man first team)			
USBWA	Jim Collins	New Mexico State	No second, third or fourth teams (10-man first team)			
USBWA	Dan Issel	Kentucky	No second, third or fourth teams (10-man first team)			
USBWA	Bob Lanier	St. Bonaventure	No second, third or fourth teams (10-man first team)			
USBWA	Pete Maravich	Louisiana State	No second, third or fourth teams (10-man first team)			
USBWA	Rick Mount	Purdue	No second, third or fourth teams (10-man first team)			
USBWA	Calvin Murphy	Niagara	No second, third or fourth teams (10-man first team)			
USBWA	John Roche	South Carolina	No second, third or fourth teams (10-man first team)			
USBWA	Charlie Scott	North Carolina	No second, third or fourth teams (10-man first team)			
USBWA	Sidney Wicks	UCLA	No second, third or fourth teams (10-man first team)			
NABC	Dan Issel	Kentucky	Austin Carr	Notre Dame	Mike Maloy	Davidson
NABC	Bob Lanier	St. Bonaventure	Artis Gilmore	Jacksonville	John Roche	South Carolina
NABC	Pete Maravich	Louisiana State	Jim McMillian	Columbia	Ralph Simpson	Michigan State
NABC	Rick Mount	Purdue	Calvin Murphy	Niagara	Rudy Tomjanovich	Michigan
NABC	Charlie Scott	North Carolina	Sidney Wicks	UCLA	John Vallely	UCLA
UPI	Dan Issel	Kentucky	Austin Carr	Notre Dame	John Johnson	Iowa
UPI	Bob Lanier	St. Bonaventure	Artis Gilmore	Jacksonville	Mike Maloy	Davidson
UPI	Pete Maravich	Louisiana State	John Roche	South Carolina	John Vallely	UCLA
UPI	Rick Mount	Purdue	Charlie Scott	North Carolina	Sidney Wicks	UCLA
UPI	Calvin Murphy	Niagara	Rudy Tomjanovich	Michigan	Rich Yunkus	Georgia Tech

AP Honorable Mention:

- Nate Archibald, UTEP
- Jim Ard, Cincinnati
- Dennis Awtrey, Santa Clara
- Henry Bibby, UCLA
- Bill Cain, Iowa State
- Corky Calhoun, Penn
- Jim Collins, New Mexico State
- Dave Cowens, Florida State
- Jarrett Durham, Duquesne
- Mike Grosso, Louisville
- Jeff Halliburton, Drake
- Steve Hawes, Washington
- Sam Lacey, New Mexico State
- Bob Lienhard, Georgia
- Stan Love, Oregon
- Jim McDaniels, Western Kentucky
- Cliff Meely, Colorado
- Dean Meminger, Marquette
- John Mengelt, Auburn
- Mike Newlin, Utah
- Andy Owens, Florida
- Geoff Petrie, Princeton
- Howard Porter, Villanova
- Mike Pratt, Kentucky
- Marv Roberts, Utah State
- Dave Robisch, Kansas
- Curtis Rowe, UCLA
- Ralph Simpson, Michigan State
- Willie Sojourner, Weber State
- Dave Sorenson, Ohio State
- John Sutter, Tulane
- Ollie Taylor, Houston
- Jerry Venable, Kansas State
- Vann Williford, NC State
- Rich Yunkus, Georgia Tech

== Academic All-Americans ==
On May 12, 1970, CoSIDA announced the 1970 Academic All-America team. The following is the 1969–70 Academic All-America Men's Basketball Team as selected by CoSIDA:

Academic All-America Team
Player	School	Class
Dennis Awtrey	Santa Clara	Senior
Ron Becker	New Mexico	Senior
Jim Cooper	Air Force	Senior
Dan Issel	Kentucky	Senior
Mike Newlin	Utah	Junior
Mike Pratt	Kentucky	Senior
John Roche	South Carolina	Junior
Charlie Scott	North Carolina	Senior
Ralph Simpson	Michigan State	Junior
Rich Yunkus	Georgia Tech	Junior
Bill Zopf	Duquesne	Senior

== See also ==
- 1969–70 NCAA University Division men's basketball season
