= Thomas Carr Howe Middle School =

Public middle school in Indianapolis, Indiana, US

Thomas Carr Howe Middle School, an IB World School
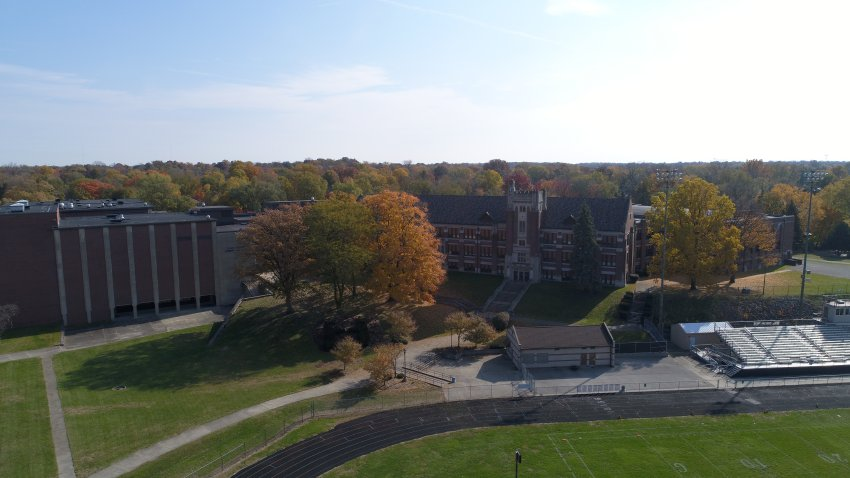
- Howe High School aerial view.

Location
- 4900 Julian Avenue; Indianapolis, Marion County, Indiana 46201; United States; 39.768203°N 86.085486°W

Information
- Type: Public
- Established: 1937
- School district: Indianapolis Public Schools
- Superintendent: Aleesia Johnson
- Principal: Dr. Jason Bletzinger
- Faculty: 44
- Grades: 6-8
- Enrollment: 643
- Color
- Athletics conference: Indianapolis Public School Conference
- Team name: Hornets
- Website: https://myips.org/thomascarrhowe/

Thomas Carr Howe IB World Middle School is an Indianapolis Public Schools middle school in Indianapolis will serve grades 6–8 starting in the fall of 2024. The school previously served as a community high school under several different iterations since its founding in the 1930s.

== History ==
Thomas Carr Howe High School (Indianapolis public school #420) broke ground in 1937. It was originally known as Irvington High School and was meant to serve the Irvington neighborhood and surrounding areas on the eastside of Indianapolis. The first classes were in 1938. After opening, the school was renamed for Thomas Carr Howe, a Butler University president.

The school closed down in 1995. Howe reopened in 2000 as a community high school serving grades 7-12 school under the name Thomas Carr Howe Community High School. Howe was eventually closed again in 2020.

=== 2024 reopening ===
In the fall of 2024, Howe reopened as an International Baccalaureate IB World middle school for grades 6–8 in the 2024–25 school year as part of IPS's Rebuilding Stronger plan.

== See also ==
- Indianapolis Public School Conference
- List of schools in Indianapolis
- List of high schools in Indiana
