= 1969–70 Georgetown Hoyas men's basketball team =

American college basketball season

1969–70 Georgetown Hoyas men's basketball

Kodak Classic Champions National Invitation Tournament, First Round
- Conference: Independent
- Record: 18–7
- Head coach: John Magee (4th season)
- Assistant coach: Jim Lyddy (1st season)
- Captains: Charlie Adrion; Jim Higgins
- Home arena: McDonough Gymnasium

1969–70 NCAA University Division men's basketball independents standings
	Conf.				Overall
Team	W		L	PCT	W		L	PCT
No. 4 Jacksonville		–		–	27	–	2	.931
No. 5 New Mexico State		–		–	27	–	3	.900
No. 8 Marquette		–		–	26	–	3	.897
No. 3 St. Bonaventure		–		–	25	–	3	.893
No. 11 Florida State		–		–	23	–	3	.885
No. 12 Houston		–		–	25	–	5	.833
Army		–		–	22	–	6	.786
No. 17 Niagara		–		–	22	–	7	.759
No. 16 Utah State		–		–	22	–	7	.759
Villanova		–		–	22	–	7	.759
No. 9 Notre Dame		–		–	21	–	8	.724
St. John's		–		–	21	–	8	.724
Georgetown		–		–	18	–	7	.720
Duquesne		–		–	17	–	7	.708
Dayton		–		–	19	–	8	.704
Manhattan		–		–	18	–	8	.692
Hardin–Simmons		–		–	17	–	9	.654
Holy Cross		–		–	16	–	9	.640
Long Island		–		–	16	–	9	.640
Georgia Tech		–		–	17	–	10	.630
Creighton		–		–	15	–	10	.600
Seattle		–		–	15	–	10	.600
Boston University		–		–	14	–	10	.583
Butler		–		–	15	–	11	.577
Oklahoma City		–		–	17	–	13	.567
Fairleigh Dickinson		–		–	13	–	10	.565
Southern Illinois		–		–	13	–	10	.565
Colgate		–		–	14	–	11	.560
Providence		–		–	14	–	11	.560
Denver		–		–	13	–	11	.542
Loyola (IL)		–		–	13	–	11	.542
Penn State		–		–	13	–	11	.542
Rutgers		–		–	13	–	11	.542
Saint Peter's		–		–	13	–	11	.542
Northern Illinois		–		–	13	–	12	.520
Air Force		–		–	12	–	12	.500
Fairfield		–		–	12	–	12	.500
Iona		–		–	12	–	12	.500
NYU		–		–	12	–	12	.500
Pittsburgh		–		–	12	–	12	.500
Saint Francis (PA)		–		–	12	–	12	.500
Syracuse		–		–	12	–	12	.500
DePaul		–		–	12	–	13	.480
West Texas State		–		–	12	–	13	.480
Loyola (LA)		–		–	12	–	14	.462
Boston College		–		–	11	–	13	.458
Virginia Tech		–		–	10	–	12	.455
St. Francis (NY)		–		–	9	–	12	.429
West Virginia		–		–	11	–	15	.423
Canisius		–		–	9	–	13	.409
Fordham		–		–	10	–	15	.400
Seton Hall		–		–	10	–	15	.400
Marshall		–		–	9	–	14	.391
Miami (FL)		–		–	9	–	17	.346
Centenary		–		–	8	–	16	.333
Pan American		–		–	8	–	16	.333
Detroit		–		–	7	–	18	.280
Tulane		–		–	5	–	18	.217
Xavier		–		–	5	–	20	.200
Navy		–		–	4	–	19	.174
Portland		–		–	4	–	22	.154
Rankings from AP Poll

The 1969–70 Georgetown Hoyas men's basketball team represented Georgetown University during the 1969–70 NCAA University Division college basketball season. John Magee coached them in his fourth season as head coach. The team was an independent and played its home games at McDonough Gymnasium on the Georgetown campus in Washington, D.C. It finished the season with a record of 18–7, Magee's best record during his six seasons as head coach, and was the last Georgetown team to appear in a post-season tournament until the 1974–75 team played in the 1975 NCAA tournament.

== Season recap ==
Since the 1942–43 team's appearance in the 1943 NCAA Division I men's basketball tournament, Georgetown had only been to the post-season once, when the 1952–53 team went to the 1953 National Invitation Tournament (NIT), after that never contending for the NCAA tournament and always falling short of consideration for the NIT. Georgetown's recent teams had been especially disappointing, losing seven of their final 10 games in the 1964–65 season, eight of their final 11 in the 1966–67 season, and seven of their last nine games in 1968–69, each time squandering a strong start that otherwise might have gotten them into the post-season. However, Coach Magee had higher hopes in 1969–70, with senior center Charlie Adrion, senior guard Mike Laska. and junior guard Don Weber returning and sophomore forwards Andy Gill, Mike Laughna, and Art White joining the varsity squad after a very strong 1968–69 season on the freshman team. Magee was especially excited about White, whom he declared in 1970 to be the "best prospect I have coached, and with the potential to be...the best in Georgetown history before he graduates." A general feeling existed among Georgetown fans that the team had a legitimate shot at a post-season berth, especially in the NIT.

With White consistently scoring in double figures and Laughna beginning the season and his varsity career with a 14-rebound performance against American, the Hoyas went 12-2 in the season's first 14 games. In an unusual event during this stretch that would prove significant later, they were losing 41–26 on December 18, 1969, in the first half at an 18th-ranked Jacksonville team led by Artis Gilmore when hostile Jacksonville fans flooded onto the court, prompting Magee to pull his team from the game. The game's officials ruled it a Georgetown forfeit and gave the Hoyas a loss. Georgetown appealed the decision to the National Collegiate Athletic Association (NCAA), and in February 1970 the NCAA overruled the officials' decision and declared the game a "no contest," meaning that neither Georgetown or Jacksonville would be credited with a win or loss for the game.

In late December 1969, Laughna scored a combined 50 points and 31 rebounds against Penn State and Stanford in the Kodak Classic and was declared the Classic's Most Valuable Player. In his next game after the Classic, he opened the new year of 1970 with a 19-rebound performance against Holy Cross.

On January 14, 1970, Georgetown defeated longtime rival St. Joseph's 89–80, the Hoyas' first victory over the Hawks since 1967 and only their second since 1956. In a balanced attack, five Hoyas finished in double figures, and the win was crucial to Georgetown's hopes for a postseason tournament bid.

In February, Charlie Adrion had 20 points and 15 rebounds against New York University and five days later scored 20 points at Boston College. Georgetown posted a home record of 12–1, the best in the history of McDonough Gymnasium at the time, and Laughna scored in double figures in 21 of the 25 games he played in, including the final 18 games of the year. Don Weber scored in double figures 15 times, averaging 11.2 points and 3.3 assists per game, and had a career-high 25 points against George Washington.

Despite this, the Hoyas suffered a number of road losses late in the year that again put the team's hopes of a postseason bid in jeopardy, especially a loss to Manhattan at Madison Square Garden in New York City late in the season in which Adrion scored a season-low six points. But Saint Peter's upset Manhattan in the last game of the season while the Hoyas beat Penn State in their last regular-season game, with Laughna scoring 21 points and grabbing 13 rebounds and Adrion scoring 13 points. This left Georgetown with an 18-6 regular-season record and prompted the NIT selection committee to invite the Hoyas to the 1970 NIT, the school's first post-season tournament appearance in 17 years. The December 1969 "no contest" game at Jacksonville played an unforeseen role; if Georgetown had completed and lost that game or if the NCAA had stood by the game officials' decision that Georgetown had forfeited, the Hoyas would have finished the regular season at 18–7, and that difference probably would have cost Georgetown its NIT invitation.

The Hoyas faced Louisiana State, led by Pete Maravich, at Madison Square Garden in the first round of the NIT, with CBS televising the game – at a time when there was no regular national television coverage of college basketball – to showcase Maravich. Although Maravich was averaging 45.2 points per game and had scored over 50 points in a game 28 times, Georgetown guard Mike Laska held him to 20 points in a man-to-man defense and Art White scored 28 points, helping Georgetown to come back from seven points down with 3:08 left in the game to close to 81–80 with 17 seconds left. But the Hoyas had to foul Maravich immediately to stop the clock, and he sank both his free throws to give Louisiana State an 83–80 lead. Georgetown closed to 83–82, but ran out of time and was knocked out of the tournament.

White was the Hoyas' leading scorer for the year with 15.1 points per game. Laughna finished the season with a team-leading 261 rebounds, averaging 10.4 rebounds per game.

Pleased with the season despite Georgetown's early exit from the NIT, Magee believed that it heralded a new era of success for Georgetown basketball, but it was not to be. The next season, the Hoyas would go a mediocre 12–14, and in Magee's final season, 1971–72, they would fall to a dismal 3–23 record. It would take the arrival of John Thompson, Jr., as head coach in 1972–73 for Georgetown to begin its rise to the status of a national basketball power.

The team was not ranked in the Top 20 in the Associated Press Poll or Coaches' Poll at any time.

== Roster ==
#	Name	Height	Weight (lbs.)	Position	Class	Hometown	Previous Team(s)
10	Jerry Pyles	N/A	N/A	G/C	Sr.	Oxon Hill, MD, U.S.	Oxon Hill HS
12	Don Weber	5'8"	160	G	Jr.	Ridgewood, NJ, U.S.	Don Bosco Preparatory HS
14	Dick Zeitler	5'11"	N/A	G	Jr.	Seaford, NY, U.S.	Archbishop Molloy HS
20	Jim Higgins	6'1"	N/A	G	Sr.	Dumont, NJ, U.S.	Don Bosco Preparatory HS
22	Tim Mercier	5'10"	N/A	G	Jr.	Jersey City, NJ, U.S.	St. Peter's Preparatory School
24	Paul Favorite	6'8"	N/A	F	Sr.	Moorestown, NJ, U.S.	Saint Joseph's Preparatory School
30	Pete George	6'1"	N/A	G	Sr.	Arlington, VA, U.S.	Army
32	Bob Hannan	6'3"	N/A	F	Jr.	Paterson, NJ, U.S.	St. Mary HS
34	Mike Laska	5'11"	N/A	G	Sr.	Worcester, MA, U.S.	Assumption Preparatory School
40	Ed MacNamara	N/A	N/A	F	Jr.	Dumont, NJ, U.S.	Bergen Catholic HS
42	Mike Laughna	6'7"	210	F	So.	North Caldwell, NJ, U.S.	Saint Benedict's Preparatory School
44	Art White	6'7"	190	F	So.	White Plains, NY, U.S.	Archbishop Stepinac HS
50	Andy Gill	6'3"	N/A	F/C	So.	Allenhurst, NJ, U.S.	Christian Brothers Academy
52	Mark Mitchell	6'8"	N/A	C/F	So.	Chicago, IL, U.S.	Loyola Academy
54	Charlie Adrion	6'8"	225	C	Sr.	Hillsdale, NJ, U.S.	Don Bosco Preparatory HS

== 1969–70 schedule and results ==
Date time, TV	Rank^{#}	Opponent^{#}	Result	Record	Site city, state
Regular Season
Tue., Dec. 2, 1969 no, no		American	W 80–78	1-0	McDonough Gymnasium; Washington, DC
Sat., Dec. 6, 1969 no, no		at Randolph–Macon	W 76–71	2-0	Crenshaw Gymnasium; Ashland, VA
Tue., Dec. 9, 1969 no, no		William & Mary	W 87–82	3-0	McDonough Gymnasium; Washington, DC
Tue., Dec. 11, 1969 no, no		Loyola Maryland	W 107–73	4-0	McDonough Gymnasium; Washington, DC
Sat., Dec. 13, 1969 no, no		at Navy	W 90–81	5-0	Halsey Field House; Annapolis, MD
Mon., Dec. 15, 1969 no, no		St. John's	L 64–71	5-1	McDonough Gymnasium; Washington, DC
Thu., Dec. 18, 1969 no, no		at No. 18 Jacksonville	L 26–41	Game ruled no contest	Jacksonville Coliseum; Jacksonville, FL
Sat., Dec. 20, 1969 no, no		at Florida State	L 65–98	5-2	Bobby Tully Gymnasium; Tallahassee, FL
Mon., Dec. 29, 1969 no, no		vs. Penn State; Kodak Classic	W 86–71	6-2	Rochester Community War Memorial; Rochester, NY
Tue., Dec. 30, 1969 no, no		vs. Stanford; Kodak Classic	W 101–71	7-2	Rochester Community War Memorial; Rochester, NY
Fri., Jan. 2, 1970 no, no		Holy Cross	W 76–75	8-2	McDonough Gymnasium; Washington, DC
Thu., Jan. 8, 1970 no, no		George Washington	W 100–81	9-2	McDonough Gymnasium; Washington, DC
Sat., Jan. 10, 1970 no, no		at Seton Hall	W 88–80	10-2	Walsh Gymnasium; South Orange, NJ
Wed., Jan. 14, 1970 no, no		at St. Joseph's	W 89–80	11-2	Palestra; Philadelphia, PA
Sat., Jan. 17, 1970 no, no		No. 13 Columbia	W 72–68	12-2	McDonough Gymnasium; Washington, DC
Sat., Jan. 31, 1970 no, no		at Fordham	L 63–67	12-3	Rose Hill Gymnasium; Bronx, NY
Wed., Feb. 4, 1970 no, no		Fairleigh Dickinson	W 74–63	13-3	McDonough Gymnasium; Washington, DC
Sat., Feb. 7, 1970 no, no		at Maryland	L 71–81	13-4	Cole Field House; College Park, MD
Thu., Feb. 12, 1970 no, no		New York University	W 94–72	14-4	McDonough Gymnasium; Washington, DC
Sat., Feb. 14, 1970 no, no		Rutgers	W 69–68	15-4	McDonough Gymnasium; Washington, DC
Tue., Feb. 17, 1970 no, no		at Boston College	L 69–79	15-5	Roberts Center; Chestnut Hill, MA
Sat., Feb. 21, 1970 no, no		Catholic	W 90–58	16-5	McDonough Gymnasium; Washington, DC
Tue., Feb. 24, 1970 no, no		Fairfield	W 95–70	17-5	McDonough Gymnasium; Washington, DC
Thu., Feb. 26, 1970 no, no		at Manhattan	L 49–66	17-6	Madison Square Garden; New York, NY
Sat., Feb. 28, 1970 no, no		Penn State	W 76–66	18-6	McDonough Gymnasium; Washington, DC
National Invitation Tournament
Sun., Mar. 15, 1970 no, no		vs. Louisiana State; First Round	L 82–83	18-7	Madison Square Garden; New York, NY
*Non-conference game. ^{#}Rankings from AP Poll. (#) Tournament seedings in parentheses.
