= 1969–70 Jacksonville Dolphins men's basketball team =

American college basketball season

1969–70 Jacksonville Dolphins men's basketball

NCAA tournament, Runner-up Mideast Regional Champions

National Championship Game, L 69–80 vs. UCLA
- Conference: Independent

Ranking
- Coaches: No. 5
- AP: No. 4
- Record: 27–2
- Head coach: Joe Williams (6th season)
- Assistant coaches: Tom Wasdin (4th season); Bill Coulthart (1st season)
- Home arena: Jacksonville Coliseum

1969–70 NCAA University Division men's basketball independents standings
	Conf.				Overall
Team	W		L	PCT	W		L	PCT
No. 4 Jacksonville		–		–	27	–	2	.931
No. 5 New Mexico State		–		–	27	–	3	.900
No. 8 Marquette		–		–	26	–	3	.897
No. 3 St. Bonaventure		–		–	25	–	3	.893
No. 11 Florida State		–		–	23	–	3	.885
No. 12 Houston		–		–	25	–	5	.833
Army		–		–	22	–	6	.786
No. 17 Niagara		–		–	22	–	7	.759
No. 16 Utah State		–		–	22	–	7	.759
Villanova		–		–	22	–	7	.759
No. 9 Notre Dame		–		–	21	–	8	.724
St. John's		–		–	21	–	8	.724
Georgetown		–		–	18	–	7	.720
Duquesne		–		–	17	–	7	.708
Dayton		–		–	19	–	8	.704
Manhattan		–		–	18	–	8	.692
Hardin–Simmons		–		–	17	–	9	.654
Holy Cross		–		–	16	–	9	.640
Long Island		–		–	16	–	9	.640
Georgia Tech		–		–	17	–	10	.630
Creighton		–		–	15	–	10	.600
Seattle		–		–	15	–	10	.600
Boston University		–		–	14	–	10	.583
Butler		–		–	15	–	11	.577
Oklahoma City		–		–	17	–	13	.567
Fairleigh Dickinson		–		–	13	–	10	.565
Southern Illinois		–		–	13	–	10	.565
Colgate		–		–	14	–	11	.560
Providence		–		–	14	–	11	.560
Denver		–		–	13	–	11	.542
Loyola (IL)		–		–	13	–	11	.542
Penn State		–		–	13	–	11	.542
Rutgers		–		–	13	–	11	.542
Saint Peter's		–		–	13	–	11	.542
Northern Illinois		–		–	13	–	12	.520
Air Force		–		–	12	–	12	.500
Fairfield		–		–	12	–	12	.500
Iona		–		–	12	–	12	.500
NYU		–		–	12	–	12	.500
Pittsburgh		–		–	12	–	12	.500
Saint Francis (PA)		–		–	12	–	12	.500
Syracuse		–		–	12	–	12	.500
DePaul		–		–	12	–	13	.480
West Texas State		–		–	12	–	13	.480
Loyola (LA)		–		–	12	–	14	.462
Boston College		–		–	11	–	13	.458
Virginia Tech		–		–	10	–	12	.455
St. Francis (NY)		–		–	9	–	12	.429
West Virginia		–		–	11	–	15	.423
Canisius		–		–	9	–	13	.409
Fordham		–		–	10	–	15	.400
Seton Hall		–		–	10	–	15	.400
Marshall		–		–	9	–	14	.391
Miami (FL)		–		–	9	–	17	.346
Centenary		–		–	8	–	16	.333
Pan American		–		–	8	–	16	.333
Detroit		–		–	7	–	18	.280
Tulane		–		–	5	–	18	.217
Xavier		–		–	5	–	20	.200
Navy		–		–	4	–	19	.174
Portland		–		–	4	–	22	.154
Rankings from AP Poll

The 1969–70 Jacksonville Dolphins men's basketball team represented Jacksonville University during the 1969–70 NCAA University Division basketball season. The independent Dolphins were led by sixth-year head coach Joe Williams and played their home games at the Jacksonville Coliseum.

The sixth-ranked Dolphins finished the regular season at 23–1 (.958) and were invited to the NCAA tournament. In the Mideast regional, they defeated Western Kentucky, No. 7 Iowa, and No. 1 Kentucky to advance to the Final Four; through 2021, it remains the program's only trip. The Dolphins defeated No. 3 St. Bonaventure to advance to the national championship game against second-ranked UCLA; the Bruins won their fourth straight NCAA title, and Jacksonville ended the season at 27–2 (.931) overall.

== Previous season ==
Jacksonville finished the 1968–69 season at 17–7 (.708).

== Season summary ==
The Dolphins were led by 7 ft 2 in (2.18 m) center Artis Gilmore. A two-time All-America honoree (in 1969–70 and 1970–71), Gilmore led the nation in rebounding both seasons. He finished his career with 1,312 points (24.3 average) and 1,224 rebounds (22.7).

The game against Georgetown on December 18 was stopped with 1:23 remaining in the first half following successive brawls between players from both teams and fans. Georgetown head coach Jack Magee pulled his team from the court and Jacksonville was awarded the win.

The Dolphins lost the national championship game to UCLA despite taking an early lead. UCLA narrowed the lead and took over with 1:20 left in the first half. The Bruins never trailed again as they pulled away for the 80–69 win.

== Roster ==
1969–70 Jacksonville Dolphins men's basketball team
Players
Coaches

Pos.	#	Name	Height	Weight	Year	Hometown
G		Rusty Baldwin	5 ft 10 in (1.78 m)	—	So
F		Mike Blevins	6 ft 5 in (1.96 m)	—
PF	42	Pembrook Burrows	7 ft 0 in (2.13 m)	—	Jr
		Chip Dublin	—	—	Jr
C	53	Artis Gilmore	7 ft 2 in (2.18 m)	240 lb (109 kg)	Jr	Chipley, Florida
G		Dan Hawkins	6 ft 5 in (1.96 m)	—	Sr
F		Curtis Kruer	6 ft 5 in (1.96 m)	—	So
G		Rod McIntyre	6 ft 10 in (2.08 m)	—	Sr
G	24	Rex Morgan	6 ft 5 in (1.96 m)	185 lb (84 kg)	Sr	Charleston, Illinois
F		Gregg Nelson	6 ft 6 in (1.98 m)	—	Jr
		Ken Selke	—	—	Sr
G		Vaughn Wedeking	5 ft 10 in (1.78 m)	—	Jr	Evansville, Indiana

Head coach

- Joe Williams

Assistant coach(es)

Legend

- (C) Team captain
- (S) Suspended
- (I) Ineligible
- (W) Walk-on
- Injured
- Current redshirt

== Schedule and results ==
Date time, TV	Rank^{#}	Opponent^{#}	Result	Record	High points	High rebounds	High assists	Site (attendance) city, state
Regular season
December 1, 1969*		East Tennessee State; Sunshine Classic semifinal	W 92–74	1–0	–	–	–	Jacksonville Memorial Coliseum; Jacksonville, FL
December 2, 1969*		Morehead State; Sunshine Classic championship	W 117–63	2–0	–	–	–	Jacksonville Memorial Coliseum; Jacksonville, FL
December 9, 1969*		Mercer	W 102–62	3–0	–	32 – Gilmore	–	Jacksonville Memorial Coliseum; Jacksonville, FL
December 13, 1969*		St. Thomas (FL); Sunshine Classic championship	W 130–65	4–0	–	30 – Gilmore	–	Jacksonville Memorial Coliseum; Jacksonville, FL
December 18, 1969*	No. 18	Georgetown	W 41–26	5–0	–	–	–	Jacksonville Memorial Coliseum; Jacksonville, FL
December 22, 1969*	No. 18	Harvard	W 103–64	6–0	–	–	–	Jacksonville Memorial Coliseum; Jacksonville, FL
December 26, 1969*	No. 13	vs. Arizona; Evansville Invite semifinal	W 104–72	7–0	–	–	–	Roberts Municipal Stadium; Evansville, IN
December 27, 1969*	No. 13	vs. Evansville; Evansville Invite championship	W 100–70	8–0	–	–	–	Roberts Municipal Stadium; Evansville, IN
January 2, 1970*	No. 10	at Hawaii	W 100–78	9–0	–	–	–	Neal S. Blaisdell Center; Honolulu, HI
January 5, 1970*	No. 10	at Hawaii	W 63–58	10–0	–	–	–	Neal S. Blaisdell Center; Honolulu, HI
January 9, 1970*	No. 7	Richmond	W 113–77	11–0	–	–	–	Jacksonville Memorial Coliseum; Jacksonville, FL
January 10, 1970*	No. 7	Miami	W 121–87	12–0	–	–	–	Jacksonville Memorial Coliseum; Jacksonville, FL
January 16, 1970*	No. 6	Virgin Islands	W 114–66	13–0	–	–	–	Jacksonville Memorial Coliseum; Jacksonville, FL
January 27, 1970*	No. 6	at No. 18 Florida State	L 83–89	13–1	–	–	–	Tully Gymnasium; Tallahassee, FL
January 30, 1970*	No. 6	Saint Peter's	W 121–101	14–1	46 – Gilmore	30 – Gilmore	–	Jacksonville Memorial Coliseum; Jacksonville, FL
February 2, 1970*	No. 8	Iona	W 110–75	15–1	–	–	–	Jacksonville Memorial Coliseum; Jacksonville, FL
February 5, 1970*	No. 8	at East Carolina	W 111–94	16–1	–	–	–	Williams Arena at Minges Coliseum; Greenville, NC
February 6, 1970*	No. 8	at Richmond	W 88–49	17–1	–	–	–	Richmond Arena; Richmond, VA
February 13, 1970*	No. 7	at Oklahoma City	W 103–83	18–1	–	–	–	Frederickson Fieldhouse; Oklahoma City, OK
February 14, 1970*	No. 7	at Loyola (LA)	W 96–75	19–1	–	–	–	The Field House; New Orleans, LA
February 18, 1970*	No. 6	No. 18 Florida State	W 85–81	20–1	–	–	–	Jacksonville Memorial Coliseum; Jacksonville, FL
February 24, 1970*	No. 6	Oklahoma City	W 77–75	21–1	–	–	–	Jacksonville Memorial Coliseum; Jacksonville, FL
February 26, 1970*	No. 6	at Georgia Tech	W 86–81	22–1	–	–	–	Alexander Memorial Coliseum; Atlanta, GA
March 2, 1970*	No. 6	at Miami	W 108–97	23–1	–	–	–	Miami Beach Convention Center; Miami, FL
NCAA Tournament
March 7, 1970*	No. 6	vs. No. 12 Western Kentucky; Regional Quarterfinal	W 109–96	24–1	30 – Gilmore	19 – Gilmore	–	University of Dayton Arena; Dayton, OH
March 12, 1970*	No. 4	vs. No. 7 Iowa; Regional semifinal	W 104–103	25–1	30 – Gilmore	17 – Gilmore	–	St. John Arena; Columbus, OH
March 14, 1970*	No. 4	vs. No. 1 Kentucky; Regional final	W 106–100	26–1	28 – Morgan	20 – Gilmore	–	St. John Arena; Columbus, OH
March 19, 1970*; 7:40 pm	No. 4	vs. No. 3 St. Bonaventure; National semifinal	W 91–83	27–1	29 – Gilmore	21 – Gilmore	–	Cole Fieldhouse (14,380); College Park, MD
March 21, 1970*; 4:00 pm	No. 4	vs. No. 2 UCLA; National Championship Game	L 69–80	27–2	19 – Gilmore	16 – Gilmore	–	Cole Fieldhouse (14,380); College Park, MD
*Non-conference game. ^{#}Rankings from AP Poll. (#) Tournament seedings in parentheses. ME=Mideast. All times are in Eastern time.

== Rankings ==
Ranking movements Legend: ██ Increase in ranking ██ Decrease in ranking — = Not ranked т = Tied with team above or below
	Week														
Poll	Pre	1	2	3	4	5	6	7	8	9	10	11	12	13	Final
AP	—	18	18	13	10	7	6	6	6	8	7	6	6	6	4
Coaches	—	20-т	19	19	10	7	7	6	6	8	7	6	6	6	5

== Awards and honors ==
- Artis Gilmore – Second-Team All-American, AP, NABC and UPI

== Team players in the 1970 NBA draft ==
Round	Pick	Player	NBA Club
2	21	Rex Morgan	Boston Celtics
