= 1969–70 St. Bonaventure Brown Indians men's basketball team =

American college basketball season

1969–70 St. Bonaventure Brown Indians men's basketball

East Regional Champions

NCAA tournament, Final Four
- Conference: Independent

Ranking
- Coaches: No. 3
- AP: No. 3
- Record: 25–3
- Head coach: Larry Weise (9th season)
- Assistant coaches: Bob Sassone; Fred Handler
- Home arena: Reilly Center

1969–70 NCAA University Division men's basketball independents standings
	Conf.				Overall
Team	W		L	PCT	W		L	PCT
No. 4 Jacksonville		–		–	27	–	2	.931
No. 5 New Mexico State		–		–	27	–	3	.900
No. 8 Marquette		–		–	26	–	3	.897
No. 3 St. Bonaventure		–		–	25	–	3	.893
No. 11 Florida State		–		–	23	–	3	.885
No. 12 Houston		–		–	25	–	5	.833
Army		–		–	22	–	6	.786
No. 17 Niagara		–		–	22	–	7	.759
No. 16 Utah State		–		–	22	–	7	.759
Villanova		–		–	22	–	7	.759
No. 9 Notre Dame		–		–	21	–	8	.724
St. John's		–		–	21	–	8	.724
Georgetown		–		–	18	–	7	.720
Duquesne		–		–	17	–	7	.708
Dayton		–		–	19	–	8	.704
Manhattan		–		–	18	–	8	.692
Hardin–Simmons		–		–	17	–	9	.654
Holy Cross		–		–	16	–	9	.640
Long Island		–		–	16	–	9	.640
Georgia Tech		–		–	17	–	10	.630
Creighton		–		–	15	–	10	.600
Seattle		–		–	15	–	10	.600
Boston University		–		–	14	–	10	.583
Butler		–		–	15	–	11	.577
Oklahoma City		–		–	17	–	13	.567
Fairleigh Dickinson		–		–	13	–	10	.565
Southern Illinois		–		–	13	–	10	.565
Colgate		–		–	14	–	11	.560
Providence		–		–	14	–	11	.560
Denver		–		–	13	–	11	.542
Loyola (IL)		–		–	13	–	11	.542
Penn State		–		–	13	–	11	.542
Rutgers		–		–	13	–	11	.542
Saint Peter's		–		–	13	–	11	.542
Northern Illinois		–		–	13	–	12	.520
Air Force		–		–	12	–	12	.500
Fairfield		–		–	12	–	12	.500
Iona		–		–	12	–	12	.500
NYU		–		–	12	–	12	.500
Pittsburgh		–		–	12	–	12	.500
Saint Francis (PA)		–		–	12	–	12	.500
Syracuse		–		–	12	–	12	.500
DePaul		–		–	12	–	13	.480
West Texas State		–		–	12	–	13	.480
Loyola (LA)		–		–	12	–	14	.462
Boston College		–		–	11	–	13	.458
Virginia Tech		–		–	10	–	12	.455
St. Francis (NY)		–		–	9	–	12	.429
West Virginia		–		–	11	–	15	.423
Canisius		–		–	9	–	13	.409
Fordham		–		–	10	–	15	.400
Seton Hall		–		–	10	–	15	.400
Marshall		–		–	9	–	14	.391
Miami (FL)		–		–	9	–	17	.346
Centenary		–		–	8	–	16	.333
Pan American		–		–	8	–	16	.333
Detroit		–		–	7	–	18	.280
Tulane		–		–	5	–	18	.217
Xavier		–		–	5	–	20	.200
Navy		–		–	4	–	19	.174
Portland		–		–	4	–	22	.154
Rankings from AP Poll

The 1969–70 St. Bonaventure Brown Indians men's basketball team represented St. Bonaventure University during the 1969–70 NCAA University Division men's basketball season. The Brown Indians were independent and not a member of a conference. They were led by ninth year head coach Larry Weise as well as 6′ 11″ center Bob Lanier, named a consensus first-team All-American for the second consecutive season. He finished his career with averages of 27.6 points and 15.7 rebounds in 75 career games. St. Bonaventure advanced to the only Final Four in program history. Lanier suffered a knee injury in the Regional final against Villanova and did not play in the Final Four, but would be the top pick in the 1970 NBA draft and go on to a Hall of Fame career.

== Roster ==
1969–70 St. Bonaventure Brown Indians men's basketball team
Players
Coaches

Pos.	#	Name	Height	Weight	Year	Hometown
G	11	Bill Kalbaugh	5 ft 11 in (1.8 m)	—	Sr
C	31	Bob Lanier	6 ft 11 in (2.11 m)	265 lb (120 kg)	Sr	Buffalo, New York
F	35	Matt Gantt	6 ft 5 in (1.96 m)	—	So
F	30	Tom Baldwin	6 ft 5 in (1.96 m)	—	So
G	20	Paul Hoffman	6 ft 1 in (1.85 m)	—	So
G	33	Vic Thomas	6 ft 3 in (1.91 m)	—	So
G	15	Dale Tepas	6 ft 1 in (1.85 m)	—	Jr
F	23	Greg "Bubba" Gary	6 ft 3 in (1.91 m)	—	Jr
G	12	Gene Fahey	6 ft 1 in (1.85 m)	—	Sr
G	10	Mike Kull	6 ft 1 in (1.85 m)	—	Sr

Head coach

- Larry Weise (St. Bonaventure)

Assistant coach(es)

Legend

- (C) Team captain
- (S) Suspended
- (I) Ineligible
- (W) Walk-on
- Injured
- Current redshirt

== Schedule/results ==
Date time, TV	Rank^{#}	Opponent^{#}	Result	Record	High points	High rebounds	High assists	Site (attendance) city, state
Dec 5, 1969*	No. 17	Detroit College	W 106–54	1–0	36 – Lanier	–	–	Reilly Center; St. Bonaventure, NY
Dec 8, 1969*	No. 20	Xavier	W 82–69	2–0	–	–	–	Reilly Center; St. Bonaventure, NY
Dec 15, 1969*	No. 20	Detroit	W 97–68	3–0	–	–	–	Reilly Center; St. Bonaventure, NY
Dec 20, 1969*		Duquesne	W 77–58	4–0	21 – Lanier	21 – Lanier	–	Reilly Center (6,291); St. Bonaventure, NY
Dec 27, 1969*	No. 19	at New York University; Holiday Festival	W 107–60	5–0	33 – Lanier	–	–	Alumni Gymnasium; New York, NY
Dec 29, 1969*	No. 19	vs. Saint Joseph's; Holiday Festival	W 96–61	6–0	25 – Lanier	–	–	Madison Square Garden; New York, NY
Dec 30, 1969*	No. 12	vs. No. 17 Purdue; Holiday Festival Championship	W 91–75	7–0	50 – Lanier	15 – Lanier	–	Madison Square Garden; New York, NY
Jan 3, 1970*	No. 12	Baldwin-Wallace	W 96–63	8–0	25 – Lanier	16 – Lanier	–	Reilly Center; St. Bonaventure, NY
Jan 7, 1970*	No. 5	Loyola (MD)	W 96–52	9–0	–	24 – Lanier	–	Reilly Center; St. Bonaventure, NY
Jan 10, 1970*	No. 5	at Kent State	W 94–65	10–0	42 – Lanier	13 – Lanier	–	Memorial Gym; Kent, OH
Jan 21, 1970*	No. 4	DePaul	W 83–59	11–0	–	22 – Lanier	–	Reilly Center; St. Bonaventure, NY
Jan 24, 1970*	No. 4	at Canisius	W 62–49	12–0	–	–	–	Koessler Center; Buffalo, NY
Jan 28, 1970*	No. 3	at Villanova	L 62–64	12–1	21 – Lanier	–	–	Villanova Field House; Philadelphia, PA
Jan 31, 1970*	No. 3	Niagara	W 89–81	13–1	–	23 – Lanier	–	Reilly Center; St. Bonaventure, NY
Feb 3, 1970*	No. 3	Belmont Abbey	W 131–64	14–1	–	–	–	Reilly Center; St. Bonaventure, NY
Feb 7, 1970*	No. 4	at Toledo	W 77–71	15–1	–	–	–	The Field House; Toledo, OH
Feb 11, 1970*	No. 4	at Seton Hall	W 103–83	16–1	–	–	–	Walsh Gymnasium; South Orange, NJ
Feb 14, 1970*	No. 4	Providence	W 68–52	17–1	–	–	–	Reilly Center; St. Bonaventure, NY
Feb 18, 1970*	No. 3	at St. Francis (NY)	W 87–57	18–1	–	–	–	Pope Physical Education Center; Brooklyn, NY
Feb 21, 1970*	No. 3	Long Island	W 71–61	19–1	–	–	–	Reilly Center; St. Bonaventure, NY
Feb 25, 1970*	No. 3	Canisius	W 91–68	20–1	–	–	–	Reilly Center; St. Bonaventure, NY
Mar 1, 1970*	No. 3	vs. Niagara	W 104–68	21–1	–	–	–	Buffalo Memorial Auditorium; Buffalo, NY
Mar 5, 1970*	No. 4	at Fairfield	W 86–59	22–1	–	20 – Lanier	–	Alumni Hall; Fairfield, CT
NCAA tournament
Mar 7, 1970*	No. 4	vs. No. 10 Davidson	W 85–72	23–1	28 – Lanier	16 – Gantt	–	Carnesecca Arena (5,320); New York, NY
Mar 12, 1970*	No. 3	vs. No. 10 NC State; Regional semifinal	W 80–68	24–1	24 – Lanier	19 – Lanier	–	Carolina Coliseum (12,316); Columbia, SC
Mar 14, 1970*	No. 3	vs. Villanova; Regional final	W 97–74	25–1	26 – Lanier	18 – Gantt	–	Carolina Coliseum (10,981); Columbia, SC
Mar 19, 1970*	No. 3	vs. No. 4 Jacksonville; National semifinal	L 83–91	25–2	16 – Gantt	13 – Gary	–	Cole Fieldhouse; College Park, MD
Mar 21, 1970*	No. 3	vs. No. 5 New Mexico State; Consolation	L 73–79	25–3	22 – Gary	11 – Gary	–	Cole Fieldhouse; College Park, MD
*Non-conference game. ^{#}Rankings from AP Poll. (#) Tournament seedings in parentheses. E=East. All times are in Eastern Time.

== Rankings ==
Ranking movements Legend: ██ Increase in ranking ██ Decrease in ranking — = Not ranked
	Week														
Poll	Pre	1	2	3	4	5	6	7	8	9	10	11	12	13	Final
AP	17	20	—	19	12	5	4	4	3	4	4	3	3	4	3
Coaches	16	20	16	10	7	4	4	4	3	4	4	4	4	4	3

== Awards and honors ==
- Bob Lanier – Consensus First-Team All-American

== Team players in the 1970 NBA draft ==
Round	Pick	Player	NBA Club
1	1	Bob Lanier	Detroit Pistons
