= Robert Sassone =

Robert Sassone may refer to:

- Robert Sassone (basketball)
- Robert Sassone (cyclist)
