= 1969–70 UCLA Bruins men's basketball team =

American college basketball season

1969–70 UCLA Bruins men's basketball

NCAA tournament National champions Pac-8 champions

National Championship Game, W 80–69 vs. Jacksonville
- Conference: Pacific-8 Conference

Ranking
- Coaches: No. 2
- AP: No. 2
- Record: 28–2 (12–2 Pac-8)
- Head coach: John Wooden (22nd season)
- Assistant coaches: Denny Crum; Gary Cunningham
- Captain: John Vallely
- Home arena: Pauley Pavilion

1969–70 Pacific–8 Conference men's basketball standings
	Conf.				Overall
Team	W		L	PCT	W		L	PCT
No. 2 UCLA	12	–	2	.857	28	–	2	.933
Washington State	9	–	5	.643	19	–	7	.731
No. 20 USC	9	–	5	.643	18	–	8	.692
Oregon	8	–	6	.571	17	–	9	.654
Washington	7	–	7	.500	17	–	9	.654
California	5	–	9	.357	11	–	15	.423
Oregon State	4	–	10	.286	10	–	16	.385
Stanford	2	–	12	.143	5	–	20	.200
Rankings from AP Poll

The 1969–70 UCLA Bruins men's basketball team won its fourth consecutive NCAA National Basketball Championship, the sixth in seven years under head coach John Wooden, despite the departure of Lew Alcindor to the NBA, with a win over Jacksonville.

The team was honored forty years later in 2010, at halftime of the UCLA vs Oregon game on February 27.

== Players ==
1969–70 UCLA Bruins men's basketball team
Players
Coaches

Pos.	#	Name	Height	Weight	Year	Hometown
G/F	24	Rick Betchley	6 ft 4 in (1.93 m)	—	So
G	45	Henry Bibby	6 ft 1 in (1.85 m)	185 lb (84 kg)	So	Franklinton, North Carolina
G/F	23	Kenny Booker	6 ft 3 in (1.91 m)	185 lb (84 kg)	Jr	Long Beach, California
C	34	Jon Chapman	6 ft 6 in (1.98 m)	—	So
F	52	John Ecker	6 ft 6 in (1.98 m)	—	Jr
G	25	Andy Hill	6 ft 1 in (1.85 m)	—	So	Los Angeles, California
C	32	Steve Patterson	6 ft 9 in (2.06 m)	225 lb (102 kg)	Jr	Riverside, California
F	30	Curtis Rowe	6 ft 6 in (1.98 m)	225 lb (102 kg)	Jr	Bessemer, Alabama
G	42	Terry Schofield	6 ft 3 in (1.91 m)	—	Jr	Los Angeles, California
F	54	Bill Seibert	6 ft 6 in (1.98 m)	—	Jr
G	40	John Vallely	6 ft 2 in (1.88 m)	185 lb (84 kg)	Sr	Newport Beach, California
F	35	Sidney Wicks	6 ft 8 in (2.03 m)	225 lb (102 kg)	Jr	Los Angeles, California

Head coach

John Wooden (Purdue)

Assistant coach(es)

- Denny Crum (UCLA)
- Gary Cunningham (UCLA)

Legend

- (C) Team captain
- (S) Suspended
- (I) Ineligible
- (W) Walk-on
- Injured
- Current redshirt

Roster

== Coaches ==
- Head Coach: John Wooden
- Assistants: Denny Crum and Gary Cunningham
- Athletic Trainer: Elvin C. "Ducky" Drake
- Head Student Manager: George Morgan

== Schedule ==
Date time, TV	Rank^{#}	Opponent^{#}	Result	Record	Site city, state
Regular Season
December 1, 1969*	No. 4	Arizona	W 90–65	1–0	Pauley Pavilion; Los Angeles, CA
December 6, 1969*	No. 4	at Minnesota	W 72–71	2–0	Williams Arena; Minneapolis, MN
December 12, 1969*	No. 2	Miami (FL)	W 127–69	3–0	Pauley Pavilion; Los Angeles, CA
December 13, 1969*	No. 2	LSU	W 133–84	4–0	Pauley Pavilion; Los Angeles, CA
December 23, 1969*	No. 2	Texas	W 99–54	5–0	Pauley Pavilion; Los Angeles, CA
December 27, 1969*	No. 2	Georgia Tech; Bruin Classic	W 121–90	6–0	Pauley Pavilion; Los Angeles, CA
December 29, 1969*	No. 2	Princeton; Bruin Classic	W 76–75	7–0	Pauley Pavilion; Los Angeles, CA
January 3, 1970*	No. 2	No. 13 Notre Dame	W 108–77	8–0	Pauley Pavilion; Los Angeles, CA
January 9, 1970	No. 1	Oregon	W 75–58	9–0 (1–0)	Pauley Pavilion; Los Angeles, CA
January 10, 1970	No. 1	Oregon State	W 72–71	10–0 (2–0)	Pauley Pavilion; Los Angeles, CA
January 16, 1970*	No. 1	vs. Bradley	W 61–58	11–0	Chicago Stadium; Chicago, Illinois
January 17, 1970*	No. 1	at Loyola–Chicago	W 94–72	12–0	Chicago Stadium; Chicago, IL
January 23, 1970*	No. 1	UC Santa Barbara	W 89–80	13–0	Pauley Pavilion; Los Angeles, CA
January 24, 1970*	No. 1	Wyoming	W 115–77	14–0	Pauley Pavilion; Los Angeles, CA
January 30, 1970	No. 1	at California	W 87–72	15–0 (3–0)	Harmon Gym; Berkeley, CA
January 31, 1970	No. 1	at Stanford	W 102–84	16–0 (4–0)	Maples Pavilion; Stanford, CA
February 7, 1970	No. 1	at Washington	W 66–56	17–0 (5–0)	Hec Edmundson Pavilion; Seattle, WA
February 9, 1970	No. 1	at Washington State	W 95–61	18–0 (6–0)	Bohler Gymnasium; Pullman, WA
February 13, 1970	No. 1	Washington State	W 95–61	19–0 (7–0)	Pauley Pavilion; Los Angeles, CA
February 14, 1970	No. 1	Washington	W 101–85	20–0 (8–0)	Pauley Pavilion; Los Angeles, CA
February 20, 1970	No. 1	at Oregon State	W 71–56	21–0 (9–0)	Gill Coliseum; Corvallis, OR
February 21, 1970	No. 1	at Oregon	L 65–78	21–1 (9–1)	McArthur Court; Eugene, OR
February 27, 1970	No. 2	Stanford	W 120–90	22–1 (10–1)	Pauley Pavilion; Los Angeles, CA
February 28, 1970	No. 2	California	W 109—95	23–1 (11–1)	Pauley Pavilion; Los Angeles, CA
March 6, 1970	No. 1	USC	L 86–87	23–2 (11–2)	Pauley Pavilion; Los Angeles, CA
March 7, 1970	No. 1	at USC	W 91–78	24–2 (12–2)	Los Angeles Memorial Sports Arena; Los Angeles, CA
NCAA Tournament
March 12, 1970*; 9:05 pm	No. 2	vs. Long Beach State; Regional semifinal	W 88–65	25–2	Hec Edmundson Pavilion (5,500); Seattle, WA
March 14, 1970*; 3:05 pm	No. 2	vs. No. 16 Utah State; Regional Final	W 101–79	26–2	Hec Edmundson Pavilion (4,200); Seattle, WA
March 19, 1970*; 6:40 pm, NBC	No. 2	vs. No. 5 New Mexico State; National semifinal	W 93–77	27–2	Cole Field House (14,380); College Park, MD
March 21, 1970*; 1:00 pm, NBC	No. 2	vs. No. 4 Jacksonville; National Final	W 80–69	28–2	Cole Field House (14,380); College Park, MD
*Non-conference game. ^{#}Rankings from AP Poll. (#) Tournament seedings in parentheses. All times are in Pacific time.

== Rankings ==
Ranking movements Legend: ██ Increase in ranking ██ Decrease in ranking
	Week														
Poll	Pre	1	2	3	4	5	6	7	8	9	10	11	12	13	Final
AP	4	2	2	2	2	2	2	2	1	1	1	1	2	1	2
Coaches	1	2	2	2	2	2	2	2	1	1	1	1	1	1	2

== Notes ==
- Sidney Wicks was named to the 1970 All-America roster's second team.
- 1970 – Sidney Wicks received national co-player of the year honors from the Helms Athletic Foundation
- At the conclusion of the season, the team collectively signed a letter to President Nixon condemning the Vietnam War and the administration's actions at home.
- The Bruin Classic was held on Dec. 27 and Dec. 29 with Georgia Tech and Princeton.
- In defeating LSU, UCLA forced Pete Maravich to commit 18 turnovers.
