= 1969–70 St. John's Redmen basketball team =

American college basketball season

1969–70 St. John's Redmen men's basketball

1970 NIT, Second Place
- Conference: Independent
- Record: 21–8
- Head coach: Lou Carnesecca
- Assistant coach: John Kresse
- Captain: Joe DePre
- Home arena: Alumni Hall; Madison Square Garden

1969–70 NCAA University Division men's basketball independents standings
	Conf.				Overall
Team	W		L	PCT	W		L	PCT
No. 4 Jacksonville		–		–	27	–	2	.931
No. 5 New Mexico State		–		–	27	–	3	.900
No. 8 Marquette		–		–	26	–	3	.897
No. 3 St. Bonaventure		–		–	25	–	3	.893
No. 11 Florida State		–		–	23	–	3	.885
No. 12 Houston		–		–	25	–	5	.833
Army		–		–	22	–	6	.786
No. 17 Niagara		–		–	22	–	7	.759
No. 16 Utah State		–		–	22	–	7	.759
Villanova		–		–	22	–	7	.759
No. 9 Notre Dame		–		–	21	–	8	.724
St. John's		–		–	21	–	8	.724
Georgetown		–		–	18	–	7	.720
Duquesne		–		–	17	–	7	.708
Dayton		–		–	19	–	8	.704
Manhattan		–		–	18	–	8	.692
Hardin–Simmons		–		–	17	–	9	.654
Holy Cross		–		–	16	–	9	.640
Long Island		–		–	16	–	9	.640
Georgia Tech		–		–	17	–	10	.630
Creighton		–		–	15	–	10	.600
Seattle		–		–	15	–	10	.600
Boston University		–		–	14	–	10	.583
Butler		–		–	15	–	11	.577
Oklahoma City		–		–	17	–	13	.567
Fairleigh Dickinson		–		–	13	–	10	.565
Southern Illinois		–		–	13	–	10	.565
Colgate		–		–	14	–	11	.560
Providence		–		–	14	–	11	.560
Denver		–		–	13	–	11	.542
Loyola (IL)		–		–	13	–	11	.542
Penn State		–		–	13	–	11	.542
Rutgers		–		–	13	–	11	.542
Saint Peter's		–		–	13	–	11	.542
Northern Illinois		–		–	13	–	12	.520
Air Force		–		–	12	–	12	.500
Fairfield		–		–	12	–	12	.500
Iona		–		–	12	–	12	.500
NYU		–		–	12	–	12	.500
Pittsburgh		–		–	12	–	12	.500
Saint Francis (PA)		–		–	12	–	12	.500
Syracuse		–		–	12	–	12	.500
DePaul		–		–	12	–	13	.480
West Texas State		–		–	12	–	13	.480
Loyola (LA)		–		–	12	–	14	.462
Boston College		–		–	11	–	13	.458
Virginia Tech		–		–	10	–	12	.455
St. Francis (NY)		–		–	9	–	12	.429
West Virginia		–		–	11	–	15	.423
Canisius		–		–	9	–	13	.409
Fordham		–		–	10	–	15	.400
Seton Hall		–		–	10	–	15	.400
Marshall		–		–	9	–	14	.391
Miami (FL)		–		–	9	–	17	.346
Centenary		–		–	8	–	16	.333
Pan American		–		–	8	–	16	.333
Detroit		–		–	7	–	18	.280
Tulane		–		–	5	–	18	.217
Xavier		–		–	5	–	20	.200
Navy		–		–	4	–	19	.174
Portland		–		–	4	–	22	.154
Rankings from AP Poll

The 1969–70 St. John's Redmen basketball team represented St. John's University during the 1969–70 NCAA University Division men's basketball season. The team was coached by Lou Carnesecca in his fifth year at the school before he left to become the head coach of the New York Nets in the American Basketball Association. St. John's home games were played at Alumni Hall and Madison Square Garden.

The Redmen reached the championship game of the National Invitation Tournament, where they lost to Marquette.

== Roster ==
#	Name	Height	Position	Class	Hometown	Previous School(s)	GP	PPG	RPG
5	Richie Lyons	6'0"	G	SO	New Hyde Park, NY	Holy Cross HS	29	5.5	1.1
10	Jim Smyth	6'5"	G/F	SR	Brooklyn, NY	St. John's Prep	29	10.9	2.3
11	Billy Paultz	6'11"	C	JR	River Edge, NJ	Cameron Junior College	29	15.8	14.4
15	Ralph Abraham	6'5"	F	SR	Brooklyn, NY	St. John's Prep	29	10.3	7.3
20	Mike Keilty	6'4"	G	SO	Woodside, NY	Holy Trinity HS	16	1.4	1.4
22	Neil Levane	6'2"	G	JR	Great Neck, NY	Great Neck South HS	8	2.0	0.5
24	Bill Phillips	7'0"	C	SO	Hollis, NY	Jamaica HS	10	1.0	2.0
25	Pete LaMantia (I)	6'3"	G/F	JR	Bayside, NY	Bishop Reilly HS	2	4.5	1.5
34	Richard Gilkes	6'6"	G/F	JR	Westbury, NY	Westbury HS	28	2.5	2.3
35	John DeVasto	6'0"	G	JR	Bronx, NY	Loyola School	20	1.9	0.5
44	Greg Cluess	6'8"	F/C	SO	West Hempstead, NY	St. Agnes HS	27	2.7	2.1
55	Joe DePre (C)	6'3"	G	SR	Westbury, NY	Westbury HS	29	16.5	5.8

== Schedule and results ==
Date time, TV	Rank^{#}	Opponent^{#}	Result	Record	Site city, state
Regular Season
12/02/69*	No. 14	at Temple	L 59-60	0-1	McGonigle Hall; Philadelphia, PA
12/04/69*	No. 14	Harvard	W 73-62	1-1	Alumni Hall; Queens, NY
12/09/69*		at West Virginia	W 76-60	2-1	Stansbury Hall; Morgantown, WV
12/13/69*		Seton Hall	W 83-64	3-1	Alumni Hall; Queens, NY
12/15/69*		at Georgetown	W 71-64	4-1	McDonough Gymnasium; Washington, D.C.
12/19/69*		No. 4 Davidson	W 74-62	5-1	Alumni Hall; Queens, NY
12/22/69*		at Stanford	W 63-59	6-1	Maples Pavilion; Stanford, CA
12/23/69*		at No. 12 Southern California	L 59-95	6-2	LA Sports Arena; Los Angeles, CA
12/26/69*		vs. Iowa; Rainbow Classic	W 57-55	7-2	Neil S. Blaisdell Arena; Honolulu, HI
12/29/69*		vs. Louisiana State; Rainbow Classic	L 70-78	7-3	Neil S. Blaisdell Arena; Honolulu, HI
12/30/69*		vs. San Francisco; Rainbow Classic	L 60-67	7-4	Neil S. Blaisdell Arena; Honolulu, HI
01/10/70*		Syracuse	W 86-72	8-4	Alumni Hall; Queens, NY
01/17/70*		St. Francis	W 89-65	9-4	Alumni Hall; Queens, NY
01/24/70*		Villanova	W 60-57	10-4	Alumni Hall; Queens, NY
01/28/70*		at Providence	L 57-58 ^{OT}	10-5	Alumni Hall; Providence, RI
01/31/70*		Pittsburgh	W 67-58	11-5	Alumni Hall; Queens, NY
02/03/70 & 02/04/70*		at Rhode Island	W 85-67	12-5	Keaney Gymnasium; Kingston, RI
02/07/70*		Army	W 54-44	13-5	Alumni Hall; Queens, NY
02/10/70*		at No. 16 Notre Dame	L 76-90	13-6	Athletic & Convocation Center; Notre Dame, IN
02/14/70*		Fordham	W 80-53	14-6	Alumni Hall; Queens, NY
02/18/70*		St. Joseph's	W 47-46	15-6	Alumni Hall; Queens, NY
02/21/70*		at Niagara	L 70-72	15-7	NU Student Center; Lewiston, NY
02/24/70*		Holy Cross	W 75-62	16-7	Alumni Hall; Queens, NY
02/28/70*		NYU	W 64-53	17-7	Alumni Hall; Queens, NY
03/02/70*		at Boston College	W 71-64	18-7	Roberts Center; Chestnut Hill, MA
NIT Tournament
03/13/70*		vs. Miami (OH); NIT First Round	W 70-57	19-7	Madison Square Garden; New York, NY
03/16/70*		vs. Georgia Tech; NIT Quarterfinal	W 56-55	20-7	Madison Square Garden; New York, NY
03/19/70*		vs. Army; NIT Semifinal	W 60-59	21-7	Madison Square Garden; New York, NY
03/21/70*		vs. No. 8 Marquette; NIT Championship	L 53-65	21-8	Madison Square Garden; New York, NY
*Non-conference game. ^{#}Rankings from AP Poll. (#) Tournament seedings in parentheses.

== Team players drafted into the NBA ==
Round	Pick	Player	NBA club
2	29	Joe DePre	Phoenix Suns
7	103	Billy Paultz	San Diego Rockets
