= 1969–70 Houston Cougars men's basketball team =

American college basketball season

1969–70 Houston Cougars men's basketball
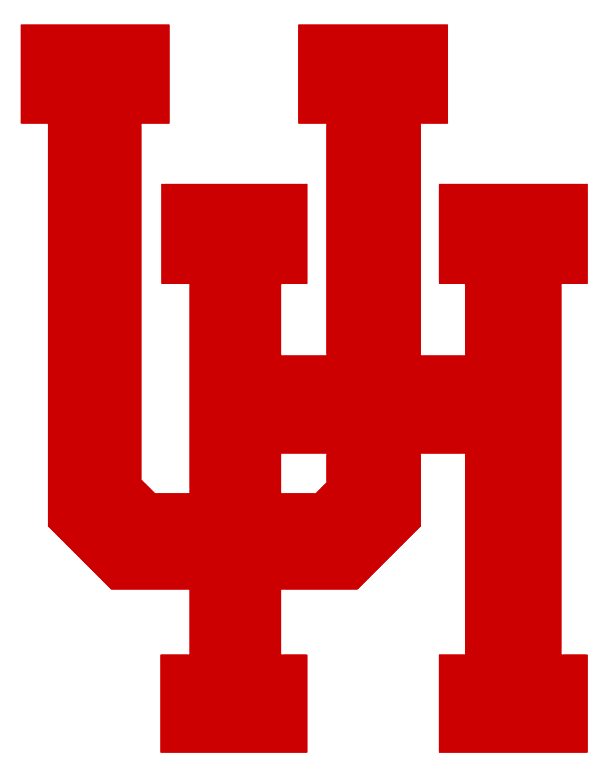

NCAA tournament, Regional Semifinals
- Conference: Independent

Ranking
- Coaches: No. 11
- AP: No. 12
- Record: 25–5
- Head coach: Guy Lewis (14th season)
- Assistant coaches: Harvey Pate; Don Schverak
- Home arena: Hofheinz Pavilion

1969–70 NCAA University Division men's basketball independents standings
	Conf.				Overall
Team	W		L	PCT	W		L	PCT
No. 4 Jacksonville		–		–	27	–	2	.931
No. 5 New Mexico State		–		–	27	–	3	.900
No. 8 Marquette		–		–	26	–	3	.897
No. 3 St. Bonaventure		–		–	25	–	3	.893
No. 11 Florida State		–		–	23	–	3	.885
No. 12 Houston		–		–	25	–	5	.833
Army		–		–	22	–	6	.786
No. 17 Niagara		–		–	22	–	7	.759
No. 16 Utah State		–		–	22	–	7	.759
Villanova		–		–	22	–	7	.759
No. 9 Notre Dame		–		–	21	–	8	.724
St. John's		–		–	21	–	8	.724
Georgetown		–		–	18	–	7	.720
Duquesne		–		–	17	–	7	.708
Dayton		–		–	19	–	8	.704
Manhattan		–		–	18	–	8	.692
Hardin–Simmons		–		–	17	–	9	.654
Holy Cross		–		–	16	–	9	.640
Long Island		–		–	16	–	9	.640
Georgia Tech		–		–	17	–	10	.630
Creighton		–		–	15	–	10	.600
Seattle		–		–	15	–	10	.600
Boston University		–		–	14	–	10	.583
Butler		–		–	15	–	11	.577
Oklahoma City		–		–	17	–	13	.567
Fairleigh Dickinson		–		–	13	–	10	.565
Southern Illinois		–		–	13	–	10	.565
Colgate		–		–	14	–	11	.560
Providence		–		–	14	–	11	.560
Denver		–		–	13	–	11	.542
Loyola (IL)		–		–	13	–	11	.542
Penn State		–		–	13	–	11	.542
Rutgers		–		–	13	–	11	.542
Saint Peter's		–		–	13	–	11	.542
Northern Illinois		–		–	13	–	12	.520
Air Force		–		–	12	–	12	.500
Fairfield		–		–	12	–	12	.500
Iona		–		–	12	–	12	.500
NYU		–		–	12	–	12	.500
Pittsburgh		–		–	12	–	12	.500
Saint Francis (PA)		–		–	12	–	12	.500
Syracuse		–		–	12	–	12	.500
DePaul		–		–	12	–	13	.480
West Texas State		–		–	12	–	13	.480
Loyola (LA)		–		–	12	–	14	.462
Boston College		–		–	11	–	13	.458
Virginia Tech		–		–	10	–	12	.455
St. Francis (NY)		–		–	9	–	12	.429
West Virginia		–		–	11	–	15	.423
Canisius		–		–	9	–	13	.409
Fordham		–		–	10	–	15	.400
Seton Hall		–		–	10	–	15	.400
Marshall		–		–	9	–	14	.391
Miami (FL)		–		–	9	–	17	.346
Centenary		–		–	8	–	16	.333
Pan American		–		–	8	–	16	.333
Detroit		–		–	7	–	18	.280
Tulane		–		–	5	–	18	.217
Xavier		–		–	5	–	20	.200
Navy		–		–	4	–	19	.174
Portland		–		–	4	–	22	.154
Rankings from AP Poll

The 1969–70 Houston Cougars men's basketball team represented the University of Houston in NCAA University Division competition in the 1969–70 season.

Houston, coached by Guy Lewis, played its home games in the Hofheinz Pavilion in Houston, Texas, and was then an Independent.

== Roster ==
1969–70 Houston Cougars men's basketball team
Players
Coaches

Pos.	#	Name	Height	Weight	Year	Previous school	Hometown
G	20	Tom Gribben	6 ft 2 in (1.88 m)	180 lb (82 kg)	Sr		Berwyn, Illinois
G	22	Ollie Taylor	6 ft 2 in (1.88 m)	194 lb (88 kg)	Sr	San Jacinto CC	New York City, New York
G	24	Poo Welch	6 ft 3 in (1.91 m)	—	Jr	Tyler JC	Lake Charles, Louisiana
C	34	Mars Evans	6 ft 10 in (2.08 m)	250 lb (113 kg)	Sr		New York City, New York
F	42	Dwight Davis	6 ft 8 in (2.03 m)	220 lb (100 kg)	So	Worthing HS	Houston, Texas

Head coach

- Guy Lewis (Houston)

Assistant coach(es)

- Harvey Pate (Oklahoma State)
- Don Schverak (Houston)

Legend

- (C) Team captain
- (S) Suspended
- (I) Ineligible
- (W) Walk-on
- Injured
- Current redshirt

Roster

== Schedule and results ==
Date time, TV	Rank^{#}	Opponent^{#}	Result	Record	Site city, state
Regular season
Dec 1, 1969	No. 20	Southwestern Louisiana	W 89–72	1–0	Hofheinz Pavilion; Houston, Texas
Dec 4, 1969	No. 20	Texas–Arlington	W 88–70	2–0	Hofheinz Pavilion; Houston, Texas
Dec 6, 1969	No. 20	Centenary (LA)	W 70–64	3–0	Hofheinz Pavilion; Houston, Texas
Dec 12, 1969		Nebraska; Bluebonnet Classic	W 112–82	4–0	Hofheinz Pavilion; Houston, Texas
Dec 13, 1969		Kent State; Bluebonnet Classic	W 74–66	5–0	Hofheinz Pavilion; Houston, Texas
Dec 15, 1969	No. 19	Loyola Marymount	W 116–91	6–0	Hofheinz Pavilion; Houston, Texas
Dec 17, 1969	No. 19	No. 11 Santa Clara	W 91–76	7–0	Hofheinz Pavilion; Houston, Texas
Dec 20, 1969	No. 19	No. 13 USC	W 77–73	8–0	Hofheinz Pavilion; Houston, Texas
Dec 22, 1969	No. 8	Long Beach State	W 76–69	9–0	Hofheinz Pavilion; Houston, Texas
Dec 29, 1969	No. 8	vs. Santa Clara; UNLV Invitational	L 63–85	9–1	Las Vegas Convention Center; Las Vegas, Nevada
Dec 30, 1969	No. 8	vs. UC Santa Barbara; UNLV Invitational	W 98–85	10–1	Las Vegas Convention Center; Las Vegas, Nevada
Jan 3, 1970	No. 8	at Hawaii	W 116–84	11–1	Neal S. Blaisdell Center; Honolulu, Hawaii
Jan 10, 1970	No. 11	West Texas State	W 91–83	12–1	Hofheinz Pavilion; Houston, Texas
Jan 24, 1970	No. 7	at St. Mary's	L 66–76	12–2	Unknown; San Antonio, Texas
Jan 27, 1970	No. 12	at Seattle	W 92–88	13–2	Seattle Center Coliseum; Seattle, Washington
Jan 30, 1970	No. 12	at Montana State	W 82–69	14–2	MSU Fieldhouse; Bozeman, Montana
Jan 31, 1970	No. 12	at Utah State	L 84–91	14–3	George Nelson Fieldhouse; Logan, Utah
Feb 5, 1970	No. 16	St. Mary's	W 118–77	15–3	Hofheinz Pavilion; Houston, Texas
Feb 7, 1970	No. 16	Creighton	W 78–77 ^{2OT}	16–3	Hofheinz Pavilion; Houston, Texas
Feb 12, 1970	No. 15	Hardin–Simmons	W 109–92	17–3	Hofheinz Pavilion; Houston, Texas
Feb 14, 1970	No. 15	Miami (FL)	W 118–98	18–3	Hofheinz Pavilion; Houston, Texas
Feb 19, 1970	No. 15	Loyola (LA)	W 99–80	19–3	Hofheinz Pavilion; Houston, Texas
Feb 21, 1970	No. 15	at Centenary (LA)	W 97–72	20–3	Hirsch Memorial Coliseum; Shreveport, Louisiana
Feb 26, 1970	No. 15	at Texas–Arlington	W 102–84	21–3	Texas Hall; Arlington, Texas
Feb 28, 1970	No. 15	South Alabama	W 128–90	22–3	Hofheinz Pavilion; Houston, Texas
Mar 2, 1970	No. 13	at West Texas State	W 96–80	23–3	West Texas State Fieldhouse; Canyon, Texas
Mar 4, 1970	No. 13	at Creighton	W 62–58	24–3	Omaha Civic Auditorium; Omaha, Nebraska
NCAA tournament
Mar 7, 1970	No. 13	vs. Dayton; Regional quarterfinals – First round	W 71–64	25–3	Daniel-Meyer Coliseum; Fort Worth, Texas
Mar 13, 1970	No. 12	vs. No. 14 Drake; Regional semifinals – Sweet Sixteen	L 87–92	25–4	Allen Fieldhouse; Lawrence, Kansas
Mar 14, 1970	No. 12	vs. Kansas State; Regional third-place game	L 98–107	25–5	Allen Fieldhouse; Lawrence, Kansas
*Non-conference game. ^{#}Rankings from AP Poll. (#) Tournament seedings in parentheses. All times are in Central Time.

== Rankings ==
Ranking movements Legend: ██ Increase in ranking ██ Decrease in ranking — = Not ranked
	Week														
Poll	Pre	1	2	3	4	5	6	7	8	9	10	11	12	13	Final
AP	20	—	19	8	8	11	9	7	12	16	15	15	15	13	12
Coaches	—	—	20	5	9	8	8	7	10	20	13	14	11	11	11
