= 1969–70 Duquesne Dukes men's basketball team =

American college basketball season

1969–70 Duquesne Dukes men's basketball

NIT
- Conference: Independent
- Record: 17–7
- Head coach: Red Manning (12th season)
- Home arena: Civic Arena

1969–70 NCAA University Division men's basketball independents standings
	Conf.				Overall
Team	W		L	PCT	W		L	PCT
No. 4 Jacksonville		–		–	27	–	2	.931
No. 5 New Mexico State		–		–	27	–	3	.900
No. 8 Marquette		–		–	26	–	3	.897
No. 3 St. Bonaventure		–		–	25	–	3	.893
No. 11 Florida State		–		–	23	–	3	.885
No. 12 Houston		–		–	25	–	5	.833
Army		–		–	22	–	6	.786
No. 17 Niagara		–		–	22	–	7	.759
No. 16 Utah State		–		–	22	–	7	.759
Villanova		–		–	22	–	7	.759
No. 9 Notre Dame		–		–	21	–	8	.724
St. John's		–		–	21	–	8	.724
Georgetown		–		–	18	–	7	.720
Duquesne		–		–	17	–	7	.708
Dayton		–		–	19	–	8	.704
Manhattan		–		–	18	–	8	.692
Hardin–Simmons		–		–	17	–	9	.654
Holy Cross		–		–	16	–	9	.640
Long Island		–		–	16	–	9	.640
Georgia Tech		–		–	17	–	10	.630
Creighton		–		–	15	–	10	.600
Seattle		–		–	15	–	10	.600
Boston University		–		–	14	–	10	.583
Butler		–		–	15	–	11	.577
Oklahoma City		–		–	17	–	13	.567
Fairleigh Dickinson		–		–	13	–	10	.565
Southern Illinois		–		–	13	–	10	.565
Colgate		–		–	14	–	11	.560
Providence		–		–	14	–	11	.560
Denver		–		–	13	–	11	.542
Loyola (IL)		–		–	13	–	11	.542
Penn State		–		–	13	–	11	.542
Rutgers		–		–	13	–	11	.542
Saint Peter's		–		–	13	–	11	.542
Northern Illinois		–		–	13	–	12	.520
Air Force		–		–	12	–	12	.500
Fairfield		–		–	12	–	12	.500
Iona		–		–	12	–	12	.500
NYU		–		–	12	–	12	.500
Pittsburgh		–		–	12	–	12	.500
Saint Francis (PA)		–		–	12	–	12	.500
Syracuse		–		–	12	–	12	.500
DePaul		–		–	12	–	13	.480
West Texas State		–		–	12	–	13	.480
Loyola (LA)		–		–	12	–	14	.462
Boston College		–		–	11	–	13	.458
Virginia Tech		–		–	10	–	12	.455
St. Francis (NY)		–		–	9	–	12	.429
West Virginia		–		–	11	–	15	.423
Canisius		–		–	9	–	13	.409
Fordham		–		–	10	–	15	.400
Seton Hall		–		–	10	–	15	.400
Marshall		–		–	9	–	14	.391
Miami (FL)		–		–	9	–	17	.346
Centenary		–		–	8	–	16	.333
Pan American		–		–	8	–	16	.333
Detroit		–		–	7	–	18	.280
Tulane		–		–	5	–	18	.217
Xavier		–		–	5	–	20	.200
Navy		–		–	4	–	19	.174
Portland		–		–	4	–	22	.154
Rankings from AP Poll

The 1969–70 Duquesne Dukes men's basketball team represented Duquesne University in 1969–70 NCAA University Division men's basketball season.

== Roster ==
1969–70 Duquesne Dukes men's basketball team
Players
Coaches

Pos.	#	Name	Height	Weight	Year	Hometown
G	35	Mike Barr	6 ft 3 in (1.91 m)	165 lb (75 kg)	So	Canton, Ohio
F	30	Mickey Davis	6 ft 7 in (2.01 m)	195 lb (88 kg)	So	Monaca, Pennsylvania
G	23	Steve McHugh	6 ft 0 in (1.83 m)	157 lb (71 kg)	Jr	Geneva, Ohio
C	52	Barry Nelson	6 ft 10 in (2.08 m)	236 lb (107 kg)	Jr	Blawnox, Pennsylvania
C	54	Gray Nelson	6 ft 10 in (2.08 m)	240 lb (109 kg)	Jr	Blawnox, Pennsylvania
G	15	Bill Zopf	6 ft 2 in (1.88 m)	165 lb (75 kg)	Sr	Monaca, Pennsylvania

Head coach

- Red Manning

Assistant coach(es)

Legend

- (C) Team captain
- (S) Suspended
- (I) Ineligible
- (W) Walk-on
- Injured
- Current redshirt

== Schedule ==
Date time, TV	Rank^{#}	Opponent^{#}	Result	Record	Site city, state
December 1		St. Vincent	W 123–55	1–0	Civic Arena; Pittsburgh, Pennsylvania
December 5		Marshall; Steel Bowl	W 120–75	2–0	Civic Arena; Pittsburgh, Pennsylvania
December 6		Miami; Steel Bowl	W 94–88	3–0	Civic Arena; Pittsburgh, Pennsylvania
December 9		at Nebraska	L 77–82	3–1	Nebraska Coliseum; Lincoln, Nebraska
December 11	No. 7	at Iowa	L 87–98	3–2	Iowa Field House; Iowa City, Iowa
December 15	No. 7	Western Kentucky	W 87–65	4–2	Civic Arena; Pittsburgh, Pennsylvania
December 20		at St. Bonaventure	L 58–77	4–3	Reilly Center (6,291); St. Bonaventure, NY
December 23		at Kent State	L 69–77	4–4	Memorial Athletic and Convocation Center; Kent, Ohio
January 5		American	W 103–64	5–4	Civic Arena; Pittsburgh, Pennsylvania
January 10		at Detroit	W 81–50	6–4	Calihan Hall; Detroit, Michigan
January 17		vs. Notre Dame	L 66–82	6–5	Chicago Stadium; Chicago, Illinois
January 25		La Salle	W 67–64	7–5	Civic Arena; Pittsburgh, Pennsylvania
January 29		Kentucky Wesleyan	W 83–67	8–5	Civic Arena; Pittsburgh, Pennsylvania
January 31		vs. Long Island	W 50–48	9–5	Madison Square Garden; New York City, NY
February 4		at Holy Cross	W 82–72	10–5	Worcester Auditorium; Worcester, Massachusetts
February 7		Providence	W 70–66	11–5	Civic Arena; Pittsburgh, Pennsylvania
February 11		at DePaul	W 100–76	12–5	Alumni Hall; Chicago, Illinois
February 15		Fairfield	W 101–62	13–5	Civic Arena; Pittsburgh, Pennsylvania
February 18		at Villanova	L 83–94	13–6	Villanova Field House
February 22		Boston College	W 105–72	14–6	Civic Arena; Pittsburgh, Pennsylvania
February 25		Xavier	W 105–63	15–6	Civic Arena; Pittsburgh, Pennsylvania
February 27		Steubenville	W 81–51	16–6	Civic Arena; Pittsburgh, Pennsylvania
March 1		Saint Francis (PA)	W 94–62	17–6	Civic Arena; Pittsburgh, Pennsylvania
NIT
March 13		vs. Georgia Tech; First Round	L 68–78	17–7	Madison Square Garden; New York City, NY
*Non-conference game. ^{#}Rankings from AP Poll. (#) Tournament seedings in parentheses.

== Team players drafted into the NBA ==
Round	Pick	Player	NBA Club
2	33	Bill Zopf	Milwaukee Bucks
