= 1969–70 Notre Dame Fighting Irish men's basketball team =

American college basketball season

1969–70 Notre Dame Fighting Irish men's basketball

NCAA Tournament, Regional 4th Place
- Conference: Independent

Ranking
- Coaches: No. 8
- AP: No. 9
- Record: 21–8
- Head coach: John Dee (6th season)
- Home arena: Joyce Center

1969–70 NCAA University Division men's basketball independents standings
	Conf.				Overall
Team	W		L	PCT	W		L	PCT
No. 4 Jacksonville		–		–	27	–	2	.931
No. 5 New Mexico State		–		–	27	–	3	.900
No. 8 Marquette		–		–	26	–	3	.897
No. 3 St. Bonaventure		–		–	25	–	3	.893
No. 11 Florida State		–		–	23	–	3	.885
No. 12 Houston		–		–	25	–	5	.833
Army		–		–	22	–	6	.786
No. 17 Niagara		–		–	22	–	7	.759
No. 16 Utah State		–		–	22	–	7	.759
Villanova		–		–	22	–	7	.759
No. 9 Notre Dame		–		–	21	–	8	.724
St. John's		–		–	21	–	8	.724
Georgetown		–		–	18	–	7	.720
Duquesne		–		–	17	–	7	.708
Dayton		–		–	19	–	8	.704
Manhattan		–		–	18	–	8	.692
Hardin–Simmons		–		–	17	–	9	.654
Holy Cross		–		–	16	–	9	.640
Long Island		–		–	16	–	9	.640
Georgia Tech		–		–	17	–	10	.630
Creighton		–		–	15	–	10	.600
Seattle		–		–	15	–	10	.600
Boston University		–		–	14	–	10	.583
Butler		–		–	15	–	11	.577
Oklahoma City		–		–	17	–	13	.567
Fairleigh Dickinson		–		–	13	–	10	.565
Southern Illinois		–		–	13	–	10	.565
Colgate		–		–	14	–	11	.560
Providence		–		–	14	–	11	.560
Denver		–		–	13	–	11	.542
Loyola (IL)		–		–	13	–	11	.542
Penn State		–		–	13	–	11	.542
Rutgers		–		–	13	–	11	.542
Saint Peter's		–		–	13	–	11	.542
Northern Illinois		–		–	13	–	12	.520
Air Force		–		–	12	–	12	.500
Fairfield		–		–	12	–	12	.500
Iona		–		–	12	–	12	.500
NYU		–		–	12	–	12	.500
Pittsburgh		–		–	12	–	12	.500
Saint Francis (PA)		–		–	12	–	12	.500
Syracuse		–		–	12	–	12	.500
DePaul		–		–	12	–	13	.480
West Texas State		–		–	12	–	13	.480
Loyola (LA)		–		–	12	–	14	.462
Boston College		–		–	11	–	13	.458
Virginia Tech		–		–	10	–	12	.455
St. Francis (NY)		–		–	9	–	12	.429
West Virginia		–		–	11	–	15	.423
Canisius		–		–	9	–	13	.409
Fordham		–		–	10	–	15	.400
Seton Hall		–		–	10	–	15	.400
Marshall		–		–	9	–	14	.391
Miami (FL)		–		–	9	–	17	.346
Centenary		–		–	8	–	16	.333
Pan American		–		–	8	–	16	.333
Detroit		–		–	7	–	18	.280
Tulane		–		–	5	–	18	.217
Xavier		–		–	5	–	20	.200
Navy		–		–	4	–	19	.174
Portland		–		–	4	–	22	.154
Rankings from AP Poll

The 1969–70 Notre Dame Fighting Irish men's basketball team represented the University of Notre Dame during the 1969–70 season. The team was led by 6th-year head coach John Dee and played their home games at the Joyce Center. Notre Dame made the NCAA tournament for the third straight season, reaching the Sweet Sixteen before finishing fourth place in the Mideast region. The Irish closed the season with an overall record of 21–8 and was ranked in the top ten of both major polls.

== Roster ==
1969–70 Notre Dame Fighting Irish men's basketball team
Players
Coaches

Pos.	#	Name	Height	Weight	Year	Hometown
G	34	Austin Carr	6 ft 4 in (1.93 m)	200 lb (91 kg)	Jr	Washington, D.C.
F	43	Sid Catlett	6 ft 8 in (2.03 m)	230 lb (104 kg)	Jr	Washington, D.C.
F	45	John Gallagher	6 ft 5 in (1.96 m)	196 lb (89 kg)	Sr	Lynbrook, New York
F	44	Doug Gemmell	6 ft 3 in (1.91 m)	185 lb (84 kg)	So	Irvington, New Jersey
F	41	Jim Hinga	6 ft 4 in (1.93 m)	200 lb (91 kg)	Jr	Muncie, Indiana
F	42	Collis Jones	6 ft 7 in (2.01 m)	200 lb (91 kg)	Jr	Washington, D.C.
G	35	Jack Meehan	6 ft 1 in (1.85 m)	181 lb (82 kg)	Jr	Philadelphia, Pennsylvania
G	30	Michael O'Connell	6 ft 1 in (1.85 m)	180 lb (82 kg)	Sr	Cincinnati, Ohio
C	52	John Pleick	6 ft 8 in (2.03 m)	236 lb (107 kg)	Jr	El Segundo, California
F	53	Jim Regelean	6 ft 8 in (2.03 m)	195 lb (88 kg)	So	Lincoln, Nebraska
G	32	Thomas Sinnott	6 ft 4 in (1.93 m)	201 lb (91 kg)	Jr	Elizabeth, New Jersey
C	55	Jay Ziznewski	6 ft 6 in (1.98 m)	250 lb (113 kg)	Sr	Perth Amboy, New Jersey

Head coach

- John Dee

Assistant coach(es)

Legend

- (C) Team captain
- (S) Suspended
- (I) Ineligible
- (W) Walk-on
- Injured
- Current redshirt

== Schedule ==
Date time, TV	Rank^{#}	Opponent^{#}	Result	Record	Site city, state
Regular Season
Dec 1, 1969*	No. 13	at Minnesota	W 84–75	1–0	Williams Arena; Minneapolis, Minnesota
Dec 3, 1969*	No. 13	Michigan	W 87–86	2–0	Joyce Center; South Bend, Indiana
Dec 6, 1969*	No. 13	at Valparaiso	W 98–82	3–0	Hilltop Gym; Valparaiso, Indiana
Dec 10, 1969*	No. 10	Northern Illinois	W 111–92	4–0	Joyce Center; South Bend, Indiana
Dec 13, 1969*	No. 10	Saint Louis	W 65–53	5–0	Joyce Center; South Bend, Indiana
Dec 15, 1969*	No. 6	Kansas	L 63–75	5–1	Joyce Center; South Bend, Indiana
Dec 20, 1969*	No. 6	at Indiana	W 89–88	6–1	New Fieldhouse; Bloomington, Indiana
Dec 27, 1969*	No. 11	vs. No. 1 Kentucky	L 100–102	6–2	Freedom Hall; Louisville, Kentucky
Dec 29, 1969*	No. 13	vs. West Virginia	W 84–80	7–2	Municipal Auditorium; New Orleans, Louisiana
Dec 30, 1969*	No. 13	vs. No. 3 South Carolina	L 83–84	7–3	Municipal Auditorium; New Orleans, Louisiana
Jan 3, 1970*	No. 13	at No. 2 UCLA	L 77–108	7–4	Pauley Pavilion; Los Angeles, California
Jan 7, 1970*		Fordham	W 91–76	8–4	Joyce Center; South Bend, Indiana
Jan 10, 1970*		Villanova	W 94–92	9–4	Joyce Center; South Bend, Indiana
Jan 14, 1970*		DePaul	W 96–73	10–4	Joyce Center; South Bend, Indiana
Jan 17, 1970*		vs. Duquesne	W 82–66	11–4	Chicago Stadium; Chicago, Illinois
Jan 20, 1970*	No. 20	at Michigan State	L 82–85	11–5	Jenison Field House; East Lansing, Michigan
Jan 31, 1970*		vs. No. 10 Illinois	W 86–83	12–5	Chicago Stadium; Chicago, Illinois
Feb 4, 1970*		Saint Peter's	W 135–88	13–5	Joyce Center; South Bend, Indiana
Feb 7, 1970*		No. 9 Marquette	W 96–95	14–5	Joyce Center; South Bend, Indiana
Feb 10, 1970*	No. 16	St. John's	W 90–76	14–5	Joyce Center; South Bend, Indiana
Feb 14, 1970*	No. 16	at Detroit Mercy	W 95–93	16–5	Calihan Hall; Detroit, Michigan
Feb 16, 1970*	No. 14	Tulane	W 115–80	17–5	Joyce Center; South Bend, Indiana
Feb 19, 1970*	No. 14	at NYU	W 77–65	18–5	Madison Square Garden; New York, New York
Feb 21, 1970*	No. 14	West Virginia	W 114–78	19–5	Joyce Center; South Bend, Indiana
Feb 23, 1970*	No. 14	at Butler	W 121–114	20–5	Hinkle Fieldhouse; Indianapolis, Indiana
Feb 28, 1970*	No. 13	at Dayton	L 79–95	20–6	UD Arena; Dayton, Ohio
NCAA Tournament
Mar 7, 1970*	No. 15	vs. No. 17 Ohio; First round	W 112–82	21–6	UD Arena; Dayton, Ohio
Mar 12, 1970*	No. 9	vs. No. 1 Kentucky; Regional semifinal – Sweet Sixteen	L 99–109	21–7	St. John Arena; Columbus, Ohio
Mar 14, 1970*	No. 9	vs. No. 7 Iowa; Regional 3rd Place game	L 106–121	21–8	St. John Arena (13,865); Columbus, Ohio
*Non-conference game. ^{#}Rankings from AP Poll. (#) Tournament seedings in parentheses. ME=Mideast.

== Rankings ==
Ranking movements Legend: ██ Increase in ranking ██ Decrease in ranking — = Not ranked т = Tied with team above or below
	Week														
Poll	Pre	1	2	3	4	5	6	7	8	9	10	11	12	13	Final
AP	13	10	6	11	13	—	—	20	—	—	16	14	13	15	9
Coaches	—	16	7	13	12	—	—	—	—	—	15-т	16-т	15	18	8
