= 1969–70 Western Kentucky Hilltoppers basketball team =

American college basketball season

1969–70 Western Kentucky Hilltoppers basketball

Ohio Valley Conference Champion

NCAA Tournament, First Round
- Conference: Ohio Valley Conference

Ranking
- Coaches: No. 17
- AP: No. 18
- Record: 22–3 (14–0 OVC)
- Head coach: John Oldham
- Assistant coach: Jim Richards
- Home arena: E. A. Diddle Arena

1969–70 Ohio Valley Conference men's basketball standings
	Conf.				Overall
Team	W		L	PCT	W		L	PCT
No. 18 Western Kentucky	14	–	0	1.000	22	–	3	.880
Murray State	9	–	5	.643	17	–	9	.654
East Tennessee State	8	–	6	.571	15	–	11	.577
Eastern Kentucky	8	–	6	.571	12	–	10	.545
Middle Tennessee	6	–	8	.429	15	–	11	.577
Morehead State	5	–	9	.357	13	–	11	.542
Tennessee Tech	4	–	10	.286	10	–	15	.400
Austin Peay	2	–	12	.143	5	–	21	.192
Rankings from AP Poll

The 1969–70 Western Kentucky Hilltoppers men's basketball team represented Western Kentucky University during the 1969-70 NCAA basketball season. The Hilltoppers were led by Ohio Valley Conference Coach of the Year John Oldham and OVC Player of the Year Jim McDaniels. WKU won the OVC season championship, going undefeated in conference play, and the automatic bid to the 1970 NCAA University Division basketball tournament. No conference tournament was held, so the bid was awarded to the season champion. Jerome Perry and Jim Rose joined McDaniels on the All-OVC Team.

== Schedule ==
Date time, TV	Rank^{#}	Opponent^{#}	Result	Record	Site city, state
Regular Season
12/1/1969*		Eastern Michigan	W 95–70	1–0	E. A. Diddle Arena; Bowling Green, KY
12/4/1969*		VCU	W 115–73	2–0	E. A. Diddle Arena; Bowling Green, KY
12/8/1969*		UC Riverside	W 92–79	3–0	E. A. Diddle Arena; Bowling Green, KY
12/11/1969*		Butler	W 92–61	4–0	E. A. Diddle Arena; Bowling Green, KY
12/13/1969*		at Saint Francis (PA)	W 97–67	5–0	Doyle Hall; Loretto, PA
12/15/1969*		No. 7 Duquesne	L 65–87	5–1	Mellon Arena; Pittsburgh, PA
12/19/1969*		vs. UTEP; Jayhawk Classic	W 78–59	6–1	Allen Fieldhouse; Lawrence, KS
12/20/1969*		at Kansas; Jayhawk Classic	L 81–104	6–2	Allen Fieldhouse; Lawrence, KS
1/3/1970		Tennessee Tech	W 99–70	7–2 (1-0)	E. A. Diddle Arena; Bowling Green, KY
1/5/1970		East Tennessee	W 95–91 ^{OT}	8–2 (2-0)	E. A. Diddle Arena; Bowling Green, KY
1/10/1970		at Eastern Kentucky	W 86–83	9–2 (3-0)	Alumni Coliseum; Richmond, KY
1/12/1970		at Morehead State	W 86–83	10–2 (4-0)	Wetherby Gymnasium; Morehead, KY
1/17/1970*		La Salle	W 102–80	11–2	E. A. Diddle Arena; Bowling Green, KY
1/19/1970		Murray State	W 85–75	12–2 (5-0)	E. A. Diddle Arena; Bowling Green, KY
1/26/1970		at Austin Peay	W 106–79	13–2 (6-0)	Memorial Health Gymnasium; Clarksville, TN
1/31/1970		at Middle Tennessee	W 83–74	14–2 (7-0)	Alumni Memorial Gym; Murfreesboro, TN
2/7/1970		Middle Tennessee	W 72–60	15–2 (8-0)	E. A. Diddle Arena; Bowling Green, KY
2/9/1970		Eastern Kentucky	W 88–77	16–2 (9-0)	E. A. Diddle Arena; Bowling Green, KY
2/14/1970	No. 17	at East Tennessee	W 92–83	17–2 (10-0)	Brooks Gym; Johnson City, TN
2/16/1970	No. 17	at Tennessee Tech	W 100–64	18–2 (11-0)	Memorial Gymnasium; Cookeville, TN
2/21/1970	No. 16	Morehead State	W 98–74	19–2 (12-0)	E. A. Diddle Arena; Bowling Green, KY
2/23/1970*	No. 16	Dayton	W 76–63	20–2	E. A. Diddle Arena; Bowling Green, KY
2/28/1970	No. 12	at Murray State	W 77–75	21–2 (13-0)	Racer Arena; Murray, KY
3/2/1970	No. 12	Austin Peay	W 100–84	22–2 (14-0)	E. A. Diddle Arena; Bowling Green, KY
1970 NCAA University Division basketball tournament
3/7/1970*	No. 12	vs. No. 6 Jacksonville; Mideast Region First Round	L 96–109	22–3	UD Arena; Dayton, OH
*Non-conference game. ^{#}Rankings from AP Poll; NCAA Tournament Games Vacated. (#) Tournament seedings in parentheses.
