= 1969–70 New Mexico State Aggies basketball team =

American college basketball season

1969–70 New Mexico State Aggies men's basketball
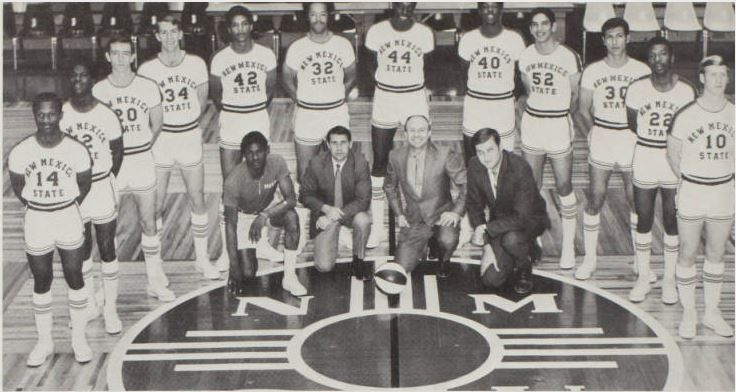

Midwest Regional Champions

NCAA tournament, Final Four
- Conference: Independent

Ranking
- Coaches: No. 4
- AP: No. 5
- Record: 27–3
- Head coach: Lou Henson (4th season)
- Assistant coaches: Ed Murphy; Rob Evans
- Home arena: Pan American Center

1969–70 NCAA University Division men's basketball independents standings
	Conf.				Overall
Team	W		L	PCT	W		L	PCT
No. 4 Jacksonville		–		–	27	–	2	.931
No. 5 New Mexico State		–		–	27	–	3	.900
No. 8 Marquette		–		–	26	–	3	.897
No. 3 St. Bonaventure		–		–	25	–	3	.893
No. 11 Florida State		–		–	23	–	3	.885
No. 12 Houston		–		–	25	–	5	.833
Army		–		–	22	–	6	.786
No. 17 Niagara		–		–	22	–	7	.759
No. 16 Utah State		–		–	22	–	7	.759
Villanova		–		–	22	–	7	.759
No. 9 Notre Dame		–		–	21	–	8	.724
St. John's		–		–	21	–	8	.724
Georgetown		–		–	18	–	7	.720
Duquesne		–		–	17	–	7	.708
Dayton		–		–	19	–	8	.704
Manhattan		–		–	18	–	8	.692
Hardin–Simmons		–		–	17	–	9	.654
Holy Cross		–		–	16	–	9	.640
Long Island		–		–	16	–	9	.640
Georgia Tech		–		–	17	–	10	.630
Creighton		–		–	15	–	10	.600
Seattle		–		–	15	–	10	.600
Boston University		–		–	14	–	10	.583
Butler		–		–	15	–	11	.577
Oklahoma City		–		–	17	–	13	.567
Fairleigh Dickinson		–		–	13	–	10	.565
Southern Illinois		–		–	13	–	10	.565
Colgate		–		–	14	–	11	.560
Providence		–		–	14	–	11	.560
Denver		–		–	13	–	11	.542
Loyola (IL)		–		–	13	–	11	.542
Penn State		–		–	13	–	11	.542
Rutgers		–		–	13	–	11	.542
Saint Peter's		–		–	13	–	11	.542
Northern Illinois		–		–	13	–	12	.520
Air Force		–		–	12	–	12	.500
Fairfield		–		–	12	–	12	.500
Iona		–		–	12	–	12	.500
NYU		–		–	12	–	12	.500
Pittsburgh		–		–	12	–	12	.500
Saint Francis (PA)		–		–	12	–	12	.500
Syracuse		–		–	12	–	12	.500
DePaul		–		–	12	–	13	.480
West Texas State		–		–	12	–	13	.480
Loyola (LA)		–		–	12	–	14	.462
Boston College		–		–	11	–	13	.458
Virginia Tech		–		–	10	–	12	.455
St. Francis (NY)		–		–	9	–	12	.429
West Virginia		–		–	11	–	15	.423
Canisius		–		–	9	–	13	.409
Fordham		–		–	10	–	15	.400
Seton Hall		–		–	10	–	15	.400
Marshall		–		–	9	–	14	.391
Miami (FL)		–		–	9	–	17	.346
Centenary		–		–	8	–	16	.333
Pan American		–		–	8	–	16	.333
Detroit		–		–	7	–	18	.280
Tulane		–		–	5	–	18	.217
Xavier		–		–	5	–	20	.200
Navy		–		–	4	–	19	.174
Portland		–		–	4	–	22	.154
Rankings from AP Poll

The 1969–70 New Mexico State Aggies men's basketball team represented New Mexico State University during the 1969–70 NCAA University Division men's basketball season. The Aggies were independent and not a member of a conference. They were led by fourth year head coach Lou Henson and three future NBA players – consensus second-team All-American Jimmy Collins, big man Sam Lacey, and Charlie Criss. The team reached the Final Four of the NCAA tournament, losing to eventual champion UCLA before defeating St. Bonaventure in the national third-place game. To date, it is the only Final Four appearance in program history. The Aggies had three win streaks of at least eight games during the season and finished with a 27–3 record.

== Roster ==
1969–70 New Mexico State Aggies men's basketball team
Players
Coaches

Pos.	#	Name	Height	Weight	Year	Hometown
G	14	Charlie Criss	5 ft 8 in (1.73 m)	160 lb (73 kg)	Sr	Yonkers, New York
G	22	Jimmy Collins	6 ft 2 in (1.88 m)	200 lb (91 kg)	Sr	Syracuse, New York
C	44	Sam Lacey	6 ft 10 in (2.08 m)	235 lb (107 kg)	Sr	Indianola, Mississippi

Head coach

- Lou Henson (New Mexico State)

Assistant coach(es)

- Ed Murphy (Hardin–Simmons)
- Rob Evans (New Mexico State)

Legend

- (C) Team captain
- (S) Suspended
- (I) Ineligible
- (W) Walk-on
- Injured
- Current redshirt

== Schedule/results ==
Date time, TV	Rank^{#}	Opponent^{#}	Result	Record	High points	High rebounds	High assists	Site (attendance) city, state
Regular Season
Dec 1, 1969*	No. 6	Oklahoma Christian	W 93–58	1–0	–	–	–	Pan American Center; Las Cruces, NM
Dec 4, 1969*	No. 6	Wichita State	W 108–76	2–0	–	–	–	Pan American Center; Las Cruces, NM
Dec 6, 1969*	No. 6	Baylor	W 102–83	3–0	–	–	–	Pan American Center; Las Cruces, NM
Dec 8, 1969*	No. 6	at New Mexico	W 90–83	4–0	–	–	–	The Pit/Bob King Court; Albuquerque, NM
Dec 11, 1969*	No. 3	at Brigham Young	W 80–78 ^{OT}	5–0	–	–	–	George Albert Smith Fieldhouse; Provo, UT
Dec 13, 1969*	No. 3	at Arizona State	W 94–88	6–0	–	–	–	Sun Devil Gym; Tempe, AZ
Dec 16, 1969*	No. 3	New Mexico	W 91–73	7–0	–	–	–	Pan American Center; Las Cruces, NM
Dec 19, 1969*	No. 3	at Hardin–Simmons; Cowboy Classic	W 110–80	8–0	–	27 – Lacey	–	Rose Fieldhouse; Abilene, TX
Dec 20, 1969*	No. 3	vs. Baylor; Cowboy Classic	L 73–87	8–1	–	–	–	Rose Fieldhouse; Abilene, TX
Dec 26, 1969*	No. 7	Idaho State; Roadrunner Invitational	W 88–80	9–1	–	–	–	Pan American Center; Las Cruces, NM
Dec 27, 1969*	No. 7	Creighton; Roadrunner Invitational	W 93–78	10–1	–	–	–	Pan American Center; Las Cruces, NM
Dec 30, 1969*	No. 7	Sul Ross State	W 95–75	11–1	–	–	–	Pan American Center; Las Cruces, NM
Jan 2, 1970*	No. 7	Arizona	W 95–76	12–1	–	–	–	Pan American Center; Las Cruces, NM
Jan 5, 1970*	No. 7	at Texas-El Paso	W 75–66	13–1	–	–	–	Memorial Gym; El Paso, TX
Jan 10, 1970*	No. 6	Montana State	W 106–68	14–1	–	–	–	Pan American Center; Las Cruces, NM
Jan 17, 1970*	No. 5	Hardin–Simmons	W 83–75	15–1	–	–	–	Pan American Center; Las Cruces, NM
Jan 24, 1970*	No. 5	Texas-El Paso	W 90–77	16–1	–	–	–	Pan American Center; Las Cruces, NM
Jan 27, 1970*	No. 5	at West Texas A&M	W 88–62	17–1	–	–	–	WT Fieldhouse; Canyon, TX
Jan 29, 1970*	No. 5	at Creighton	L 68–72	17–2	–	–	–	Omaha Civic Auditorium; Omaha, NE
Feb 7, 1970*	No. 5	at Utah State	W 95–90	18–2	–	–	–	Nelson Fieldhouse; Logan, UT
Feb 9, 1970*	No. 5	at Montana State	W 92–73	19–2	–	–	–	Worthington Arena; Bozeman, MT
Feb 14, 1970*	No. 5	Air Force	W 99–81	20–2	42 – Collins	–	–	Pan American Center; Las Cruces, NM
Feb 21, 1970*	No. 5	West Texas A&M	W 87–73	21–2	–	–	–	Pan American Center; Las Cruces, NM
Feb 23, 1970*	No. 5	Boise State	W 105–79	22–2	–	–	–	Pan American Center; Las Cruces, NM
Feb 28, 1970*	No. 5	No. 20 Utah State	W 104–92	23–2	–	–	–	Pan American Center; Las Cruces, NM
NCAA Tournament
Mar 7, 1970*	No. 5	vs. Rice	W 101–77	24–2	–	–	–	Daniel–Meyer Coliseum; Fort Worth, TX
Mar 12, 1970*	No. 5	vs. Kansas State	W 70–66	25–2	23 – Collins	11 – Lacey	–	Allen Fieldhouse; Lawrence, KS
Mar 14, 1970*	No. 5	vs. No. 14 Drake	W 87–78	26–2	26 – Collins	24 – Lacey	–	Allen Fieldhouse; Lawrence, KS
March 19, 1970*	No. 5	vs. No. 2 UCLA; National semifinal	L 77–93	26–3	28 – Collins	16 – Lacey	–	Cole Field House; College Park, MD
Mar 21, 1970*	No. 5	vs. No. 3 St. Bonaventure; Consolation	W 79–73	27–3	18 – Collins, Lacey	19 – Lacey	–	Cole Fieldhouse; College Park, MD
*Non-conference game. ^{#}Rankings from AP Poll. (#) Tournament seedings in parentheses. MW=Midwest. All times are in Mountain Time.

== Rankings ==
Ranking movements Legend: ██ Increase in ranking ██ Decrease in ranking
	Week														
Poll	Pre	1	2	3	4	5	6	7	8	9	10	11	12	13	Final
AP	6	3	3	7	7	6	5	5	5	6	6	5	5	5	5
Coaches	5	3	3	7	8	6	5	5	5	5	5	5	5	5	4

== Awards and honors ==
- Jimmy Collins – Consensus Second-Team All-American

== Team players in the 1970 NBA draft ==
Round	Pick	Player	NBA Club
1	5	Sam Lacey	Cincinnati Royals
1	11	Jimmy Collins	Chicago Bulls
