= 1969–70 Marquette Warriors men's basketball team =

American college basketball season

1969–70 Marquette Warriors men's basketball

NIT Champions
- Conference: Independent

Ranking
- Coaches: No. 10
- AP: No. 8
- Record: 26–3
- Head coach: Al McGuire (6th season)
- Assistant coach: Hank Raymonds (9th season)
- Home arena: Milwaukee Arena

1969–70 NCAA University Division men's basketball independents standings
	Conf.				Overall
Team	W		L	PCT	W		L	PCT
No. 4 Jacksonville		–		–	27	–	2	.931
No. 5 New Mexico State		–		–	27	–	3	.900
No. 8 Marquette		–		–	26	–	3	.897
No. 3 St. Bonaventure		–		–	25	–	3	.893
No. 11 Florida State		–		–	23	–	3	.885
No. 12 Houston		–		–	25	–	5	.833
Army		–		–	22	–	6	.786
No. 17 Niagara		–		–	22	–	7	.759
No. 16 Utah State		–		–	22	–	7	.759
Villanova		–		–	22	–	7	.759
No. 9 Notre Dame		–		–	21	–	8	.724
St. John's		–		–	21	–	8	.724
Georgetown		–		–	18	–	7	.720
Duquesne		–		–	17	–	7	.708
Dayton		–		–	19	–	8	.704
Manhattan		–		–	18	–	8	.692
Hardin–Simmons		–		–	17	–	9	.654
Holy Cross		–		–	16	–	9	.640
Long Island		–		–	16	–	9	.640
Georgia Tech		–		–	17	–	10	.630
Creighton		–		–	15	–	10	.600
Seattle		–		–	15	–	10	.600
Boston University		–		–	14	–	10	.583
Butler		–		–	15	–	11	.577
Oklahoma City		–		–	17	–	13	.567
Fairleigh Dickinson		–		–	13	–	10	.565
Southern Illinois		–		–	13	–	10	.565
Colgate		–		–	14	–	11	.560
Providence		–		–	14	–	11	.560
Denver		–		–	13	–	11	.542
Loyola (IL)		–		–	13	–	11	.542
Penn State		–		–	13	–	11	.542
Rutgers		–		–	13	–	11	.542
Saint Peter's		–		–	13	–	11	.542
Northern Illinois		–		–	13	–	12	.520
Air Force		–		–	12	–	12	.500
Fairfield		–		–	12	–	12	.500
Iona		–		–	12	–	12	.500
NYU		–		–	12	–	12	.500
Pittsburgh		–		–	12	–	12	.500
Saint Francis (PA)		–		–	12	–	12	.500
Syracuse		–		–	12	–	12	.500
DePaul		–		–	12	–	13	.480
West Texas State		–		–	12	–	13	.480
Loyola (LA)		–		–	12	–	14	.462
Boston College		–		–	11	–	13	.458
Virginia Tech		–		–	10	–	12	.455
St. Francis (NY)		–		–	9	–	12	.429
West Virginia		–		–	11	–	15	.423
Canisius		–		–	9	–	13	.409
Fordham		–		–	10	–	15	.400
Seton Hall		–		–	10	–	15	.400
Marshall		–		–	9	–	14	.391
Miami (FL)		–		–	9	–	17	.346
Centenary		–		–	8	–	16	.333
Pan American		–		–	8	–	16	.333
Detroit		–		–	7	–	18	.280
Tulane		–		–	5	–	18	.217
Xavier		–		–	5	–	20	.200
Navy		–		–	4	–	19	.174
Portland		–		–	4	–	22	.154
Rankings from AP Poll

The 1969–70 Marquette Warriors men's basketball team represented Marquette University during the 1969–70 men's college basketball season. The Warriors finished the regular season with a record of 26–3. The season is particularly notable as coach Al McGuire turned down a bid to the 1970 NCAA Tournament after the committee placed the tenth-ranked Warriors in the Midwest region instead of the geographically closer Mideast, the first team to ever take this action. McGuire opted to play in the 1970 National Invitation Tournament instead, where they defeated Massachusetts, Utah and LSU to advance to the NIT championship where they defeated St. John's to become NIT champions. As a direct result of this action, the NCAA forbid its members from declining NCAA tournament bids when offered moving forward.

== Roster ==
1969–70 Marquette Warriors men's basketball team
Players
Coaches

Pos.	#	Name	Height	Weight	Year	Hometown
F	54	Bob Black	6 ft 4 in (1.93 m)	205 lb (93 kg)	Jr	Corning, Georgia
F	31	Gary Brell	6 ft 6 in (1.98 m)	190 lb (86 kg)	Jr	Milwaukee, Wisconsin
G	12	Jack Burke	6 ft 1 in (1.85 m)	180 lb (82 kg)	Sr	Ford, New Jersey
C	51	Ric Cobb	6 ft 5 in (1.96 m)	200 lb (91 kg)	Sr	Brooklyn, New York
G	33	Gary Grzesk	6 ft 0 in (1.83 m)	172 lb (78 kg)	So	Milwaukee, Wisconsin
F	30	Guy Lam	6 ft 8 in (2.03 m)	200 lb (91 kg)	So	Arlington Heights, Illinois
F	42	Hugh McMahon	6 ft 6 in (1.98 m)	205 lb (93 kg)	Jr	Brooklyn, New York
F	53	Terry McQuade	6 ft 5 in (1.96 m)	190 lb (86 kg)	So	Beechurst, New York
G	14	Dean Meminger	6 ft 0 in (1.83 m)	175 lb (79 kg)	Jr	New York
G	25	Bob Piercy	5 ft 10 in (1.78 m)	185 lb (84 kg)	So	Milwaukee, Wisconsin
G	45	Ron Rahn	6 ft 5 in (1.96 m)	200 lb (91 kg)	Sr	Milwaukee, Wisconsin
G	15	Jeff Sewell	6 ft 3 in (1.91 m)	175 lb (79 kg)	Sr	Grafton, Wisconsin
F	21	Tom Sonnenberg	6 ft 4 in (1.93 m)	180 lb (82 kg)	Jr	Milwaukee, Wisconsin
F	50	Joe Thomas	6 ft 6 in (1.98 m)	205 lb (93 kg)	Sr	Canton, Georgia

Head coach

- Al McGuire

Assistant coach(es)

- Hank Raymonds

Legend

- (C) Team captain
- (S) Suspended
- (I) Ineligible
- (W) Walk-on
- Injured
- Current redshirt

== Schedule ==
Date time, TV	Rank^{#}	Opponent^{#}	Result	Record	Site city, state
Regular Season
December 2		Northern Michigan	W 98–60	1–0	Milwaukee Arena; Milwaukee, WI
December 6		UW Milwaukee	W 86–58	2–0	Milwaukee Arena; Milwaukee, WI
December 8		at Michigan	L 78–86	2–1	Crisler Arena; Ann Arbor, Michigan
December 11		Drake	W 72–70	3–1	Milwaukee Arena; Milwaukee, WI
December 13		North Texas	W 83–60	4–1	Milwaukee Arena; Milwaukee, WI
December 20		Bowling Green	W 64–55	5–1	Milwaukee Arena; Milwaukee, WI
December 22		Minnesota	W 67–51	6–1	Milwaukee Arena; Milwaukee, WI
December 26		Delaware	W 99–71	7–1	Milwaukee Arena; Milwaukee, WI
December 27		vs. Wisconsin; Milwaukee Classic	W 64–43	8–1	Milwaukee Arena; Milwaukee, WI
January 3		Detroit	W 81–61	9–1	Milwaukee Arena; Milwaukee, WI
January 6		Loyola (IL)	W 85–72	10–1	Milwaukee Arena; Milwaukee, WI
January 10		at DePaul	W 72–60	11–1	Alumni Hall; Chicago, Illinois
January 17		Southern Illinois	W 67–57	12–1	Milwaukee Arena; Milwaukee, WI
January 24		Xavier	W 82–73	13–1	Milwaukee Arena; Milwaukee, WI
January 27	No. 7	Wisconsin	W 60–51	14–1	Marquette Gymnasium; Milwaukee, WI
January 31		at Loyola (IL)	L 72–76	14–2	Alumni Gym
February 7		at Notre Dame	L 95–96	14–3	Joyce Center; South Bend, Indiana
February 9		Air Force	W 79–74	15–3	Milwaukee Arena; Milwaukee, WI
February 12		at St. Louis	W 66–54	16–3	The Arena
February 14		DePaul	W 79–60	17–3	Milwaukee Arena; Milwaukee, WI
February 21		at Detroit	W 80–60	18–3	Calihan Hall
February 23		at Xavier	W 81–73	19–3	Cincinnati Gardens; Cincinnati, Ohio
February 28		Creighton	W 76–66	20–3	Milwaukee Arena; Milwaukee, WI
March 3		at Southern Illinois	W 75–68	21–3	The SIU Arena; Carbondale, Illinois
March 5		at Tulane	W 79–76	22–3	Tulane Gym; New Orleans, Louisiana
National Invitation Tournament
March 14		vs. Massachusetts; NIT First Round	W 62–55	23–3	Madison Square Garden; New York
March 17		vs. Utah; NIT Quarterfinals	W 83–63	24–3	Madison Square Garden; New York
March 19	No. 8	vs. LSU; NIT Semifinals	W 101–79	25–3	Madison Square Garden; New York
March 21	No. 8	vs. St. John's (NY); NIT Finals	W 65–53	26–3	Madison Square Garden; New York
*Non-conference game. ^{#}Rankings from AP Poll. (#) Tournament seedings in parentheses.
