= 1970 National Invitation Tournament =

Annual NCAA basketball competition

- Season: 1969–70
- Teams: 16
- Finals site: Madison Square Garden, New York City
- Champions: Marquette Warriors (1st title)
- Runner-up: St. John's Redmen (7th title game)
- Semifinalists: Army Cadets (5th semifinal); LSU Tigers (1st semifinal)
- Winning coach: Al McGuire (1st title)
- MVP: Dean Meminger (Marquette)

The 1970 National Invitation Tournament was the 1970 edition of the annual NCAA college basketball competition. It was unique in that coach Al McGuire of 8th ranked Marquette University, unhappy with his team's NCAA tournament placement in the Midwest rather than the closer Mideast regional, turned down that bid and elected to play in the NIT instead. His Marquette Warriors went on to claim the championship, and as a result the NCAA now forbids its members from playing in other postseason tournaments if offered an NCAA bid.

This tournament represented the final college games for LSU great Pete Maravich, the Men's NCAA all-time leading scorer. Maravich finished his three-year career with 3,667 points, 44.2 per game, records which stand through the 2024-25 season, despite the reinstitution of freshman eligibility (1972–73) and the introduction of the shot clock (1985–86) and 3-point shot (1986–87). It was LSU's only postseason appearance between 1954 and 1979. The Tigers were coached by Pete's father, Press Maravich.

== Selected teams ==
Sixteen teams were selected for the 1970 NIT.

Team	Conference	Overall record	Appearance	Last bid
Army	Independent	19–5	7th	1969
Cincinnati	Missouri Valley	21–5	4th	1957
Duke	ACC	17–8	3rd	1968
Duquesne	Independent	17–6	13th	1968
Georgetown	Independent	18–6	2nd	1953
Georgia Tech	Independent	16–9	1st	Never
Louisville	Missouri Valley	18–8	8th	1969
LSU	SEC	20–8	1st	Never
Manhattan	Independent	17–7	10th	1966
Marquette	Independent	22–3	4th	1967
Miami (OH)	MAC	16–7	1st	Never
North Carolina	ACC	18–8	1st	Never
Oklahoma	Big Eight	18–8	1st	Never
St. John's	Independent	18–7	19th	1966
UMass	Yankee	18–6	1st	Never
Utah	WAC	17–9	6th	1957

== Bracket ==
First Round
Manhattan	95
North Carolina	90
Army	72
Cincinnati	67
Georgia Tech	78
Duquesne	68
St. John's	70
Miami (OH)	57
Marquette	62
UMass	55
Utah	78
Duke	75
Oklahoma	74
Louisville	73
LSU	83
Georgetown	82

Quarterfinals
Manhattan	72
Army	77
Georgia Tech	55
St. John's	56
Marquette	83
Utah	63
Oklahoma	94
LSU	97

Semifinals
Army	59
St. John's	60
Marquette	101
LSU	79

Finals
St. John's	53
Marquette	65

Third place game
Army	75
LSU	68

== See also ==
- 1970 NCAA University Division basketball tournament
- 1970 NCAA College Division basketball tournament
- 1970 NAIA Division I men's basketball tournament
- 1970 National Women's Invitational Tournament
