= 1969–70 NCAA University Division men's basketball rankings =

- Season: 1969–70
- NCAA Tournament: 1970
- Preseason No. 1: South Carolina
- NCAA Tournament Champions: UCLA
NCAA University Division men's basketball rankings


The 1969–70 NCAA University Division men's basketball rankings was made up of two human polls, the AP Poll and the Coaches Poll, in addition to various other preseason polls.

== Legend ==
	Increase in ranking
	Decrease in ranking
	New to rankings from previous week
Italics	Number of first place votes
(#–#)	Win–loss record
т	Tied with team above or below also with this symbol

== AP Poll ==
	Preseason	Week 1 Dec. 8	Week 2 Dec. 15	Week 3 Dec. 22	Week 4 Dec. 29	Week 5 Jan. 5	Week 6 Jan. 12	Week 7 Jan. 19	Week 8 Jan. 26	Week 9 Feb. 2	Week 10 Feb. 9	Week 11 Feb. 16	Week 12 Feb. 23	Week 13 Mar. 2	Final Mar. 9	
1.	South Carolina	Kentucky (2–0)	Kentucky (4–0)	Kentucky (6–0)	Kentucky (7–0)	UCLA (8–0)	UCLA (10–0)	UCLA (12–0)	UCLA (14–0)	UCLA (16–0)	UCLA (17–0)	UCLA (20–0)	Kentucky (21–1)	UCLA (23–1)	Kentucky (25–1)	1.
2.	Kentucky	UCLA (2–0)	UCLA (4–0)	UCLA (4–0)	UCLA (6–0)	Kentucky (9–0)	Kentucky (11–0)	Kentucky (13–0)	Kentucky (14–0)	South Carolina (15–1)	South Carolina (17–1)	Kentucky (19–1)	UCLA (21–1)	Kentucky (23–1)	UCLA (24–2)	2.
3.	Purdue	New Mexico State (3–0)	New Mexico State (6–0)	South Carolina (6–1)	South Carolina (6–1)	South Carolina (8–1)	South Carolina (10–1)	South Carolina (12–1)	St. Bonaventure (12–0)	Kentucky (15–1)	Kentucky (17–1)	St. Bonaventure (17–1)	St. Bonaventure (19–1)	South Carolina (23–2)	St. Bonaventure (23–1)	3.
4.	UCLA	Davidson (2–0)	Davidson (2–0)	North Carolina (5–1)	North Carolina (6–1)	North Carolina (9–1)	St. Bonaventure (10–0)	St. Bonaventure (10–0)	South Carolina (12–1)	St. Bonaventure (13–1)	St. Bonaventure (15–1)	South Carolina (19–2)	South Carolina (21–2)	St. Bonaventure (20–1)	Jacksonville (24–1)	4.
5.	Davidson	North Carolina (2–0)	South Carolina (4–1)	Ohio (6–0)	Ohio (7–0)	St. Bonaventure (8–0)	New Mexico State (14–1)	New Mexico State (15–1)	New Mexico State (16–1)	NC State (15–1)	NC State (17–1)	New Mexico State (20–2)	New Mexico State (21–2)	New Mexico State (23–2)	New Mexico State (24–2)	5.
6.	New Mexico State	USC (2–0)	Notre Dame (5–0)	Tennessee (4–0)	Tennessee (5–0)	New Mexico State (12–1)	Jacksonville (12–0)	Jacksonville (13–0)	Jacksonville (13–0)	New Mexico State (17–2)	New Mexico State (18–2)	Jacksonville (19–1)	Jacksonville (21–1)	Jacksonville (22–1)	South Carolina (25–3)	6.
7.	North Carolina	Duquesne (3–0)	North Carolina (3–1)	New Mexico State (8–1)	New Mexico State (10–1)	Jacksonville (9–0)	North Carolina (11–2)	Houston (12–1)	Marquette (13–1)	North Carolina (13–3)	Jacksonville (17–1)	Penn (21–1)	Penn (23–1)	Penn (25–1)	Iowa (19–4)	7.
8.	Marquette	South Carolina (1–1)	Tennessee (2–0)	Houston (8–0)	Houston (9–0)	Davidson (7–1)	Davidson (10–1)	Marquette (12–1)	NC State (13–1)	Jacksonville (14–1)	Penn (19–1)	Florida State (20–2)	Marquette (18–3)	Iowa (17–4)	Marquette (22–3)	8.
9.	Villanova	Tennessee (1–0)	Villanova (3–0)	Davidson (3–1)	Washington (7–0)	Ohio (9–1)	Houston (12–1)	North Carolina (12–3)	North Carolina (12–3)	Marquette (14–2)	Florida State (18–2)	Davidson (18–3)	Iowa (15–4)	Marquette (20–3)	Notre Dame (21–6)	9.
10.	Colorado	Notre Dame (3–0)	Ohio (3–0)	Washington (6–0)	Jacksonville (8–0)	NC State (10–0)	Marquette (11–1)	NC State (12–1)	Illinois (12–2)	Penn (16–1)	North Carolina (14–4)	Marquette (17–3)	Florida State (21–3)	Davidson (22–4)	NC State (22–6)	10.
11.	Duquesne	Louisville (1–0)	Santa Clara (4–0)	Notre Dame (6–1)	Davidson (4–1)	Houston (11–1)	NC State (11–1)	Davidson (11–2)	Davidson (13–2)	USC (13–3)	Drake (16–4)	Iowa (13–4)	Davidson (19–4)	Florida State (23–3)	Florida State (23–3)	11.
12.	Santa Clara	Marquette (2–0)	Purdue (3–1)	USC (4–2)	St. Bonaventure (5–0)	Tennessee (7–1)	Niagara (11–0)	Illinois (12–2)	Houston (12–2)	Florida State (16–2)	Marquette (14–3)	NC State (18–3)	Western Kentucky (19–2)	Western Kentucky (21–2)	Houston (25–3)	12.
13.	Notre Dame	Villanova (2–0)	USC (3–1)	Jacksonville (5–0)	Notre Dame (6–2)	Marquette (9–1)	Columbia (13–1)	Ohio (11–2)	Ohio (12–2)	Drake (15–4)	Davidson (16–3)	North Carolina (16–5)	Notre Dame (19–5)	Houston (22–3)	Penn (25–2)	13.
14.	St. John's	Purdue (2–0)	Louisville (2–1)	Louisville (3–1)	Penn (7–0)	Washington (9–2)	Ohio (9–2)	Penn (12–1)	Penn (14–1)	Illinois (12–3)	Iowa (11–4)	Notre Dame (16–5)	NC State (19–4)	Drake (20–6)	Drake (21–6)	14.
15.	Louisville	Santa Clara (2–0)	LSU (4–0)	Illinois (6–0)	Columbia (8–0)	Niagara (10–0)	Washington (10–2) т	USC (10–3)	USC (11–3)	Davidson (14–3)	Houston (16–3)	Houston (18–3)	Houston (20–3)	Notre Dame (20–6)	Davidson (22–5)	15.
16.	USC	Ohio State (2–0)	Colorado (5–1)	Kansas (6–1)	NC State (9–0)	Oklahoma (10–1)	Penn (11–1) т	Duke (9–2)	Drake (13–4)	Houston (14–3)	Notre Dame (14–5)	Western Kentucky (17–2)	Drake (19–5)	Kansas State (19–6)	Utah State (21–6)	16.
17.	St. Bonaventure	Colorado (3–1)	Marquette (4–1)	Penn (6–0)	Purdue (6–2)	Columbia (11–1)	Illinois (10–2)	Kansas State (12–3)	Columbia (13–2)	Columbia (14–2)	Western Kentucky (15–2)	Drake (17–5)	Kansas State (18–5)	Ohio (20–4)	Niagara (22–5)	17.
18.	Ohio State	Jacksonville (2–0)	Jacksonville (4–0)	Purdue (5–2)	Marquette (8–1)	Penn (8–1)	Louisville (7–2)	Iowa (8–3) т	Florida State (14–2)	Kansas State (14–3)	USC (13–4)	Kansas State (16–5)	Columbia (20–3)	Utah State (19–6)	Western Kentucky (22–3)	18.
19.	Drake	Ohio (2–0)	Houston (5–0)	St. Bonaventure (4–0)	USC (5–3)	Duke (8–1)	Duke (9–2)	Louisville (7–4) т	Kansas State (12–3)	Villanova (12–5)	Columbia (16–3)	Louisville (15–4)	North Carolina (17–6)	NC State (19–6) т	Long Beach State (24–3)	19.
20.	Houston	St. Bonaventure (1–0)	Washington (4–0)	Villanova (3–1)	Colorado (6–3)	Louisville (5–2)	USC (10–3)	Notre Dame (11–4)	Iowa (8–4)	Iowa (9–4)	Georgia (11–6)	Santa Clara (17–3)	Utah State (17–5)	Cincinnati (20–4) т	USC (18–8)	20.
	Preseason	Week 1 Dec. 8	Week 2 Dec. 15	Week 3 Dec. 22	Week 4 Dec. 29	Week 5 Jan. 5	Week 6 Jan. 12	Week 7 Jan. 19	Week 8 Jan. 26	Week 9 Feb. 2	Week 10 Feb. 9	Week 11 Feb. 16	Week 12 Feb. 23	Week 13 Mar. 2	Final Mar. 9	
		Dropped: St. John's; Drake; Houston	Dropped: Duquesne; Ohio State; St. Bonaventure (2–0)	Dropped: Santa Clara; LSU; Colorado (5–3); Marquette (5–1)	Dropped: Louisville; Illinois (6–1); Kansas (6–2); Villanova	Dropped: Notre Dame; Purdue; USC; Colorado	Dropped: Tennessee; Oklahoma	Dropped: Niagara; Columbia (13–2); Washington	Dropped: Duke; Louisville; Notre Dame	Dropped: Ohio	Dropped: Illinois (12–5); Kansas State; Villanova	Dropped: USC; Columbia (18–3); Georgia	Dropped: Louisville; Santa Clara	Dropped: Columbia; North Carolina (18–7)	Dropped: Kansas State; Ohio; Cincinnati (21–5)	

== Coaches Poll ==
	Preseason	Week 1 Dec. 9	Week 2 Dec. 16	Week 3 Dec. 23	Week 4 Dec. 30	Week 5 Jan. 6	Week 6 Jan. 13	Week 7 Jan. 20	Week 8 Jan. 27	Week 9 Feb. 3	Week 10 Feb. 10	Week 11 Feb. 17	Week 12 Feb. 24	Week 13 Mar. 3	Final Mar. 10	
1.	UCLA	Kentucky (2–0)	Kentucky (4–0)	Kentucky (6–0)	Kentucky (7–0)	UCLA (8–0)	UCLA (10–0)	UCLA (12–0)	UCLA (14–0)	UCLA (16–0)	UCLA (17–0)	UCLA (20–0)	UCLA (21–1)	UCLA (23–1)	Kentucky (25–1)	1.
2.	South Carolina	UCLA (2–0)	UCLA (4–0)	UCLA (4–0)	UCLA (6–0)	Kentucky (9–0)	Kentucky (11–0)	Kentucky (13–0)	Kentucky (14–0)	South Carolina (15–1)	South Carolina (17–1)	Kentucky (19–1)	Kentucky (21–1)	Kentucky (23–1)	UCLA (24–2)	2.
3.	Kentucky	New Mexico State (3–0)	New Mexico State (6–0)	South Carolina (6–1)	South Carolina (6–1)	South Carolina (8–1)	South Carolina (10–1)	South Carolina (12–1)	St. Bonaventure (12–0)	Kentucky (15–1)	Kentucky (17–1)	South Carolina (19–2)	South Carolina (21–2)	South Carolina (23–2)	St. Bonaventure (23–1)	3.
4.	Purdue	South Carolina (1–1)	South Carolina (4–1) т	North Carolina (5–1)	North Carolina (6–1)	St. Bonaventure (8–0)	St. Bonaventure (10–0)	St. Bonaventure (10–0)	South Carolina (12–1)	St. Bonaventure (13–1)	St. Bonaventure (15–1)	St. Bonaventure (17–1)	St. Bonaventure (19–1)	St. Bonaventure (20–1)	New Mexico State (24–2)	4.
5.	New Mexico State	USC (2–0) т	USC (3–1) т	Houston (8–0)	Ohio (7–0)	North Carolina (9–1)	New Mexico State (14–1)	New Mexico State (15–1)	New Mexico State (16–1)	New Mexico State (17–2)	New Mexico State (18–2)	New Mexico State (20–2)	New Mexico State (21–2)	New Mexico State (23–2)	Jacksonville (24–1)	5.
6.	Colorado	Duquesne (3–0) т	Davidson (2–0)	Tennessee (4–0)	Washington (7–0)	New Mexico State (12–1)	North Carolina (11–2)	Jacksonville (13–0)	Jacksonville (13–0)	North Carolina (13–3)	NC State (17–1)	Jacksonville (19–1)	Jacksonville (21–1)	Jacksonville (22–1)	South Carolina (25–3)	6.
7.	North Carolina	Davidson (2–0)	Notre Dame (5–0)	New Mexico State (8–1)	St. Bonaventure (5–0)	Jacksonville (9–0)	Jacksonville (12–0)	Houston (12–1)	Marquette (13–1)	NC State (15–1)	Jacksonville (17–1)	Penn (21–1)	Penn (23–1)	Iowa (17–4)	Iowa (19–4)	7.
8.	Davidson	North Carolina (2–0)	Santa Clara (4–0)	Ohio (6–0)	New Mexico State (10–1)	Houston (11–1)	Houston (12–1)	Marquette (12–1)	North Carolina (12–3)	Jacksonville (14–1)	North Carolina (14–4)	NC State (18–3)	Iowa (15–4)	Penn (25–1)	Notre Dame (21–6)	8.
9.	USC	Tennessee (1–0)	North Carolina (3–1)	Kansas (6–1)	Houston (9–0)	Ohio (9–1)	Davidson (10–1)	Illinois (12–2)	Illinois (12–2)	Illinois (12–3)	Penn (19–1)Florida State (18–2)	Iowa (13–4)	Florida State (21–3)	Drake (20–6)	Drake (21–6)	9.
10.	Duquesne	Villanova (2–0)	Villanova (3–0)	St. Bonaventure (4–0)	Jacksonville (8–0)	Tennessee (7–1)	Marquette (11–1)	North Carolina (12–3)	Houston (12–2)	Marquette (14–2)	Drake (16–4)	Davidson (18–3)	Marquette (18–3)	Marquette (20–3)	Marquette (22–3)	10.
11.	Santa Clara	Ohio State (2–0)	Tennessee (2–0)	Washington (6–0)	Tennessee (5–0)	Washington (9–2)	Ohio (9–2)	Davidson (11–2)	Davidson (13–2)	Drake (15–4)	Davidson (16–3) т	Florida State (20–2)	NC State (19–4) т	Houston (22–3)	Houston (25–3)	11.
12.	Kansas	Louisville (1–0)	Ohio (3–0)	Illinois (6–0)	Notre Dame (6–2)	NC State (10–0)	Illinois (10–2)	Ohio (11–2)	NC State (13–1)	Utah (14–4)	Iowa (11–4) т	Drake (17–5)	Houston (20–3) т	Florida State (23–3)	NC State (22–6)	12.
13.	Marquette	Santa Clara (2–0)	Colorado (5–1)	Notre Dame (6–1)	Penn (7–0)	Marquette (9–1)	Washington (10–2)	UTEP (11–2)	Utah (12–4)	USC (13–3)	Houston (16–3)	North Carolina (16–5)	Davidson (19–4)	Davidson (22–4)	Penn (25–2)	13.
14.	St. John's	Marquette (2–0)	Illinois (4–0)	USC (4–2)	Wyoming (7–0)	Davidson (7–1)	Columbia (13–1)	Columbia (13–2)	USC (11–3)	Penn (16–1)	Wyoming (15–4)	Houston (18–3)	Drake (19–5)	UTEP (17–6)	Florida State (23–3)	14.
15.	Villanova	Purdue (1–1)	Washington (4–0)	Villanova (3–1)	Kansas (6–2)	Columbia (11–1)	UTEP (9–2)	USC (10–3)	Ohio (12–2)	Kansas State (14–3)	Marquette (14–3) т	Marquette (17–3)	Notre Dame (19–5)	Western Kentucky (21–2)	Long Beach State (24–3) т	15.
16.	St. Bonaventure	Notre Dame (3–0)	St. Bonaventure (2–0)	Davidson (3–1)	Davidson (4–1)	Oklahoma (10–1)	Penn (11–1) т	Penn (12–1) т	Penn (14–1) т	Davidson (14–3)	Notre Dame (14–5) т	Notre Dame (16–5) т	Western Kentucky (19–2) т	NC State (19–6)	Villanova (21–6) т	16.
17.	Arizona т	Illinois (2–0)	LSU (4–0)	St. John's (5–1)	Marquette (8–1)	Oregon (7–2) т	USC (10–3) т	Santa Clara (12–2) т	UTEP (11–3) т	Florida State (16–2)	Santa Clara (15–3)	Utah (16–6) т	Columbia (20–3) т	Cincinnati (20–4)	Utah State (21–6) т	17.
18.	New Mexico т	Colorado (3–1)	Dayton (3–0)	Wyoming (7–0)	Purdue (6–2)	Santa Clara (8–2) т	Utah (11–3) т	Wyoming (11–2)	Drake (13–4)	Santa Clara (13–2) т	Western Kentucky (15–2)	Western Kentucky (17–2)	North Carolina (17–6) т	Notre Dame (20–6)	Niagara (22–5) т	18.
19.	Louisville	Western Kentucky (2–0)	Jacksonville (4–0)	Jacksonville (5–0)	USC (5–3)	Utah (9–3) т	Wyoming (9–2) т	NC State (12–1) т	Santa Clara (13–2)	Utah State (13–3) т	Florida State (18–2)	Utah State (15–4)	Utah (17–7)	North Carolina (18–7)	Western Kentucky (22–3) т	19.
20.	La Salle	Jacksonville (2–0); St. Bonaventure (1–0)	Houston (5–0)	Marquette (5–1)	Colorado (6–3)	Washington State (9–2) т Wyoming (8–1) т	Niagara (11–0)	Drake (12–4) т Utah (11–4) т	Western Kentucky (12–2)	Houston (14–3) т Columbia (14–2) т	Illinois (12–5) т Ohio (15–3) т	Columbia (18–3)	Kansas State (18–5)	Villanova (19–6)	Cincinnati (21–5) т UTEP (17–7) т	20.
	Preseason	Week 1 Dec. 9	Week 2 Dec. 16	Week 3 Dec. 23	Week 4 Dec. 30	Week 5 Jan. 6	Week 6 Jan. 13	Week 7 Jan. 20	Week 8 Jan. 27	Week 9 Feb. 3	Week 10 Feb. 10	Week 11 Feb. 17	Week 12 Feb. 24	Week 13 Mar. 3	Final Mar. 10	
		Dropped: Kansas; St. John's; Arizona; New Mexico; La Salle	Dropped: Duquesne; Ohio State; Louisville (2–1); Marquette (4–1); Purdue (3–1); Western Kentucky	Dropped: Santa Clara; Colorado (5–3); LSU; Dayton	Dropped: Illinois; Villanova; St. John's	Dropped: Notre Dame; Penn (8–1); Kansas; Purdue; USC; Colorado	Dropped: NC State (11–1); Tennessee; Oklahoma; Oregon; Santa Clara; Washington State	Dropped: Washington; Niagara	Dropped: Columbia; Wyoming	Dropped: Ohio; UTEP; Western Kentucky	Dropped: Utah (14–6); USC (13–4); Kansas State; Utah State; Columbia (16–3)	Dropped: Wyoming; Santa Clara; Illinois; Ohio	Dropped: Utah State	Dropped: Columbia; Utah; Kansas State (19–6)	Dropped: Davidson (22–5); North Carolina (18–8)	
