= Jacksonville Dolphins men's basketball =

Men's college basketball team a Jacksonville University

2026–27 Jacksonville Dolphins men's basketball team
- University: Jacksonville University
- Head coach: Jordan Mincy (6th season)
- Location: Jacksonville, Florida
- Arena: Swisher Gymnasium (capacity: 1,450)
- Conference: Atlantic Sun Conference
- Nickname: Dolphins
- Colors: Green and white
- Student section: Phinatics / Barstooljax

NCAA Division I tournament runner-up
- 1970
Other NCAA Division I tournament results
Final Four	1970
Elite Eight	1970
Sweet Sixteen	1970
Appearances	1970, 1971, 1973, 1979, 1986

Conference tournament champions
- Sun Belt: 1979, 1986

Conference regular-season champions
- ASUN: 2009, 2010

The Jacksonville Dolphins men's basketball team represents Jacksonville University in the sport of basketball. The Dolphins compete in NCAA Division I's ASUN Conference (ASUN), having joined in 1998. Home games are played in the historic Swisher Gymnasium on the campus of Jacksonville University.

While the Jacksonville University's men's basketball team first took the court in 1948, the program did not join Division 1 until 1966. Early highlights included the program's first postseason appearance in the 1970 NCAA tournament and were the national runners-up in 1970 led by future Hall of Fame and ABA/NBA Star Artis Gilmore. They have appeared in five NCAA tournaments, most recently in 1986.

== History ==
=== Conference affiliations ===
- 1948–49 to 1956–57 – NJCAA Independent
- 1957–58 to 1965–66 – NAIA Independent
- 1966–67 to 1975–76 – NCAA Division I Independent
- 1976–77 to 1997–98 – Sun Belt Conference
- 1998–99 to present – Atlantic Sun Conference (Note: Formerly known as the Trans Atlantic Athletic Conference until 2001, and later known as the Atlantic Sun Conference until 2016 and then known as the ASUN Conference until 2023.)

== Postseason ==
=== NCAA tournament results ===
The Dolphins have appeared in the NCAA tournament five times and were the national runner-up in 1970. Their overall tournament record is 4–5.

Year	Round	Opponent	Result
1970	Regional Quarterfinals; Regional semifinals Regional Finals; Final Four; National Championship Game	Western Kentucky; Iowa; Kentucky; St. Bonaventure; UCLA	W 109–96; W 104–103; W 106–100; W 91–83; L 69–80
1971	Regional Quarterfinals	Western Kentucky	L 72–74
1973	Regional Quarterfinals	Austin Peay	L 75–77
1979	First round	Virginia Tech	L 53–70
1986	First round	Temple	L 50–61 ^{OT}

=== NIT results ===
The Dolphins have appeared in six National Invitation Tournaments. Their overall record is 6–7.

Year	Round	Opponent	Result
1972	First round Quarterfinals; Semifinals; 3rd-place game	Fordham; Lafayette; Maryland; St. John's	W 94–75; W 87–76; L 77–91; W 83–80
1974	First round Quarterfinals; Semifinals; 3rd-place game	Massachusetts; Maryland–Eastern Shore; Purdue; Boston College	W 73–69; W 85–83; L 63–78; L 77–87
1980	First round	Murray State	L 49–53
1987	First round	Vanderbilt	L 72–74
2009	First round	Florida	L 62–84
2010	First round Second Round	Arizona State; Texas Tech	W 67–66; L 64–69

=== CBI results ===
The Dolphins have participated in one College Basketball Invitational (CBI) tournament. Their record is 0–1.

Year	Round	Opponent	Result
2025	Quarterfinals	Incarnate Word	L 71–87

=== CIT results ===
The Dolphins have appeared in two CollegeInsider.com Postseason Tournament. Their overall record is 1–2.

Year	Round	Opponent	Result
2011	First round Second Round	East Carolina; SMU	W 71–66 ^{OT} L 62–63
2017	First round	Saint Francis (PA)	L 76–78

=== NAIA results ===
The Dolphins have appeared in one NAIA tournament. Their overall record is 0–1.

Year	Round	Opponent	Result
1965	First round	Central State (Ohio)	L 57–78

== Notable players ==
=== Retired numbers ===
Jacksonville has retired seven jersey numbers.

Jacksonville Dolphins retired numbers
No.	Player	Pos.	Career
3	Ben Smith	PG	2006–2010
4	Dee Brown	PG	1986–1990
24	Rex Morgan	SG	1968–1970
32	Otis Smith	SG / SF	1982–1986
43	James Ray	PF	1976–1980
52	Roger Strickland	F	1960–1963
53	Artis Gilmore	C	1969–1971
