= 1970 NCAA University Division basketball championship game =

1970 NCAA Tournament Championship Game
National championship game
UCLA Bruins	Jacksonville Dolphins
Pac-8	Independent
(27-2)	(27-1)
80	69
Head coach: John Wooden	Head coach: Joe Williams
- AP: 2
- Coaches: 2
- AP: 4
- Coaches: 5
	1st half	2nd half	Total
UCLA Bruins	41	39	80
Jacksonville Dolphins	36	33	69
- Date: March 21, 1970
- Venue: Cole Field House, College Park, Maryland
- MVP: Sidney Wicks, UCLA
- Favorite: UCLA
- Attendance: 14,380

United States TV coverage
- Network: NBC
- Announcers: Curt Gowdy and Tom Hawkins

The 1970 NCAA University Division Basketball Championship Game was the finals of the 1970 NCAA University Division basketball tournament and it determined the national champion for the 1969-70 NCAA University Division men's basketball season. The game was played on March 21, 1970, at the Cole Field House in College Park, Maryland and featured the three-time defending national champion UCLA Bruins of the Pacific-8 Conference, and the independent Jacksonville Dolphins.

The Bruins defeated the Dolphins to win their fourth straight national championship.

== Participating teams ==
=== UCLA Bruins ===
- West
  - UCLA 88, Long Beach State 65
  - UCLA 101, Utah State 79
- Final Four
  - UCLA 93, New Mexico State 77

=== Jacksonville Dolphins ===
- Mideast
  - Jacksonville 109, Western Kentucky 96
  - Jacksonville 104, Iowa 103
  - Jacksonville 106, Kentucky 100
- Final Four
  - Jacksonville 91, St. Bonaventure 83

== Game summary ==
NBC

March 21, 1970

#2 UCLA Bruins 80, #4 Jacksonville Dolphins 69
Scoring by half: 41-36, 39-33
Pts: Curtis Rowe 19; Rebs: Sidney Wicks 18; Asts: John Vallely 5	Pts: Artis Gilmore 19; Rebs: Artis Gilmore 16; Asts: Rex Morgan 11

Cole Field House, College Park, Maryland
Attendance: 14,380
