= Robert Sassone (basketball) =

American basketball player and coach (1931–2025)

Personal information
- Born: May 9, 1931 Brooklyn, New York, U.S.
- Died: February 9, 2023 (aged 91)
- Listed height: 6 ft 0 in (1.83 m)
- Listed weight: 190 lb (86 kg)

Career information
- College: St. Bonaventure (1950–1953)
- NBA draft: 1953: 9th round
- Drafted by: Philadelphia Warriors
- Stats at Basketball Reference

Robert Sassone (May 9, 1931 – February 5, 2023) was an American college basketball player and coach.

== Career ==
Born in Brooklyn, New York, Sassone went to St. Bonaventure University on a basketball scholarship the fall of 1949. He led the team to the 1951 National Invitation Tournament as a sophomore. He was credited as the first player in college basketball history to take a charge from the opposing player, thus getting the ball for his team. He graduated in 1953 and was drafted in the third round of the 1953 NBA draft by the Philadelphia Warriors. He was drafted into the US Army and served from September 1953 to September 1955. He passed on the NBA to become an educator and raise a family.

Sassone coached Olean High School to a basketball championships in 1968. He resigned in 1968 to rejoin St. Bonaventure as an assistant coach. Sassone represented St . Bonaventure in thirteen post season tournaments as a player and a coach.was an integral part of their Final Four team in 1970 as well as the 1977 National Invitational Championship. He went on to coach overseas every summer

In 2009, he was asked to contribute analysis for sashavujacic18.com. Sasha was a player on the LA Lakers who came from Slovenia, formerly a part of Yugoslavia.

His coaching experience included giving clinics in Yugoslavia and Italy from 1978 to 1990. His specialty was coaching defense and he coached numerous Yugoslavian players who went to the NBA.

Sassone died on February 5, 2023, at the age of 91.

== Awards ==
- Sassone is a 1990 St. Bonaventure Sports Hall of Fame inductee.
- Sassone led A. Lincoln HS to the New York City PSAL Basketball Championship in 1949. He was chosen to the Journal American All City first team. He led St. Bonaventure University (SBU) to the National Invitation Tournament (NIT) in 1951 and 1952. He was chosen to the All NIT team in 1952.
- He was an Assistant Basketball coach at St. Bonaventure 1957–1961, and 1968–1982. He also took part in thirteen post season tournaments as a player and coach at SBU. He was a coach in the 1970 Final Four and the 1977 National Invitational Tournament Championship.
