= 1970 NCAA University Division basketball tournament =

Edition of USA college basketball tournament

- Season: 1969–70
- Teams: 25
- Finals site: Cole Field House, College Park, Maryland
- Champions: UCLA Bruins (6th title, 6th title game, 7th Final Four)
- Runner-up: Jacksonville Dolphins (1st title game, 1st Final Four)
- Semifinalists: New Mexico State Aggies (1st Final Four); St. Bonaventure Brown Indians (1st Final Four)
- Winning coach: John Wooden (6th title)
- MOP: Sidney Wicks (UCLA)
- Attendance: 146,794
- Top scorer: Austin Carr (Notre Dame) (158 points)

The 1970 NCAA University Division basketball tournament involved 25 schools playing in single-elimination play to determine the national champion of men's NCAA Division I college basketball. The 32nd annual edition of the tournament began on March 7, 1970, and ended with the championship game on March 21, at Cole Field House, located on the campus of the University of Maryland in College Park. A total of 29 games were played, including a third-place game in each region and a national third-place game. This tournament was notable for the number of small schools that reached the Sweet 16, Elite 8, Final 4, and championship Game. Another notable aspect of the tournament was that Marquette became the first team to turn down an announced NCAA Tournament bid for the National Invitation Tournament. Coach Al McGuire took issue with being seeded in the Midwest regional instead of the geographically closer Mideast. They were replaced in the field by Dayton. As a result of this action, the NCAA now forbids its members from playing in other postseason tournaments if offered an NCAA bid.

There were three first time participants in the Final Four: New Mexico State, St. Bonaventure, and Jacksonville, a feat not repeated until the 2023 tournament. UCLA, coached by John Wooden, won their 6th national title with an 80–69 victory in the final game over Jacksonville, coached by Joe Williams. Sidney Wicks of UCLA was named the tournament's Most Outstanding Player.

== Schedule and venues ==
The following are the sites that were selected to host each round of the 1970 tournament:

First round

- March 7
  - East Region
    - Alumni Hall, Jamaica, New York (Host: St. John's University)
    - The Palestra, Philadelphia, Pennsylvania (Host: University of Pennsylvania)
    - Jadwin Gymnasium, Princeton, New Jersey (Host: Princeton University)
  - Mideast Region
    - University of Dayton Arena, Dayton, Ohio (Host: University of Dayton)
  - Midwest Region
    - Daniel-Meyer Coliseum, Fort Worth, Texas (Host: Texas Christian University)
  - West Region
    - Smith Fieldhouse, Provo, Utah (Host: Brigham Young University)

Regional semifinals, 3rd-place games, and finals (Sweet Sixteen and Elite Eight)

- March 12 and 14
  - East Regional, Carolina Coliseum, Columbia, South Carolina (Host: University of South Carolina)
  - Mideast Regional, St. John Arena, Columbus, Ohio (Host: Ohio State University)
  - Midwest Regional, Allen Fieldhouse, Lawrence, Kansas (Host: University of Kansas)
  - West Regional, Hec Edmundson Pavilion, Seattle, Washington (Host: University of Washington)

National semifinals, 3rd-place game, and championship (Final Four and championship)

- March 19 and 21
  - Cole Field House, College Park, Maryland (Host: University of Maryland, College Park)

== Teams ==
Region	Team	Coach	Conference	Finished	Final opponent	Score
East
East	Davidson	Terry Holland	Southern	First round	St. Bonaventure	L 85–72
East	Niagara	Frank Layden	Independent	Regional Fourth Place	NC State	L 108–88
East	NC State	Norm Sloan	Atlantic Coast	Regional third place	Niagara	W 108–88
East	Penn	Dick Harter	Ivy League	First round	Niagara	L 79–69
East	St. Bonaventure	Larry Weise	Independent	Fourth Place	New Mexico State	L 79–73
East	Temple	Harry Litwack	Middle Atlantic	First round	Villanova	L 77–69
East	Villanova	Jack Kraft	Independent	Regional Runner-up	St. Bonaventure	L 97–74
Mideast
Mideast	Iowa	Ralph Miller	Big Ten	Regional third place	Notre Dame	W 121–106
Mideast	Jacksonville	Joe Williams	Independent	Runner Up	UCLA	L 80–69
Mideast	Kentucky	Adolph Rupp	Southeastern	Regional Runner-up	Jacksonville	L 106–100
Mideast	Notre Dame	John Dee	Independent	Regional Fourth Place	Iowa	L 121–106
Mideast	Ohio	James Snyder	Mid-American	First round	Notre Dame	L 112–82
Mideast	Western Kentucky	Johnny Oldham	Ohio Valley	First round	Jacksonville	L 109–96
Midwest
Midwest	Dayton	Don Donoher	Independent	First round	Houston	L 71–64
Midwest	Drake	Maury John	Missouri Valley	Regional Runner-up	New Mexico State	L 87–78
Midwest	Houston	Guy Lewis	Independent	Regional Fourth Place	Kansas State	L 107–98
Midwest	Kansas State	Cotton Fitzsimmons	Big Eight	Regional third place	Houston	W 107–98
Midwest	New Mexico State	Lou Henson	Independent	Third Place	St. Bonaventure	W 79–73
Midwest	Rice	Don Knodel	Southwest	First round	New Mexico State	L 101–77
West
West	Long Beach State	Jerry Tarkanian	Pacific Coast	Regional Fourth Place	Santa Clara	L 89–86
West	Santa Clara	Dick Garibaldi	West Coast	Regional third place	Long Beach State	W 89–86
West	UTEP	Don Haskins	Western Athletic	First round	Utah State	L 91–81
West	UCLA	John Wooden	Pacific-8	Champion	Jacksonville	W 80–69
West	Utah State	LaDell Andersen	Independent	Regional Runner-up	UCLA	L 101–79
West	Weber State	Phil Johnson	Big Sky	First round	Long Beach State	L 92–73

== Bracket ==
=== East region ===
Quarterfinals
St. Bonaventure	85
Davidson	72
Villanova	77
Temple	69
Niagara	79
Penn	69

Semifinals
NC State	68
St. Bonaventure	80
Villanova	98
Niagara	73

Finals
St. Bonaventure	97
Villanova	74

East Regional third place
NC State	108
Niagara	88

=== Mideast region ===
Quarterfinals
Jacksonville	109
Western Kentucky	96
Notre Dame	112
Ohio	82

Semifinals
Iowa	103
Jacksonville	104
Kentucky	109
Notre Dame	99

Finals
Jacksonville	106
Kentucky	100

Mideast Regional third place
Iowa	121
Notre Dame	106

=== Midwest region ===
Quarterfinals
New Mexico State	101
Rice	77
Houston	71
Dayton	64

Semifinals
Kansas State	66
New Mexico State	70
Drake	92
Houston	87

Finals
New Mexico State	87
Drake	78

Midwest Regional third place
Kansas State	107
Houston	98

=== West region ===
Quarterfinals
Long Beach State	92
Weber State	73
Utah State	91
UTEP	81

Semifinals
UCLA	88
Long Beach State	65
Santa Clara	68
Utah State	69

Finals
UCLA	101
Utah State	79

West Regional third place
Long Beach State	86
Santa Clara	89

=== Final Four ===
National semifinals
E	St. Bonaventure	83
ME	Jacksonville	91
MW	New Mexico State	77
W	UCLA	93

National Championship Game
ME	Jacksonville	69
W	UCLA	80
National third-place game
E	St. Bonaventure	73
MW	New Mexico State	79

== See also ==
- 1970 NCAA College Division basketball tournament
- 1970 National Invitation Tournament
- 1970 NAIA Division I men's basketball tournament
- 1970 National Women's Invitation Tournament

== Tournament notes ==
- In Iowa's 121–106 win over Notre Dame, the two teams set a tournament record for most combined points (227).
- Every game in the Mideast Regional saw at least one of the two teams score 100 points or more.
- For the second straight year, a first-time tournament participant, in this case Jacksonville, made the national championship game. Niagara and Long Beach State also made their tournament debuts this year, both of whom placed as their respective regional fourth place teams.
- This was the first of eighteen tournament appearances for Long Beach coach Jerry Tarkanian, who would go on to coach the 49ers to four straight tournament appearances, as well as the UNLV Runnin' Rebels to a national championship (1990) and four Final Fours, and Fresno State to two tournament appearances.
- The 1970 tournament is, to date, the most recent tournament appearance for Rice University. They currently hold the fifth longest active drought after Dartmouth (1959), Tennessee Tech (1963), Bowling Green and Columbia (1968) and Seattle (1969).
- Three of the Final Four teams had dominant centers that would go on to successful NBA careers: Jacksonville with Artis Gilmore, St. Bonaventure with Bob Lanier (who was injured in the East Regional final and did not play in the Final Four), and New Mexico State with Sam Lacey; Gilmore and Lanier have been inducted into the Naismith Memorial Basketball Hall of Fame. However, UCLA would win the tournament despite losing their dominant center from the previous season (Lew Alcindor).

== Announcers ==
Curt Gowdy, Charlie Jones, and Jim Simpson - First Round at Dayton, Ohio (Jacksonville-Western Kentucky, Notre Dame-Ohio State);
