= Skiles =

Skiles may refer to:

People

- Jacqueline Skiles (born 1937), Americain printmaker and painter
- Jeff Skiles (born 1959), Americain pilot
- Marlin Skiles (1906-1981), American composer and arranger
- Scott Skiles (born 1964), American basketball player
- Wesley C. Skiles, (1958–2010), American cave diving pioneer
- William W. Skiles, William Woodburn Skiles (1849–1904) was a U.S. Politician
- William Vernon Skiles, (1879–1947), American mathematician
- William West Skiles
- Skiles and Henderson, US comedy duo
- Skiles Test, American businessman

Places

- Skiles Test Nature Park
