= Morlan =

Morlan may refer to:

== People ==
- A. R. Morlan (1958–2016), American author
- Dorothy Morlan (1882–1967), American Impressionist artist
- Eduardo Morlan (born 1986), Cuban minor league baseball pitcher
- Leire Morlans (born 1987), Spanish alpine skier
- John Morlan (born 1947), American pitcher in Major League Baseball

== Places ==
- Morlan Township, Graham County, Kansas, township in the USA
