= Skiles Test =

American businessman

Skiles Edward Test
- Born: October 19, 1889; Indianapolis, Indiana, United States
- Died: March 19, 1964 (aged 74)
- Burial place: Crown Hill Cemetery in Indianapolis, Indiana
- Occupation: Businessman
- Known for: House of Blue Lights
- Children: 1
- Parent(s): Charles Edward Test (father); Mary Elizabeth Test (mother)

Skiles Edward Test (October 19, 1889 – March 19, 1964) was a businessman and philanthropist from Indianapolis, Indiana. His name is associated with several landmarks in Indianapolis, including the historic Test Building, Skiles Test Nature Park, and Skiles Test Elementary School. The property that makes up part of Skiles Test Nature Park today was formerly his home, which was the source of the House of Blue Lights urban legend.

== Early life ==
Skiles Edward Test was born on October 19, 1889, to Mary Elizabeth Skiles and Charles Edward Test. He was the eldest of three children, including his siblings Dorothy and Donald. Test enrolled in Manual Training High School in 1905. A consistent honor-roll student, he graduated early in 1908. At the time of his father's death in 1910, Skiles Test inherited significant wealth from his father, who was one of the founders of the Diamond Chain Company and later one of the founders and president of the National Motor Vehicle Company.

== Career ==
Test took on several business ventures after becoming the head of the family in 1910. Like his father, Test was heavily involved in the automotive industry. He owned a Nash dealership and held multiple positions including president of Indianapolis Motor Inns and a director position at Indianapolis Railways, Inc. Test was considered an amateur inventor and had multiple patents under his name, including one assigned to Motor Inn Ramp Corporation for a multiple floor garage. During World War I, Test started a side venture making money through a garbage collection business that provided feed for his hog farm.

Skiles Test oversaw the construction of the Test Building in 1925, a multi-use development that was also one of Indiana's first multi-level parking garages. The building was controversial, initially being protested by locals over traffic safety concerns. The permissions for building were withdrawn in November 1923, but construction resumed after winning an injunction in December. Test was vice president and treasurer of the Circle Motor Inn, the parking garage segment of the building. His realty business, Test Realty Co., was also run out of one of the rooms within the building.

== Philanthropy ==
Test contributed to local charitable efforts throughout his life. On Christmas Eve of 1928, Test donated $700 and personal pocket flashlights to the police force in Indianapolis. The money was reportedly used to fund pensions and purchase new equipment. Later in his life, at the request of a schoolteacher named Daisy Slaughter, Test donated 20 acres (8.1 ha) of his land to the Lawrence Township Metropolitan School District for the establishment of a new elementary school. The school opened in 1965 under the name Skiles Test Elementary in his memory, with Test having died before construction of the school broke ground.

== Personal life ==
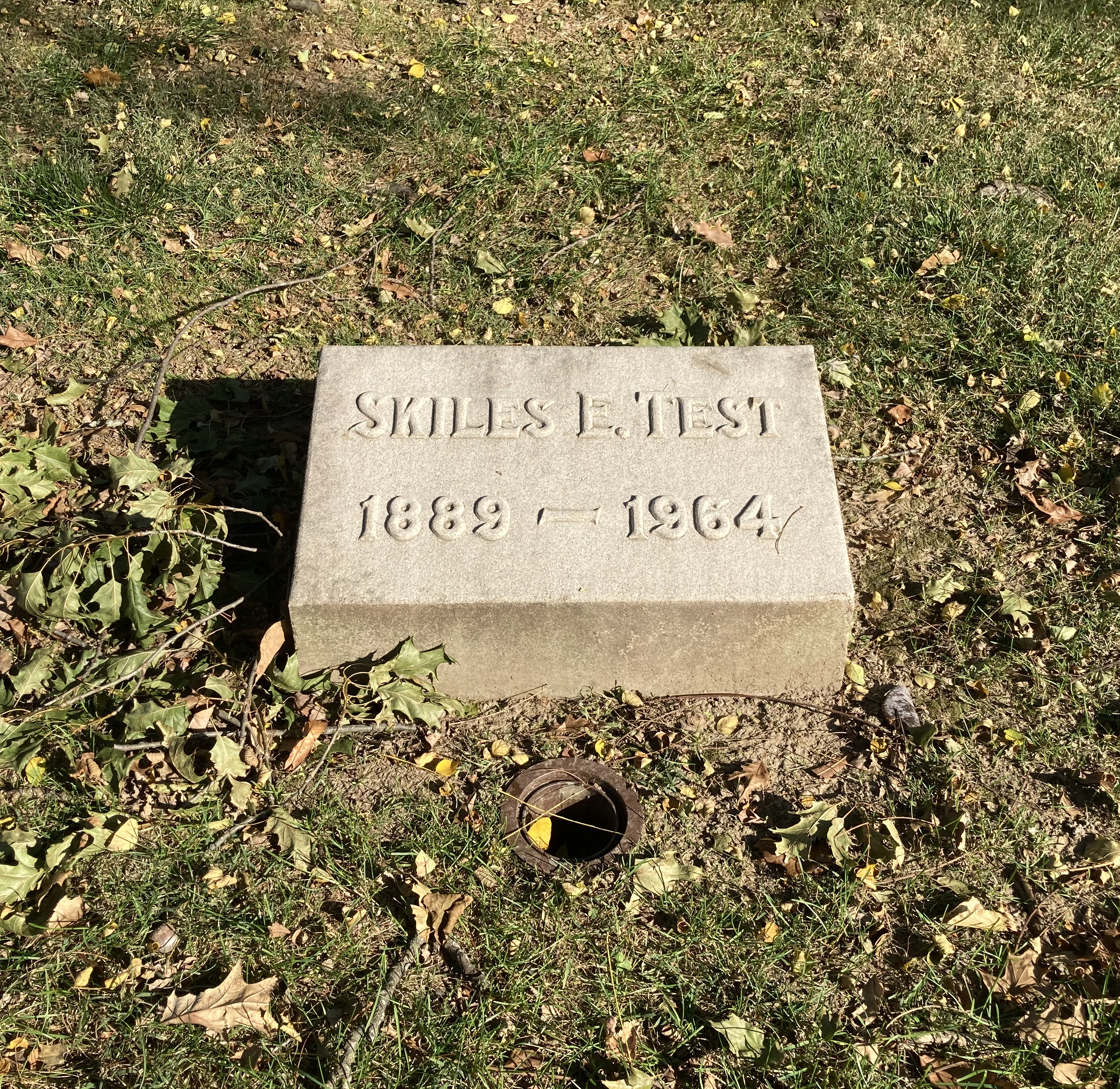
Gravestone of Skiles Test in Crown Hill Cemetery.

Test married his first wife, Josephine (née Benges), on July 14, 1913. They stayed married for twenty years before Josephine filed for divorce in 1933, with her being awarded $100,000 worth of alimony. Skiles Test became engaged to Elsa Pantzer Haerle in 1935, later marrying in 1936. The marriage was short lived, and Test met his third wife, Ellen Louise Saxon, around 1938 or 1939. They had one daughter together named Louellen. Contrary to popular belief, all of Test's wives outlived him. Test died March 19, 1964, and is buried in the Crown Hill Cemetery.

== House of Blue Lights ==
Test had a local reputation for eccentricity. Much of this was based on the urban legends surrounding his house, which became known as "the House of Blue Lights" for the many blue lights that constantly illuminated the house's exterior, including blue floodlights around the pool and blue Christmas lights strung on trees around the property. Other notable features of the property included glass block walls and white tile siding, a heated private pool, a three-story diving board, a bathhouse with an elevator, and a private pet cemetery.

According to the urban legend, the inhabitant of the house was a reclusive old man whose wife died in a tragic accident. Out of grief, he kept her casket in the living room surrounded by blue lights. The strange nature of the house frequently attracted trespassers and vandals, causing stress for Test, who often had to change living arrangements because of incidents. After a fire on the property, Test took to sleeping in the guest room on the second floor of his bathhouse because of its fireproof construction. He would later vacate the property at night in the years prior to his death.

The estate sale that took place after Test's death in 1964 was attended by around 50,000 people. Notable items sold include farm machinery, roughly 10,000–15,000 records, 75,000 hardware items, 20 rugs, and 6 cars. His house was demolished in 1978 and 86 adjoining acres were turned into the Skiles Test Nature Park according to his will.
