= Simon Baus =

American impressionist

- Born: 1882
- Died: 1969 (aged 86–87)
- Occupation: Painter

Simon Baus (1882–1969) was an American Impressionist from Indianapolis. Baus participated in the Indianapolis City Hospital project. Baus was also a member of the Irvington Group.

== Career ==
Simon Baus began his career as an artist at the John Herron Art Institute. Baus studied under William Forsyth, J. Ottis Adams, and Otto Stark. Baus began studying with Stark as a high school student at the Emmerich Manual Training High School. Baus became involved with the Indianapolis City Hospital project, and was a full-time artist on the project. Although Baus is best known for his portraiture, he was a significant contributor to the City Hospital project. Baus was a member of the Irvington Group, and won numerous awards during his career.

In regards to portraiture, Baus is best known for his portraits of Senator James Eli Watson, Ferdinand Schaeffer, Dr. F.S.C. Wicks, and Emmett Forrest Branch, Indiana's 31st Governor.

== Awards ==
- The First Wanamaker Prize (1919)
- J. I. Holcomb Prize (1919)
- Indianapolis Art Association Award (1921)
- Foulke Prize
- Studebaker Prize
- Hoosier Salon, Griffith and Kittle Prize
