= The House of Blue Lights =

House in Indianapolis, Indiana, USA

Coordinates: 39°52′10″N 86°03′00″W

The House Of Blue Lights was the name given to a house on the far northeast side of Indianapolis, Indiana, US. Decorated year round with blue Christmas lights, it was actually the home of eccentric Indianapolis millionaire Skiles Edward Test. It gained a reputation for being haunted and has become part of Indianapolis folklore.

== Background ==
According to local folklore, Skiles' deceased wife was embalmed in a glass coffin inside the house, surrounded by the eerie blue lights. In reality Test's wife and two ex-wives outlived him.

Test himself encouraged the rumors when he began burying the remains of some of his 109 pet cats in carpeted caskets under brass nameplates. After Test's death, no evidence was discovered that indicated his wife had been buried on the property, for, in fact, he had been married three times and all three women survived him. The public sale at auction of the possessions from the property did enhance the rumors of his eccentric later life. Nevertheless, the house was widely regarded as a "haunted" site well past Skiles' death in 1964 and is still recognized in the folklore and culture of Indianapolis.

In 1979 a local author named Kay Miclot selfpublished “Skiles Test and the House of Blue Lights” which was seen as "a flattering but somewhat inaccurate depiction" of Test by his nephew.

The house itself was originally of wood-frame construction, with a full exterior façade of white opaque glass brick. Many additions to the original farm house included glass solarium/greenhouses, and numerous lightning rods on the roof. A unique feature of the Test estate was an 40-by-80-foot (12 by 24 m) swimming pool with a three-story diving tower and motorized surfboard pulley system, and alongside of the pool, an ornate brick "pool house" with guest quarters. The solar-heated pool circulated its water through aboveground pipes that were heated in the sun and recirculated in the pool to keep the water warm.

Following the death of Skiles, his heirs bequeathed the property to the City of Indianapolis in 1974. Most of the structures remained standing but in ill repair until the Parks Department decided to demolish them all in 1978, despite public protest and interest by the Historic Landmarks Foundation of Indiana. Years later it was developed into a natural resource area called the Skiles Test Nature Park.
