= Kile Oak Tree =

Historic tree in Irvington, Indianapolis, Indiana, US

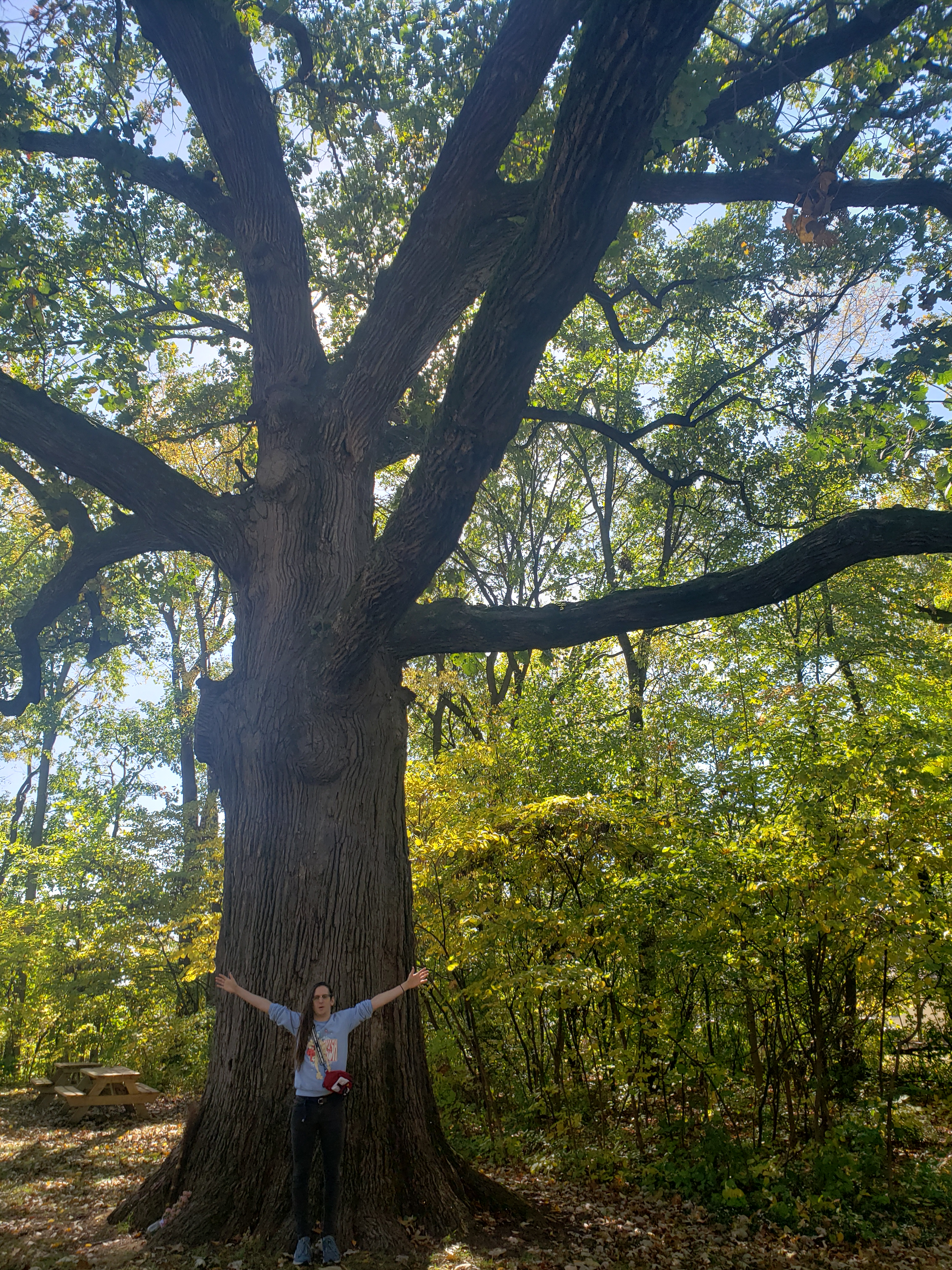

- Location within Indiana
- Species: Bur Oak (Quercus macrocarpa)
- Location: Indianapolis, Indiana
- Coordinates: 39.762667°N 86.065517°W
- Height: 87'
- Girth: 190 inches
- Diameter: 123'

The Kile Oak Tree is a bur oak tree that is a landmark in the Irvington Historic District in Indianapolis, Indiana. The tree is preserved by the Irvington Historical Society and Irvington Historical Landmarks Foundation. It is assumed to be "somewhere between 300 and 500 years old" and is one of the oldest trees in the city of Indianapolis.

== History and preservation ==
It is not known when Kile Oak Tree was planted. It has been estimated by arborists that it has been growing since before America was established.

The oak tree is named after Rev. Oliver Kile, who lived at 5939 Beechwood Avenue and died in 1924. After his death, his daughter, Mae Kile, campaigned to protect the tree for decades while living in the house her father had built next to it. In her campaign to protect the tree, Mae invited guests to the property and kept a guestbook for the Oak Tree, where visitors would record their names when visiting the site of the tree. Within the guestbook are signatures from international guests from China and India. This guestbook was created in 1928 and is now kept by the Irvington Historical Society. Mae fought to protect the Kile Oak Tree until her death. In 1973, after her death, the property was purchased by the Irvington Historical Society.

Fencing was added around the tree by Keep Indianapolis Beautiful in the Project 180/IPL Revive a Neighborhood 2001 projects. The site is currently maintained by volunteers.

In September 2024, the Kile Oak Tree sustained damage from storms caused by Hurricane Helene and was temporarily closed off due to safety concerns. The gates were reopened following the safe removal of damaged branches.

== Honors and awards ==
The Kile Oak Tree has been honored with two plaques. In 1973, the tree received a plaque in recognition from the Indiana Arborist Association. Then in 1976, the tree received a plaque as "Bicentennial Tree of the Year" in joint recognition from the International Society of Arboriculture and the National Arborist Association for having "lived here during the American Revolutionary Period".

== See also ==
- List of individual trees
- List of attractions and events in Indianapolis
