= Joe Rand Beckett =

- Born: March 2, 1891; Indianapolis, Indiana, U.S.
- Died: July 28, 1969 (aged 78); Pompano Beach, Florida, U.S.
- Education: University of Illinois, Indiana University Robert H. McKinney School of Law
- Occupations: Lawyer, Politician, Farmer
- Known for: Philanthropy
- Political party: Republican
- Board member of: Indianapolis Chamber of Commerce, Republican Veterans Association
- Spouse: Mary Ann Baker(1891–1996)
- Children: 1

Joe Rand Beckett (March 2, 1891 – July 28, 1969) was an American veteran of World War I, prominent lawyer in Indianapolis, Indiana, and a member of the Indiana Senate representing Johnson County and Marion County in 1929, 1931 and the special session in 1932 as well as assistant attorney general for the state. Shortly thereafter, he led the drive to build modern housing for low income residents of Indianapolis to improve conditions in the city.

== Early life and family ==
Joe Rand Beckett was born the son of Wymond Joe Beckett and Florence Ohio Rand in Indianapolis on March 2, 1891. His grandfather, Joe Smirthwinte Beckett, was from Sheffield, England, and settled in Dearborn County, Indiana, in about 1837. His mother was the granddaughter of Thomas Rand, an immigrant from Belfast, Ireland, who fought in the Revolutionary War and settled in Dearborn County in about 1811.

Beckett graduated from Emmerich Manual High School in Indianapolis in 1910 and graduated from the University of Illinois in 1914, where he studied architecture. He attended a predecessor of the now Indiana University Robert H. McKinney School of Law and was admitted to the bar in 1916. Shortly thereafter, he partnered with his father and they formed the law practice of Beckett and Beckett in Indianapolis.

Joe Rand Beckett and his wife had only one child, Joe Rand Beckett Jr., who was born on May 6, 1918. According to newspaper reports, he was a bright, talented youth who was about to attend the Culver Military Academy in the Fall. Near dusk on May 29, 1932, while his parents were out of town in Oxford, Ohio, he was accidentally shot and killed by a playmate with a 38 caliber pistol.

== Military service ==
A veteran of World War I, Mr. Beckett attended the first officers' training camp at Fort Benjamin Harrison in 1917, when he was commissioned a first lieutenant. He was promoted to captain of artillery and served overseas. Active in the American Legion, he was past commander of the McIlvaine-Kothe Post. He also served as state legislative chairman of the Legion. He was an army reserve officer for several years advancing to the rank of major.

== Philanthropy ==
Joe Rand and Mary Ann Beckett are recognized by the Laura Githens Society of the Indianapolis Zoo for including them in their estate plans.

== Legacy ==
Joe Rand Beckett was the Chairman of the Housing and Planning Committee and board member of the Indianapolis Chamber of Commerce instrumental in obtaining the loan for Indianapolis during the New Deal era during Franklin Delano Roosevelt's presidency.
