= Irvington Historic District (Indianapolis) =

Historic district in Indiana, United States

- U.S. National Register of Historic Places
- U.S. Historic district
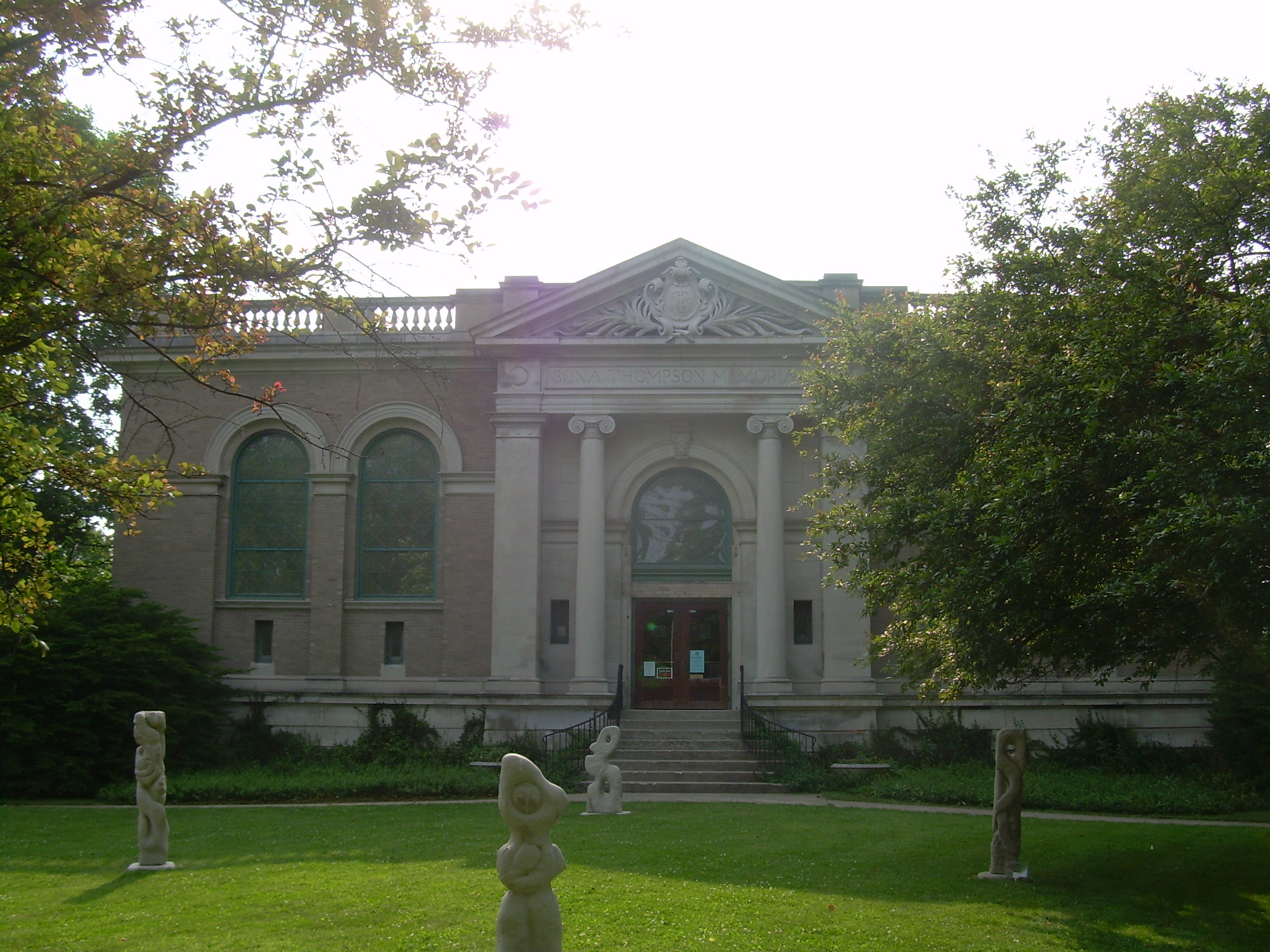
- Bona Thompson Memorial Library, the last remaining building of the old Butler University campus

- Location within Indianapolis Location within Indiana Location within the United States
- Location: Roughly bounded by Ellenberger Pk., Pleasant Run Creek, Arlington Ave., B & 0 RR tracks, and Emerson Ave., Indianapolis, Indiana
- Coordinates: 39°45′56″N 86°4′34″W
- Area: 545 acres (221 ha)
- Built: 1870
- Architect: Multiple
- Architectural style: Late 19th and 20th Century Revivals, Bungalow/Craftsman, American Four Square
- NRHP reference No.: 87001031
- Added to NRHP: May 29, 1987

The neighborhood of Irvington, named after Washington Irving, includes Irvington Historic District, a historic district in Indianapolis, Indiana. The historic district is a 545-acre (221 ha) area that was listed on the National Register of Historic Places in 1987. That year, the district included 2,373 contributing buildings, 5 other contributing structures, and 2 contributing sites.

== Historic Irvington ==
Founded in 1870 by Sylvester Johnson and Jacob Julian, Irvington was originally created as a suburban town of Indianapolis. It formed along winding roads of dirt and brick that reflected landscape design in the Romantic era. The town was built as a quiet suburb where artists, politicians, military generals, academics, and heads of local industry resided. In 1902, Irvington was annexed by Indianapolis.

Irvington is located five miles (8 km) east of downtown Indianapolis on the western edge of Warren Township. The neighborhood is situated on Washington Street, which is the route of the historic National Road, a National Scenic Byway. US 40 was formerly routed along the road. Through the early 1900s, a commuter rail/trolley system ran from Irvington to downtown Indianapolis along US 40, making Irvington a streetcar suburb of Indianapolis.

Irvington is the largest locally protected historic district in Indianapolis. The district includes roughly 2,800 buildings and about 1,600 parcels of land. Seventy-eight percent of Irvington homes were built before 1960. Irvington began petitioning its residents to support historic preservation in 2001 through the efforts of the Historic Irvington Community Council. The Irvington Historic District Neighborhood Plan was adopted by the Indianapolis Historic Preservation Commission on October 4, 2006.

== Butler University ==
From 1875 to 1928, Irvington was the home of Butler University. Butler transformed Irvington into a college community. The campus grew in the southwest corner of Irvington, between the Pennsylvania Railroad and the B&O Railroad tracks. Buildings at the campus eventually included the Main Building (1875), Science Building (1892), Women's Dorm (1880s), Bona Thompson Memorial Library (1903, later the Bona Thompson Memorial Center), and a World War I era gymnasium. The Christian Woman's Board of Missions built a missionary training school in 1909 adjacent to the campus. By the 1910s, the university had over one thousand students. All the Butler buildings have since been demolished except for the Bona Thompson Memorial Library and the President's Home (which became Irvington United Methodist Church, locally called the "Church on the Circle"). The Bona Thompson Memorial Center is the home of the Irvington Historical Society. It houses the society's art collection and historical documents. The art collection can be viewed in the rehabilitated gallery space. Also on display are various art shows, including a yearly juried show. Events from meetings to weddings and receptions are held at the center.

== Historic Irvington Halloween Festival ==
The Irvington Halloween Festival is a non-profit event founded in 1947 by the Irvington Community Council in an effort to bring together residents, neighborhood organizations, and businesses in Irvington for a celebration of heritage and community. The festival encompasses the week leading up to October 31, culminating in a street festival on the final Saturday. East Washington Street is closed through downtown Irvington to hold the street festival. Events include a 5-mile (8.0 km) run, a pageant, musicians, contests, Halloween-themed movies, storytelling, ghost tours, live theater, roller derby, a haunted puppet show, and dozens of other events.

== Arts ==
Irvington was the birthplace and home to the only historic art movement in Central Indiana named for a specific place, the Irvington Group. In the early 1900s, this group of artists lived, met, practiced and exhibited art in Irvington. Many of the artists' homes and studios remain standing throughout the community.

The Irvington Lodge, Bona Thompson Memorial Library, and The Studio School & Gallery are public venues where arts are taught and displayed throughout the Irvington neighborhood.

=== Irving Theatre ===
Built in 1913, the Irving Theatre was originally a nickelodeon. In 1926, the theatre went under major renovations, adding six rental units, a second story, and lengthening the theatre. Throughout the decades, the theatre's uses differed until it closed in the mid-1990s. It sat unoccupied until 2005, when it was reopened, and since then has been looking for funds for renovation. The theatre is a hub for live music, films, and art, community, and private events. Three apartment units are on the second floor.

The Irving is one of the city's largest all-ages music venues. With a capacity of over 700 people, the theatre aims to attract bands that would otherwise pass on an Indianapolis visit.

The Irving Theater hosts WOOT-FM Community Radio Project in the far western storefront. WOOT-FM is a not for profit community radio station featuring local musicians and acts. WOOT-FM's plan is to receive their LPFM license in the year 2014 serving the Indianapolis metropolitan area.

== Churches ==
One of the oldest churches in Irvington is an African-American congregation, Irvington Baptist Church. Formed in 1887, it is one of the oldest African-American congregations in Marion County. Other churches, such as Downey Avenue Christian Church, first met in the Butler University Main Building, and later built a church in the 1890s. Presbyterians gathered to form a church in the early 1900s, as the Methodists had done in the decades before. Catholics petitioned for a parish in 1909, which became Our Lady of Lourdes Catholic Church. All of these denominations maintain historic houses of worship.

== Schools and libraries ==
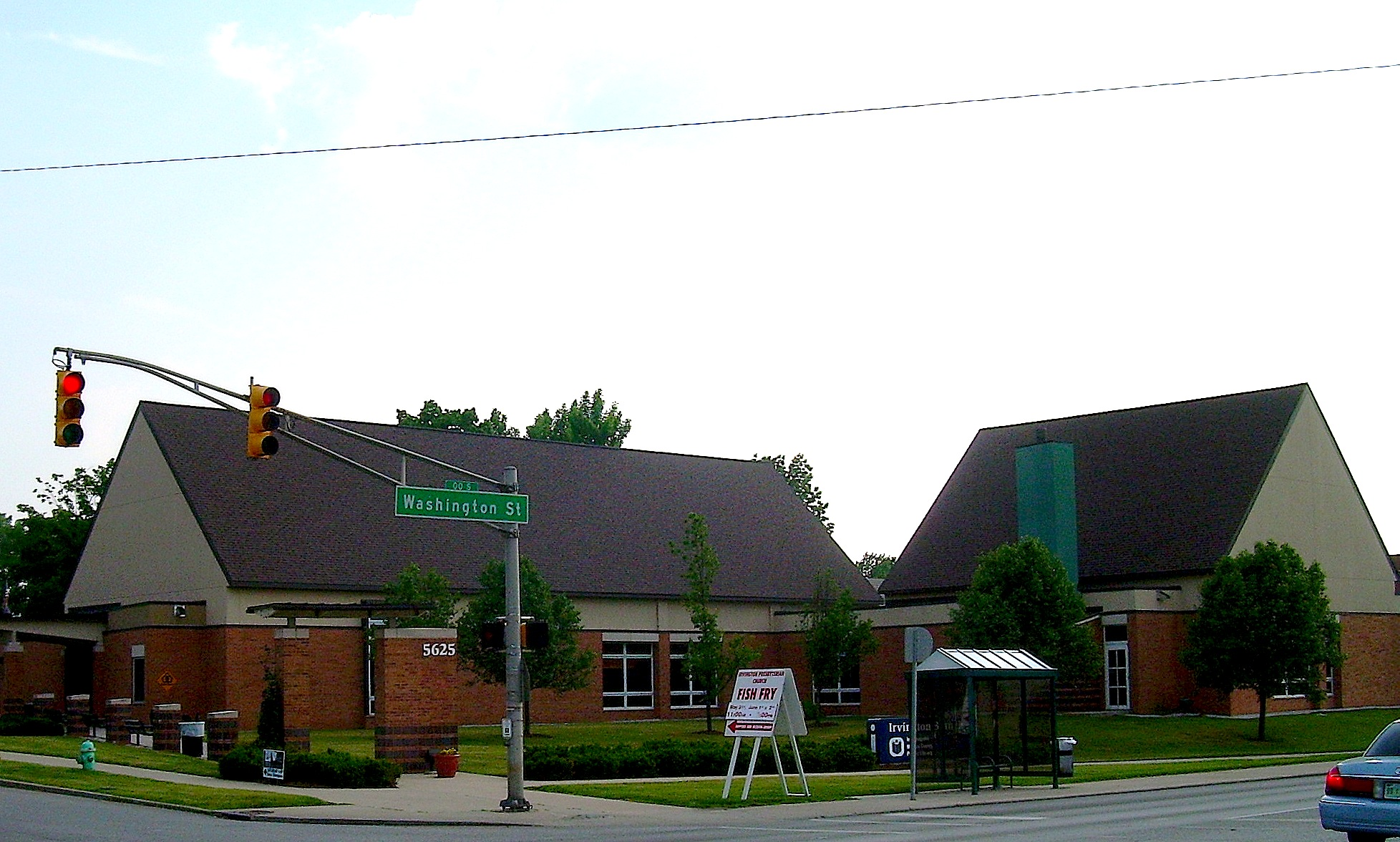
Irvington Branch Library

Irvington is home to local schools and a branch of the Indianapolis Public Library. George Washington Julian Elementary School #57 serves grades K–5, and Thomas Carr Howe Middle School serves grades 6–8. Both are part of the Indianapolis Public Schools. There are also three charter schools. Irvington Community School for grades K–5, Irvington Middle School for grades 6–8, and Irvington Preparatory Academy for grades 9–12. Together, these schools offer public education for grades K–12. Irvington is also home to the Roman Catholic school Our Lady of Lourdes, available for grades K–8.

Irvington has a long history of libraries. In 1903, the Bona Thompson Library was open to Butler students and the public. Since then, a local Irvington library has always been open to residents in different locations ranging from homes to particular structures. In 1956, the Hilton U. Brown Library, named in honor of the Irvington resident, opened on East Washington Street. In 2001, a new, state-of-the-art Irvington Branch Library opened at 5625 East Washington Street. The former Brown Library building is used for early education by Indianapolis Public Schools.

Irvington was also home to the Children's Guardian Home on University Avenue, before it was converted to a new high school for the Irvington Preparatory Academy.

== Historic structures ==
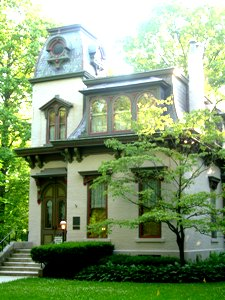
The Benton house

Irvington is both architecturally and culturally significant to Indianapolis and Marion County. The area contains excellent examples of every major American architectural style from 1870 to 1950, including Italianate, French Second Empire, Victorian Gothic, Queen Anne, Colonial Revival and Tudor Revival. However, Irvington is perhaps best known for its fine collection of Arts & Crafts architecture, including the only known example of a Gustav Stickley-designed house in Indiana.

Washington Street is home to several historic business buildings including the old bank, former Irvington Masonic Lodge No. 666 and the Irving Theatre.

=== Benton House ===
The Benton House was built in 1873 by Nicholas Ohmer and was the home of Allen R. Benton, a former president of Butler University. The Irvington Historic Landmarks Foundation was formed in 1966 to oversee the purchase and restoration of the house. In 1973, the home was placed on the National Register of Historic Places. It is the only house on the National Register on the Indianapolis East Side listed in the Historic Register that is available to the public.

=== Stephenson Mansion ===
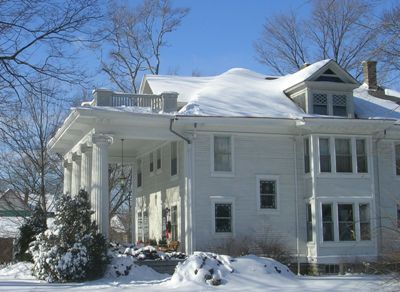
Stephenson Mansion

The Stephenson Mansion was listed on the National Register of Historic Places as the William H. H. Graham House in 1982. The home was built in 1889 for William H. H. Graham, who was associated with the Benjamin Harrison administration. It also served as a sorority home for Kappa Kappa Gamma students at Butler University in 1923. D. C. Stephenson acquired the home in 1923 and remodeled it to resemble a Civil War-era plantation home. The home is one of several in the neighborhood that are of interest to people who believe in haunted houses.

== Parks ==
Ellenberger Park is located in northern Irvington. The park was named for John Ellenberger, the farmer who owned the land prior to the city's original 32-acre (13 ha) purchase of the woods for the community in 1909. Additional acreage was purchased in 1911 and 1915, increasing the size of the park to 42 acres (17 ha). Landscape architect and urban planner George Kessler developed this park and Pleasant Run Parkway in the early 1900s as part of his Indianapolis Park and Boulevard System. Kessler's design retained much of the original character of the site, including a refusal to install walkways other than the preexisting paths.

In 1922, the city parks board renamed the park as Jameson Park in honor of Dr. Henry Jameson, the chairman of the board when the park and boulevard system was designed and constructed, but protests by Irvington residents resulted in the reversal of that decision in 1926. In 1930, the park added a pool, and in 1962, an ice rink was installed, which was later closed in 2009. The park also includes two playgrounds, eight tennis courts, a baseball diamond, softball diamond, football field, fitness trail, beach volleyball court, and a hill perfect for winter sports such as sledding and snowboarding. Ellenberger Park hosts outdoor movie screenings in the summer. In recent years, the city of Indianapolis has finished constructing the Pleasant Run Trail greenway. The trail currently runs 6.9 miles (11.1 km) and connects Ellenberger Park with Garfield Park, the oldest park in the city, on the near south side of Indianapolis; significant northern and southern expansions are planned for the trail.

Irving Circle Park occupies about 0.5 acres (0.20 ha) of green space encircled by S. Irving Circle near the intersection of S. Audubon Rd. and E. University Ave. The park includes a fountain, a bust of Washington Irving, and personalized brick paths. Band concerts are often held in the park throughout the summer season.

In September 2009, Mayor Greg Ballard and local citizens celebrated the opening of the Pennsy Trail, a 1.2-mile (1.9 km) walking, running, and biking trail between Arlington Avenue and Shortridge Road. Named for the Pennsylvania Railroad that ran through this area until its tracks were pulled up in 1982, most of the trail abuts residential housing. It also connects the Bonna Shops at Bonna and Audubon, and the Irvington Charter Elementary school.

The Kile Oak Tree, a 300- to 500-year-old bur oak, is located in the southeastern corner of the historic district. The tree is named after a former owner of the property and is now owned by the Irvington Historical Society. It is one of the oldest trees in Indianapolis.

== Notable residents ==
- Grace Julian Clarke, suffragist, journalist and author
- William Forsyth, artist
- Johnny Gruelle, illustrator and Raggedy Ann creator
- Helene Hibben, sculptor and educator
- Frank McKinney "Kin" Hubbard, cartoonist, humorist, author, journalist
- George W. Julian, politician, attorney and writer
- Gertrude Amelia Mahorney, translator and educator, first African-American college graduate in Indiana
- Dorothy Morlan, artist
- Constance Coleman Richardson, painter
- D. C. Stephenson, convicted rapist, murderer, and Grand Dragon of the Indiana Klan
- Clifton Wheeler, artist
- H. H. Holmes, serial killer and con artist, committed the murder of Howard Pitezel in Irvington in October 1894.

== Gallery ==
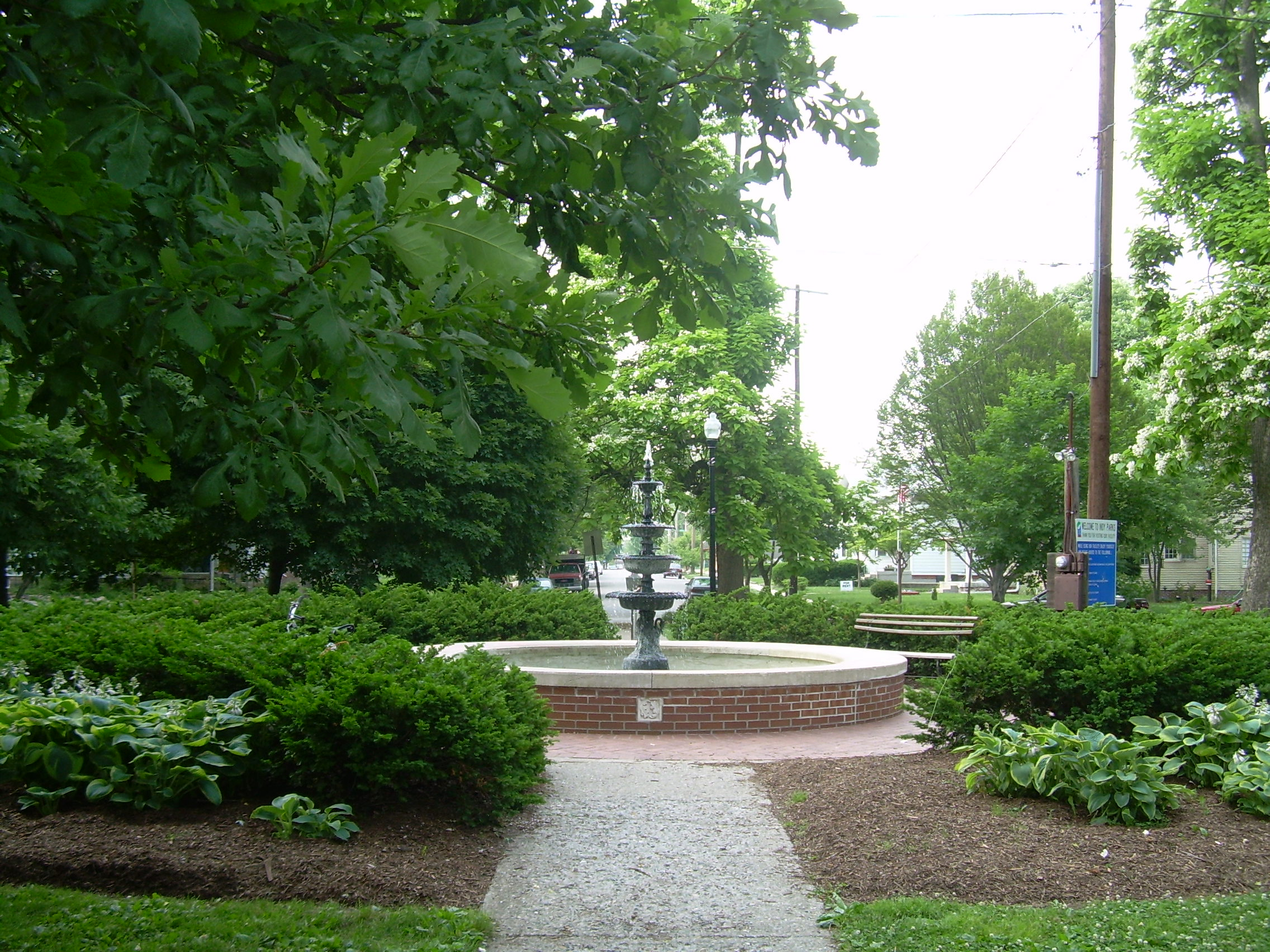

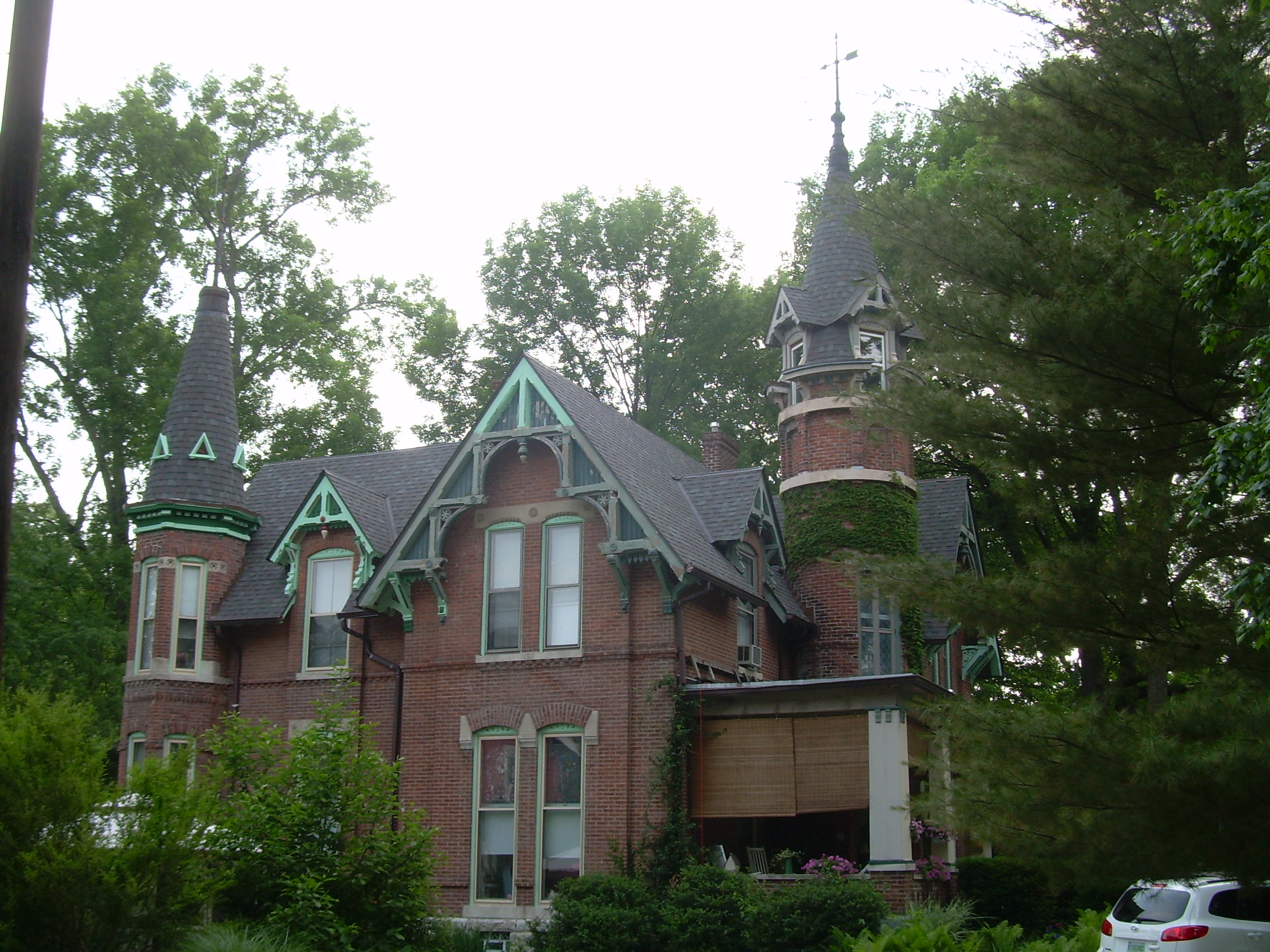

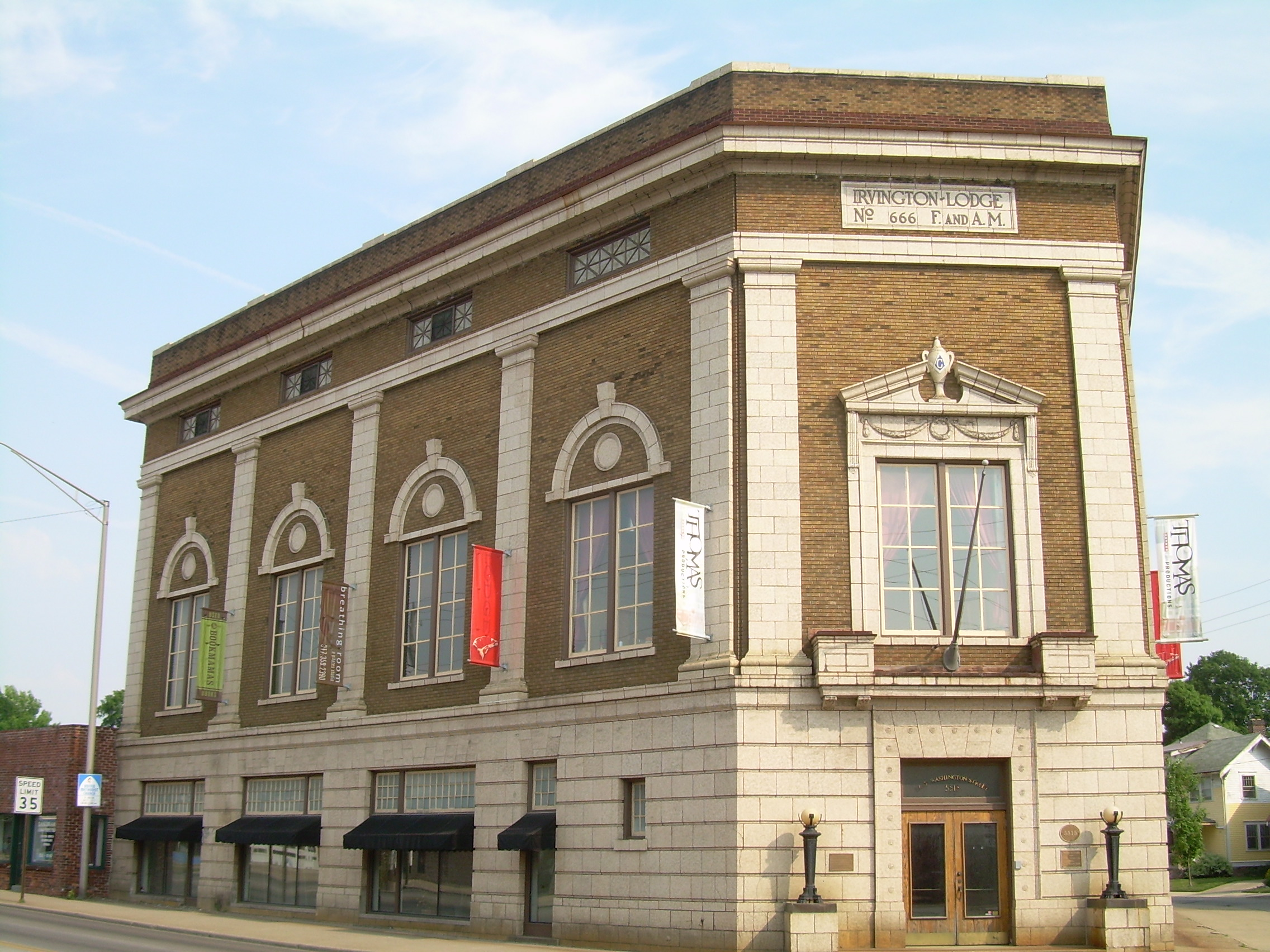

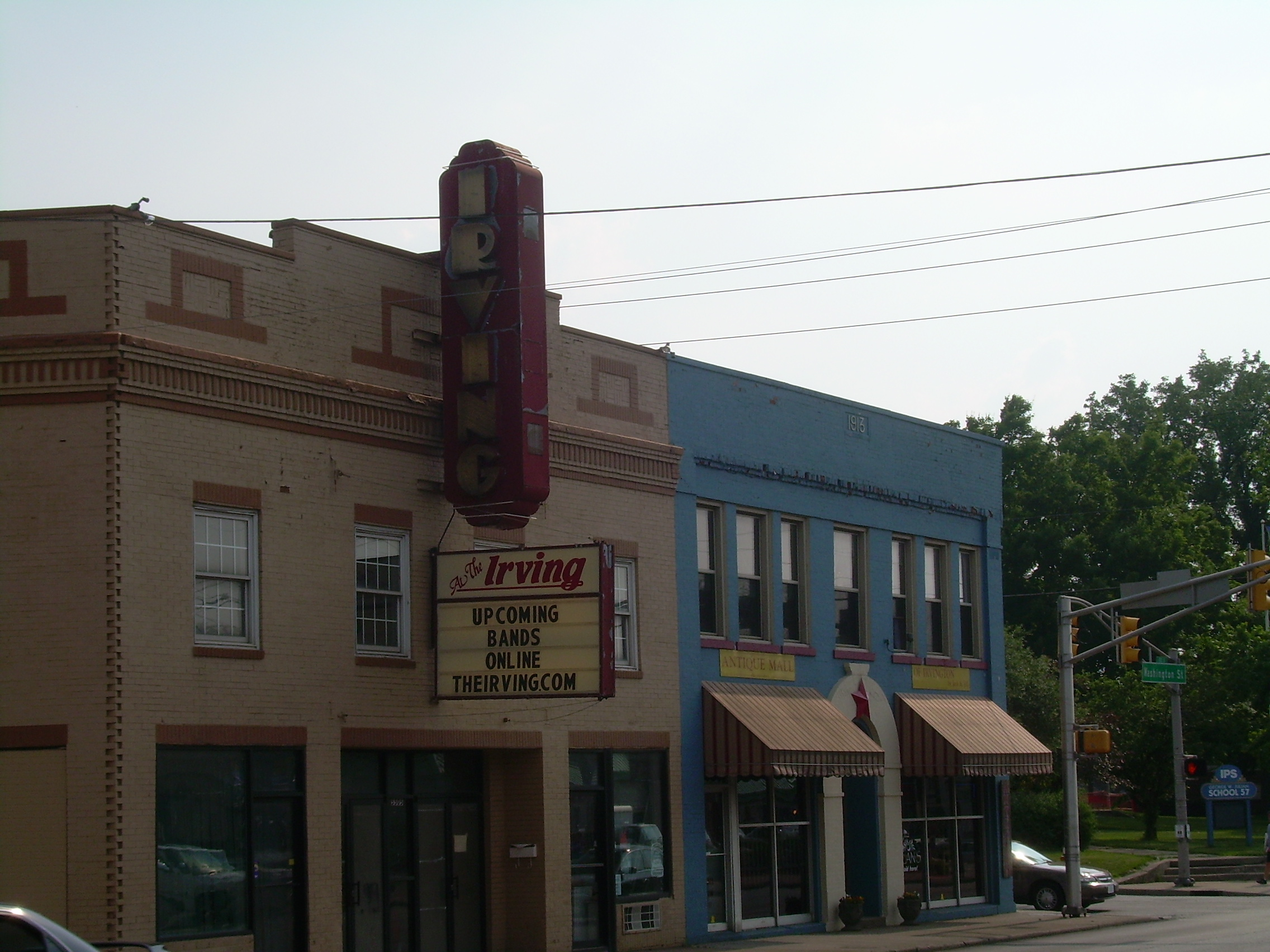

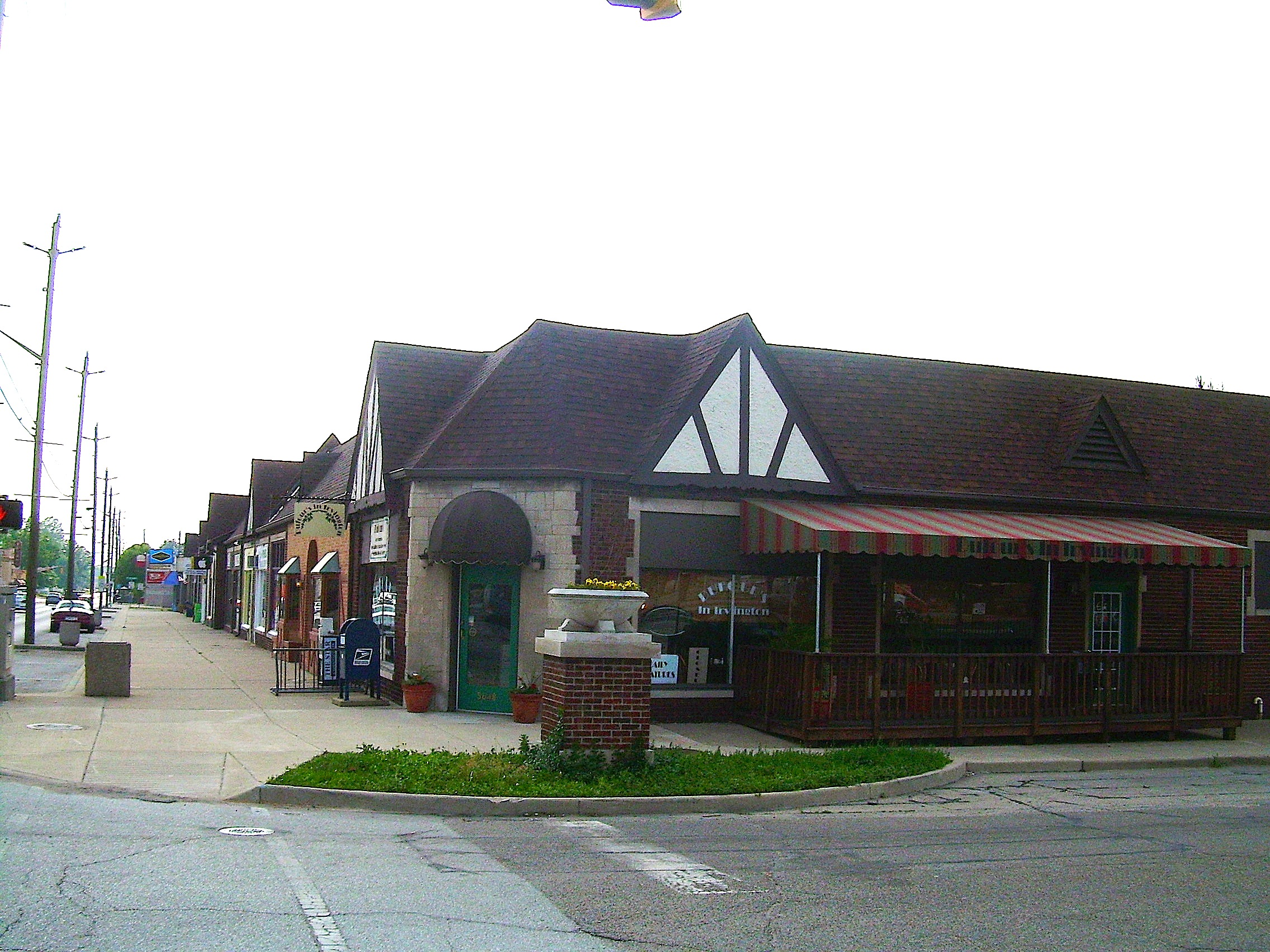

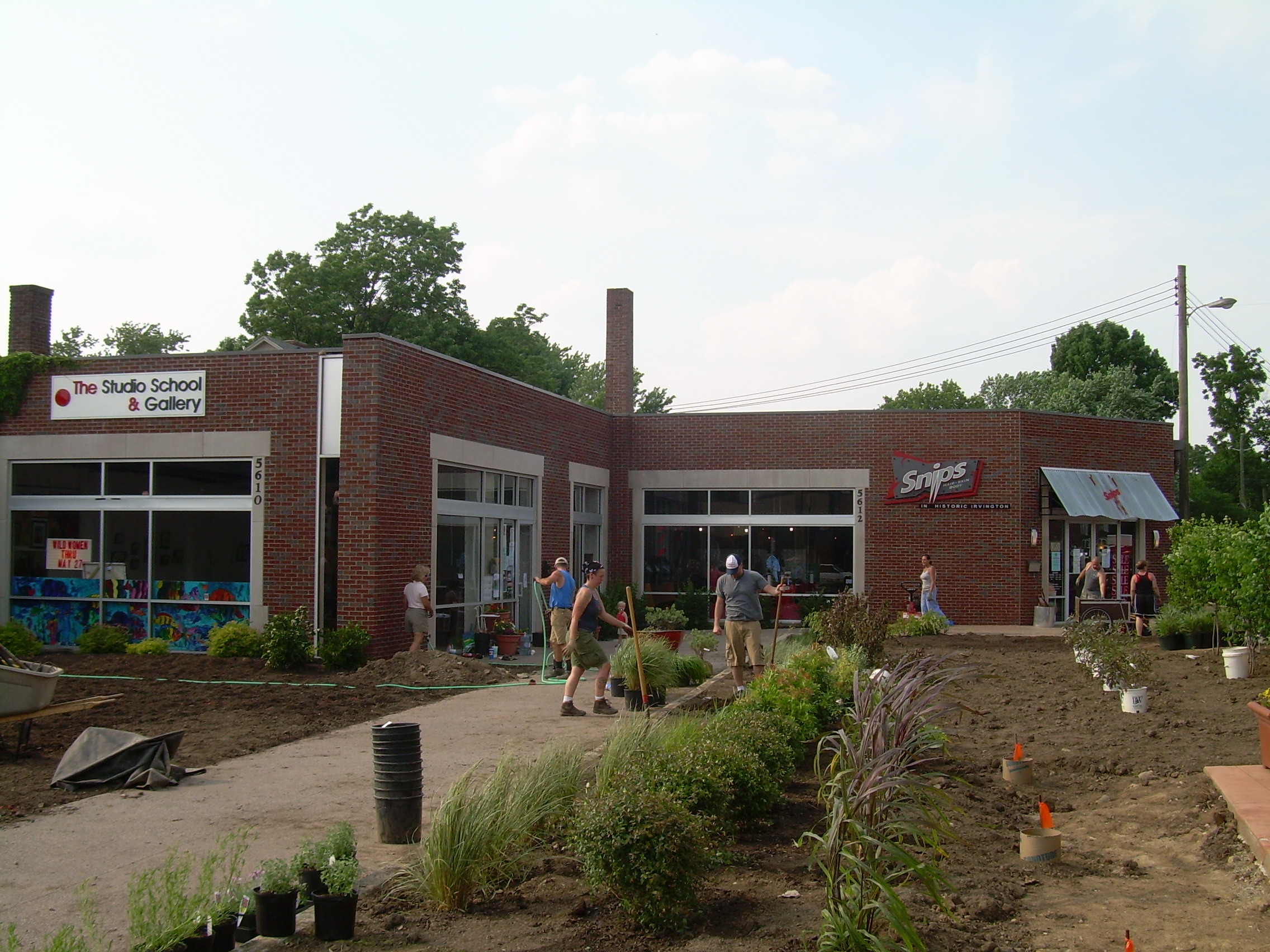

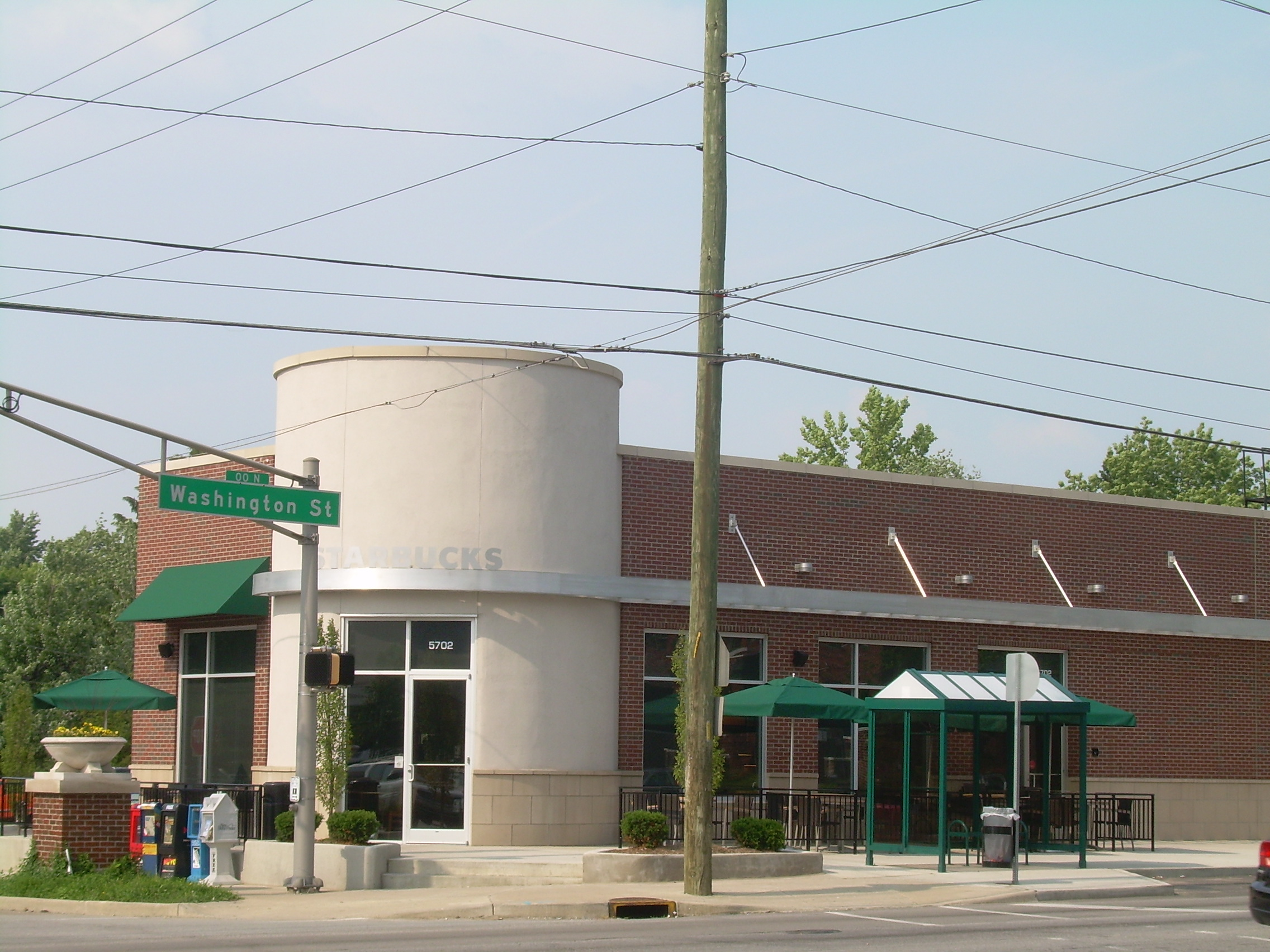

== See also ==
- Indianapolis Cultural Districts
- Irvington Terrace Historic District
- List of neighborhoods in Indianapolis
- National Register of Historic Places listings in Marion County, Indiana
- North Irvington Gardens Historic District
- Pleasanton in Irvington Historic District
