= Gertrude Amelia Mahorney =

First known African-American woman to graduate from an Indiana college

Gertrude A. Mahorney
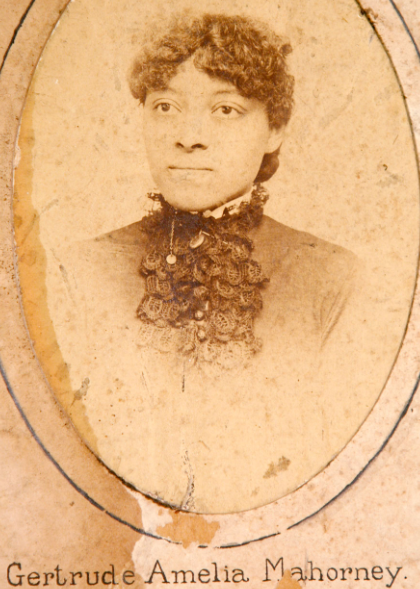
- Gertrude Amelia Mahorney, 1887 Butler University class photo
- Born: 1863 Oct 27; Indianapolis, Indiana
- Died: 1959 Apr 4
- Burial place: Woodmere Cemetery, Detroit, Michigan
- Spouse: Charles Augustus Reed (married about 1915)
- Parents: John Todd Mahorney; Ann Elizabeth Gray

Gertrude Amelia Mahorney became the first documented African-American woman to graduate from an Indiana college or university when she received a bachelor's degree from Butler University in 1887. In 1889, she also earned a master's degree from Butler.

== Early life and family ==
Born in Indianapolis, Indiana about 1863, Gertrude Mahorney was the daughter of John Todd Mahorney (1829–1890) and Ann Elizabeth Gray Mahorney (c. 1834 – 1904). Her parents owned an ornamental hair (wig) business on Illinois Street near the prestigious Bates House and were active in the antislavery National Negro Convention movement. John Mahorney entered the real estate business, was an author and was the first African-American in Marion County to become active in local Democratic politics. He was active in the labor movement, organizing the first African-American Knights of Labor assembly in Indianapolis. Gertrude was raised in the household with her step-grandmother, Johanna Gray, a Prussian and German speaker, and Gertrude became proficient in German.

In 1877, John Mahorney moved his family to Europe. Gertrude lived in London's East End and had opportunities to interact with people of diverse backgrounds. In 1879, they moved to Irvington, a suburb of Indianapolis, so that Gertrude and her brother could attend Butler University. While at Butler, Mahorney was confronted with racial segregation but “stood on her merits and...won the regard of students and professors.”

In 1890, her father, John T. Mahorney, died at their Irvington home and was buried in Crown Hill Cemetery. Two years later, Gertrude's brother, John Joseph Mahorney, a civil engineer and 1889 Butler graduate died at age 21 from appendicitis.

Gertrude lived with her mother until her mother died in 1904. The two often traveled together.

== Career ==
Proficient in the German language, Gertrude Mahorney translated stories that were published in local newspapers. She was an active newspaper columnist. In April 1889, she wrote to Mark Twain proposing an around the world trip for her entire family and suggested that he publish the book that they would write of their travels.

In 1891 and 1892, she taught in Leavenworth, Kansas and then continued her teaching career at Indianapolis Public School No. 23, a school for “colored” children living in the near northwest side of the city, and taught German at another nearby “colored” school, IPS No. 24. In 1904, Gertrude and her mother attended the St. Louis World's Fair where her students' work was exhibited.

Mahorney resigned her teaching position in the fall of 1906 to study in Pittsburgh and teach at Avery College & Trade School in Allegheny, Pennsylvania. When she returned to Indianapolis, she was only offered a substitute position in IPS. Unable to secure a permanent teaching position, she left Indianapolis in September 1910 to become the teacher in charge of the Ohio Street Colored School in Rockville, Indiana where she taught through May 1914.

In 1914, Gertrude was the President of the Woman Suffrage Club in Rockville, Indiana.

In 2016, Butler University honored her posthumously at a Founder's Day program with the presentation of her restored graduation photograph.

== Later life ==
In May 1914, she concluded her fourth year of teaching in Rockville, stopped to visit a friend at the Tuberculosis Hospital, and returned to Indianapolis.

In March & April 1915, she wrote to Butler University President, T. C. Howe, inquiring about selling the lot that she owned in Irvington that had been her brother's. It was lot 8 in Chambers First Subdivision, facing E Michigan St. She was then renting a furnished room at 263 Eliot St in Detroit, Michigan.

It appears that Gertrude married Charles Augustus Reed in 1915. The Indianapolis Star newspaper reported on 2 June 1915 that Gertrude M. Reed sold lot 8. After her marriage, Gertrude changed her reported age on official documents making herself 20 plus years younger.

Charles and Gertrude lived in Detroit, Michigan. He died in 1942, and she died on 4 April 1959. They are buried next to each other in Woodmere Cemetery.

The Butler University Archives and the Irvington Historical Society in Indianapolis continue to research Gertrude; please contact them if you have information on her marriage, her life after 1915, or her death.
