= Irvington Group =

American group of artists

The Irvington Group was a group of artists residing in Irvington, a suburb on the east side of Indianapolis, Indiana, during the 1920s and 1930s. This group of artists included some of the most well-known Hoosier artists, such as William Forsyth and Clifton Wheeler. Fifteen other professional resident artists belonged to the Irvington group, including Simon Baus, Paul Baus, Carolyn Bradley, Alice Cook, Robert Craig, Constance Forsyth, Martha Lee Frost, Helene Hibben, William Kaeser, Dorothy Morlan, Frederick Polley, Robert Selby, Hilah Wheeler, and Charles Yeager.

From 1928 to 1935, the Irvington Group held an annual exhibition featuring local art. "Eight of these ten exhibitions were held at Carr’s Hall. The first and ninth of the ten exhibitions were held on Carr’s first-floor auto showroom and in five of the contributing artists' homes/studios, respectively."

== See also ==
- Hoosier Group
- Richmond Group
