= Dorothy Morlan =

American painter

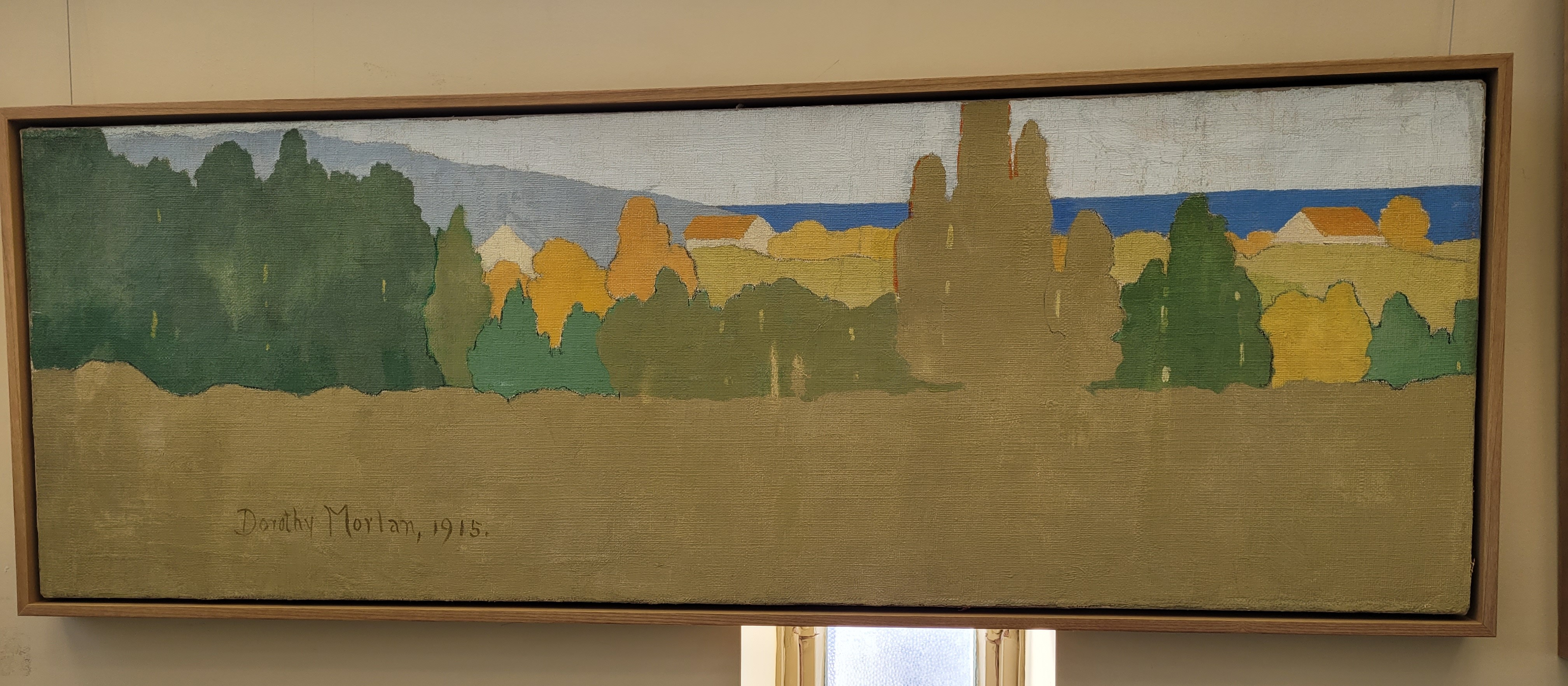
- Dorothy Morlan hospital mural, 1915
- Born: May 25, 1882; Salem, Ohio, US
- Died: October 25, 1967 (aged 85); Indianapolis, Indiana, US
- Occupation: Painter

Dorothy Morlan (May 25, 1882 – October 25, 1967) was an American Impressionist artist who was born in Salem, Ohio and lived in Indianapolis, Indiana.

== Biography ==
Mabel Dorothy Morlan was the daughter of Albert and Martha Morlan. Dorothy Morlan's father was an amateur painter, and taught Morlan how to paint at an early age. Morlan moved to Irvington, a suburb of Indianapolis, Indiana at a young age, and that is where the majority of her career as an artist took place. Morlan studied at the Herron School of Art and Design and was a known participant in the Indianapolis City Hospital Project.

== Career ==
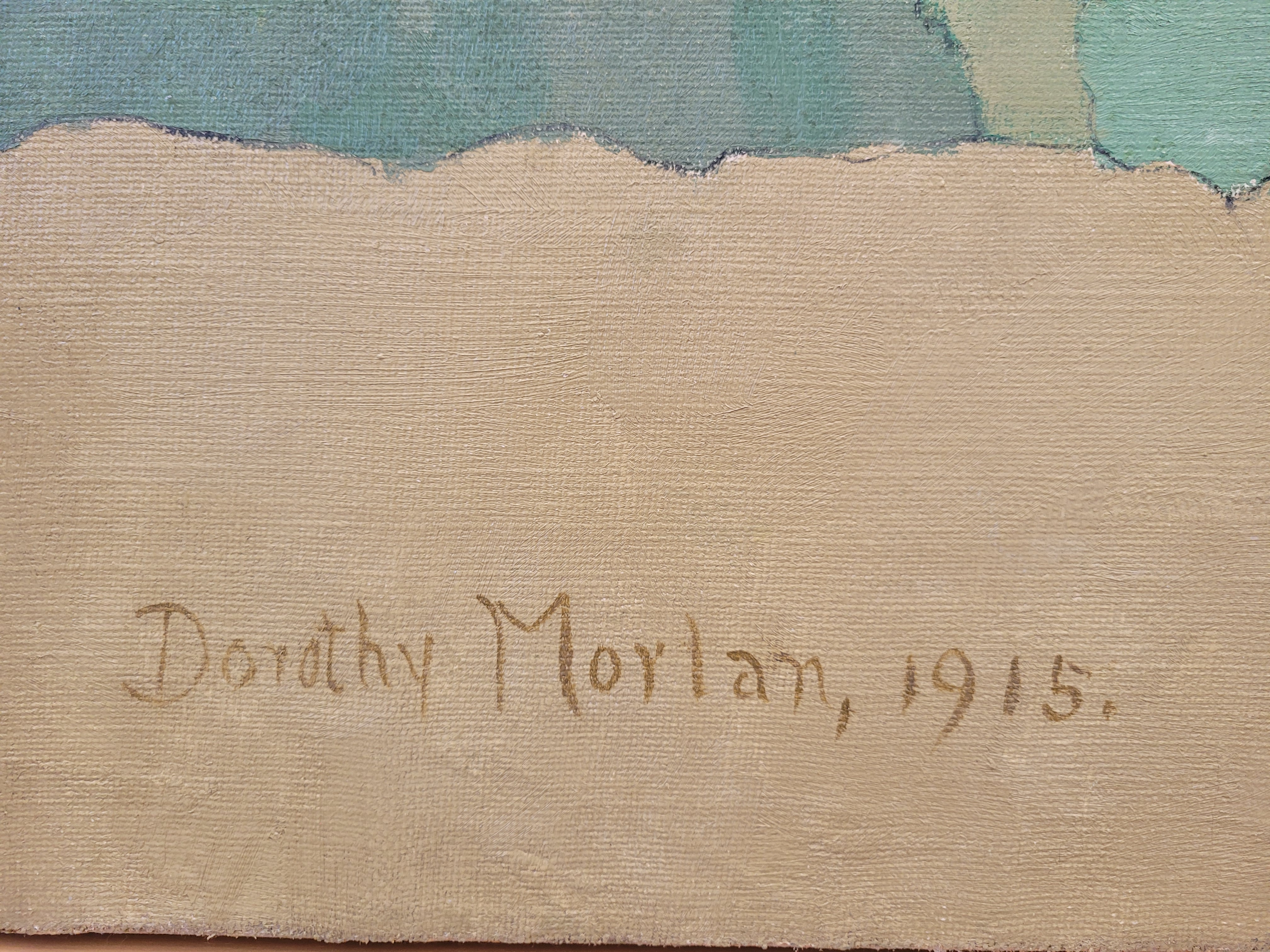
Dorothy Morlan signature

Dorothy Morlan began her career as a student at the John Herron Art Institute, where she began studying composition in 1905. She studied under J. Ottis Adams, and William Forsyth, and began to study landscape painting while at Herron. In 1933, the Institute hosted a one-person exhibition of her paintings. After studying at Herron, Morlan studied at the Robert Henri School of Art in New York and at the Pennsylvania Academy of the Fine Arts, under Daniel Garber. Shortly after her return to Indianapolis, she began the Indianapolis City Hospital Project under the direction of William Forsyth. Morlan's City Hospital murals were believed to be "lost" after multiple hospital renovations. They were later restored and are now in the collections of the Irvington Historical Society. Morlan was also a member of the Irvington Group, a group of artists that lived and taught in the Indianapolis suburb of Irvington.

Morlan suffered a stroke in the late 1940s which paralyzed her right side, ending her painting career; she remained an invalid until her death. She died in Indianapolis.
