= Test Building =

- U.S. National Register of Historic Places
- U.S. Historic district – Contributing property
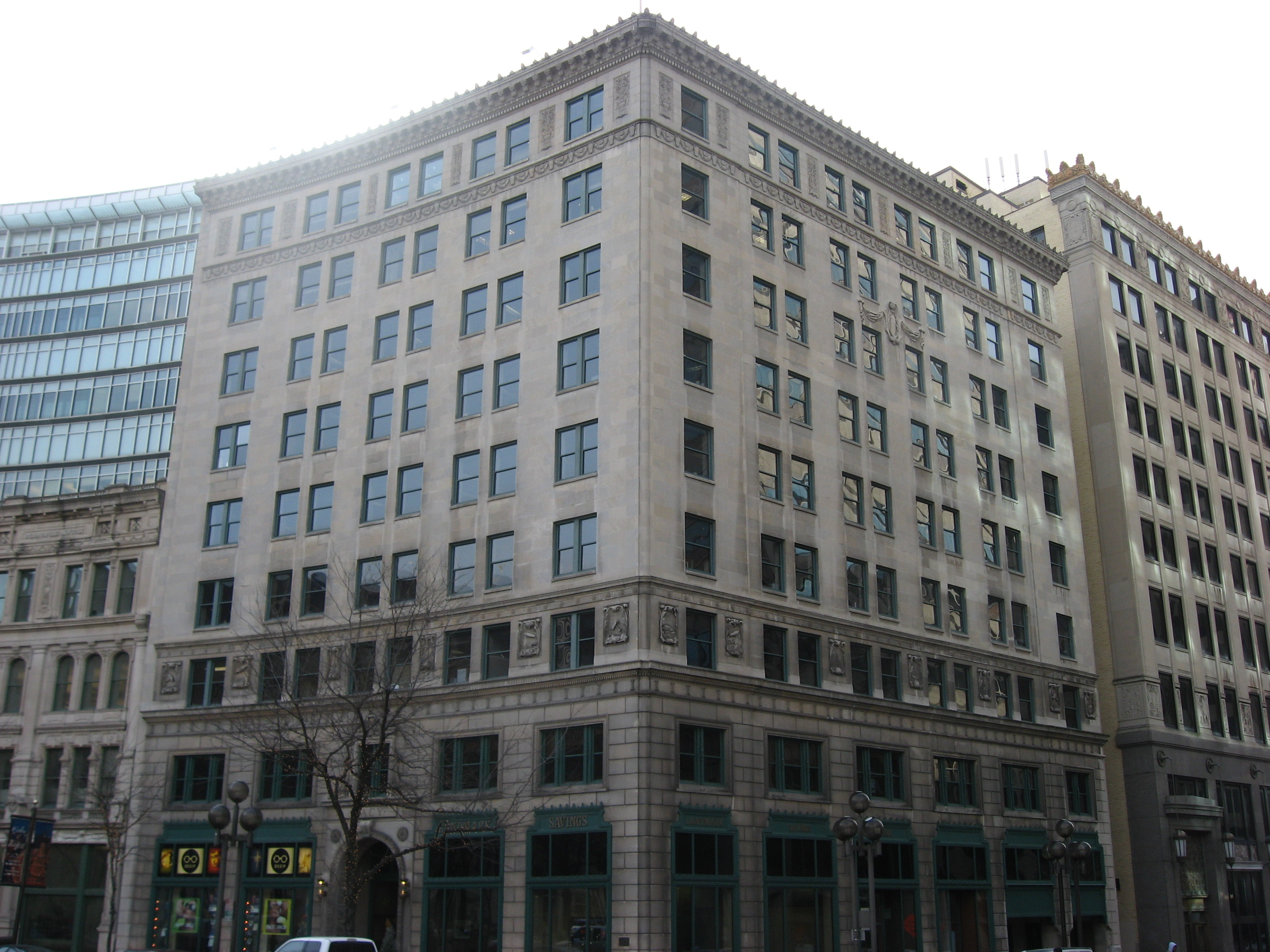
- Test Building, January 2010

- Location within Indianapolis Location within Indianapolis Location within Indiana Location within the United States
- Location: 54 Monument Circle, Indianapolis, Indiana
- Coordinates: 39°46′6″N 86°9′32″W
- Area: less than one acre
- Built: 1925
- Architect: Bass, Knowlton, & Company
- Part of: Washington Street–Monument Circle Historic District (ID97001179)
- NRHP reference No.: 83000138
- Added to NRHP: June 16, 1983

Test Building, also known as the Circle Motor Inn, is a historic commercial building in Indianapolis, Indiana. It was built in 1925, and is a nine-story, reinforced concrete structure with 12-inch-thick (30 cm) brick and clay tile curtain walls. It is faced with Indiana limestone and has a three-story brick penthouse and two-level basement. The mixed-use building housed the city's earliest large parking garages.

It was listed on the National Register of Historic Places in 1983. It is in the Washington Street-Monument Circle Historic District.

== History ==
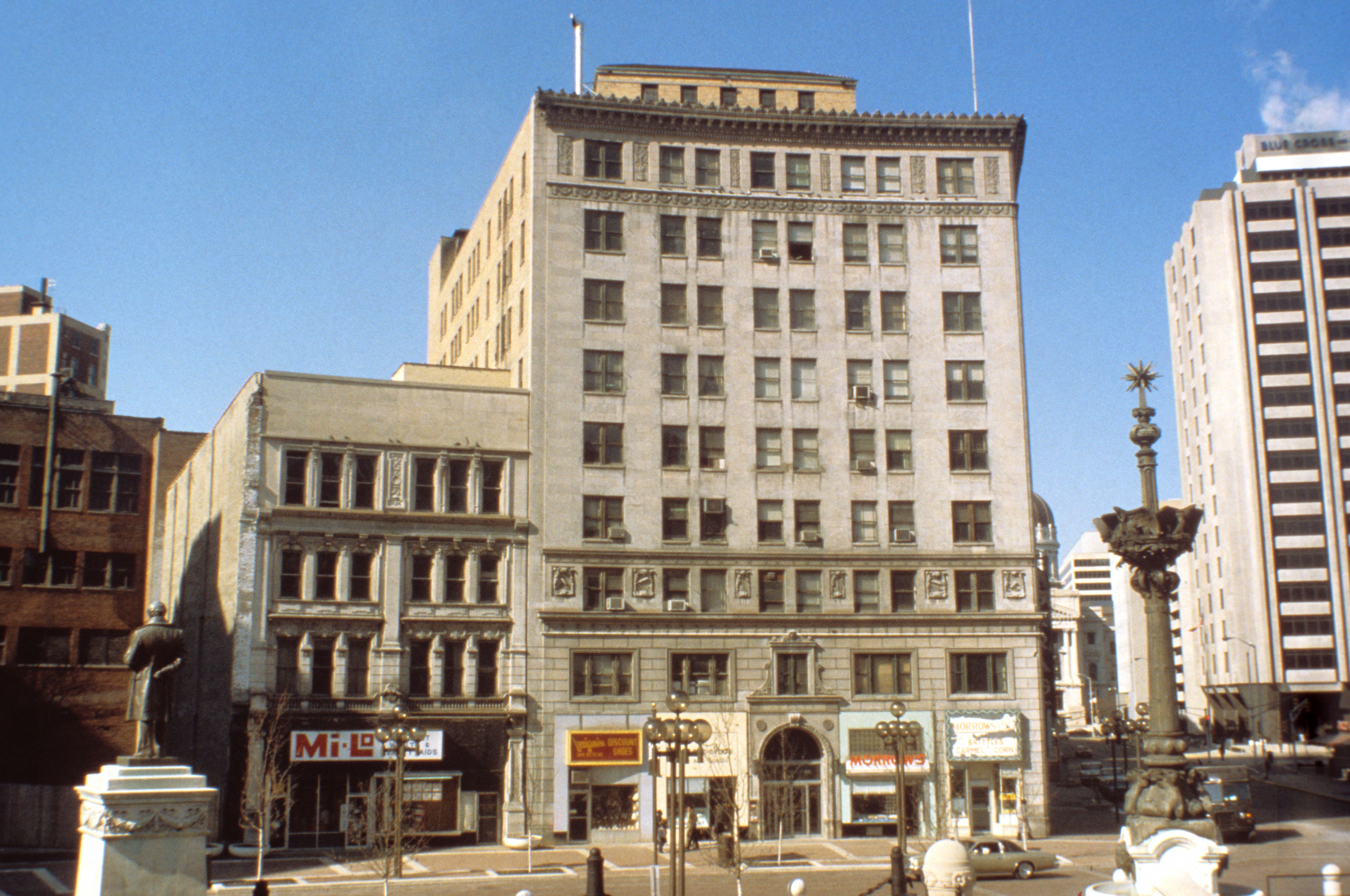
Journal Building and Test Building and 46-54 Monument Circle in 1979

The building was constructed in 1925. It was initially planned to be entirely a parking garage apart from ground-level stores, but met with controversy due to perceived danger to pedestrians and traffic congestion.

It was listed on the National Register of Historic Places in 1983.

== Description ==
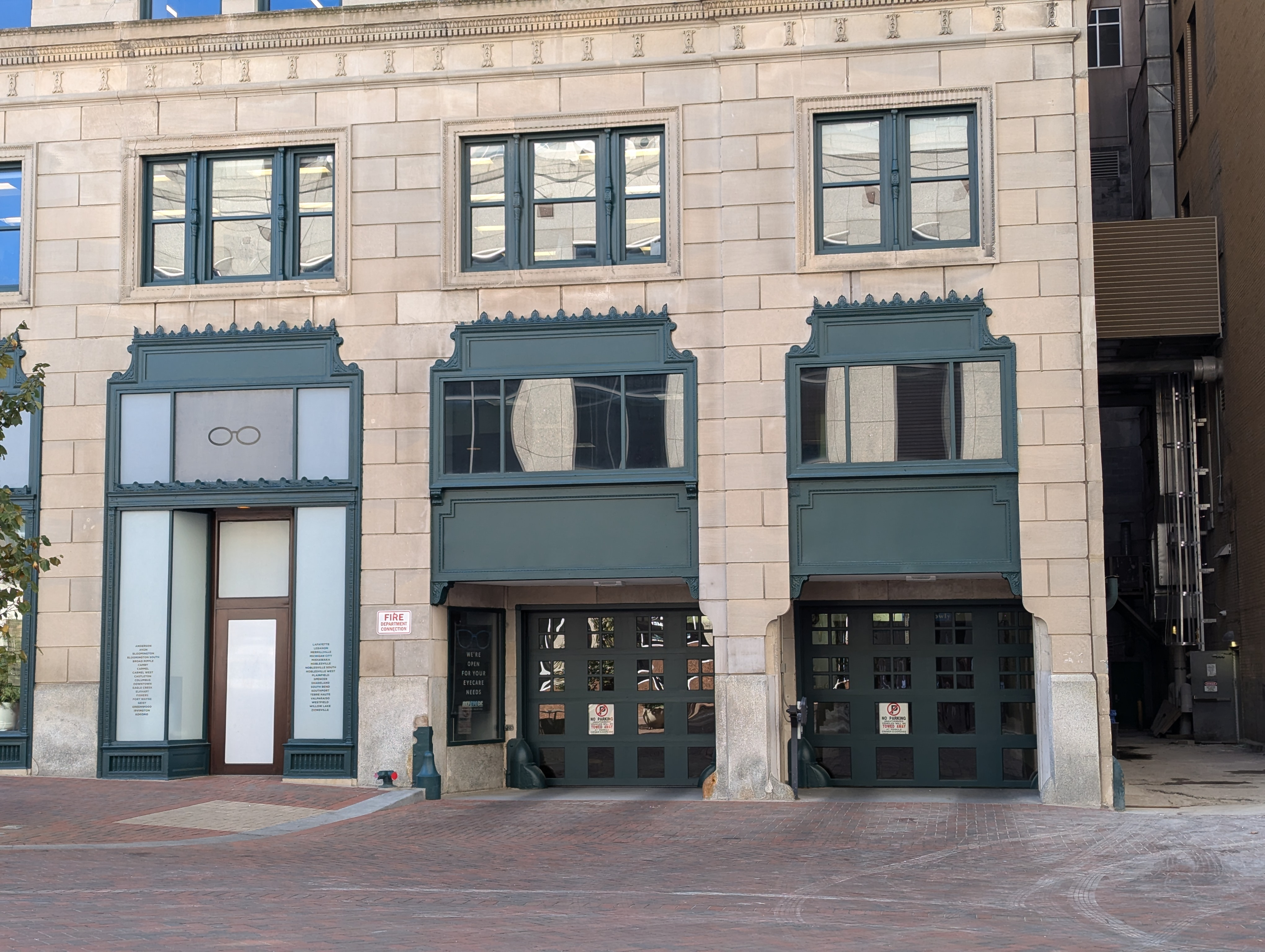
Entrance to the parking garage

The building is a nine-story, reinforced concrete structure with 12-inch-thick (30 cm) brick and clay tile curtain walls. It is faced with Indiana limestone and has a three-story brick penthouse and two-level basement. It was built in the Neoclassical Revival style by Bass, Knowlton & Company.

== See also ==
- National Register of Historic Places listings in Center Township, Marion County, Indiana
