= Skiles Test Nature Park =

Municipal park in Indianapolis, Indiana, US

Coordinates: 39°52′10″N 86°03′00″W

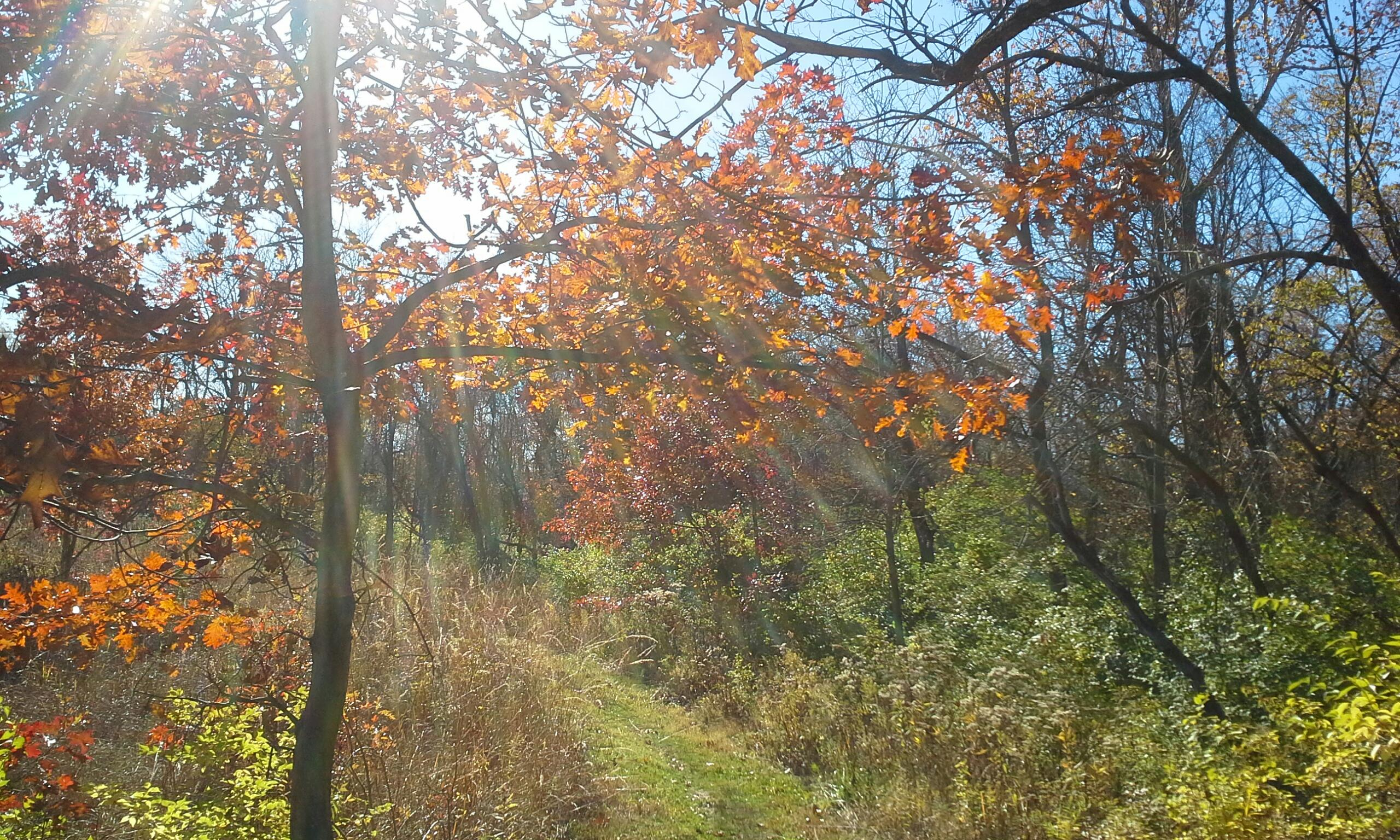
Skiles Test Nature Park in October 2014

Skiles Test Nature Park, sometimes called Skiles Test Nature Area, is a nature park on the northeast side of Indianapolis, Indiana, United States. It is in the northern trailhead of the Fall Creek Parkway and used by hikers, bikers and nature enthusiasts. The land, originally owned by millionaire Skiles Test, was willed to Indianapolis after his death. His home, known as the House of Blue Lights, is supposedly a haunted house.

Test lived on the property from 1913 to 1964. It once featured a miniature railway and a pool with bathhouses, elevators, and high dives.

In 2010 Big Car organized series of site specific art installations in the park including works by Cindy Hinant, Nathan Monk, and Lukas Schooler.

Skiles Test Nature Park has a documented history as a gay cruising site, but a crackdown and several arrests in the early 2000s led to a decline in it being used for this purpose.

== See also ==
- List of parks in Indianapolis
