= 1969–70 NCAA University Division men's basketball season =

Men's collegiate basketball season

- Preseason AP No. 1: South Carolina Gamecocks
- NCAA Tournament: 1970
- Tournament dates: March 7 – 21, 1970
- National Championship: Cole Field House; College Park, Maryland
- NCAA Champions: UCLA Bruins
- Helms National Champions: UCLA Bruins
- Other champions: Marquette Warriors (NIT)
- Player of the Year (Naismith, Wooden): Pete Maravich, LSU Tigers (Naismith)
- Player of the Year (Helms): Pete Maravich, LSU Tigers

The 1969–70 NCAA University Division men's basketball season began in December 1969, progressed through the regular season and conference tournaments, and concluded with the 1970 NCAA University Division basketball tournament championship game on March 21, 1970, at Cole Field House in College Park, Maryland. The UCLA Bruins won their sixth NCAA national championship with an 80–69 victory over the Jacksonville Dolphins.

== Season headlines ==
- UCLA won its fourth NCAA championship in a row, sixth overall, and sixth in seven seasons. In the Pacific 8 Conference, it also won its fourth of what ultimately would be 13 consecutive conference titles.
- The Pacific Coast Athletic Association began play. It was renamed the Big West Conference in 1988.
- LSU’s Pete Maravich established several NCAA records during his career. Two of the most notable came during this season — single-season scoring average (44.5 in 1969–70, besting his 44.2 average from the prior season) and career scoring (3,667 points). In addition to leading the NCAA in scoring for the third consecutive season, Maravich was named a consensus first-team All-American and SEC Player of the Year for the third time. He was the first player to score 3,000 or more points in his career (1968–1970), and his career average of 44.2 points per game made him the first player to average more than 40 points a game for his career. In a game against Alabama on February 7, 1970, Maravich scored 69 points, setting a record for points scored by a single player in a game against an NCAA University Division (later NCAA Division I) opponent; Maravich broke the record of 68 points set by Calvin Murphy of Niagara in December 1968, and no one outscored Maravich until Kevin Bradshaw scored 72 points in a game in January 1991.

== Season outlook ==
=== Pre-season polls ===
The Top 20 from the AP Poll and Coaches Poll during the pre-season.

Associated Press
Ranking	Team
1	South Carolina
2	Kentucky
3	Purdue
4	UCLA
5	Davidson
6	New Mexico State
7	North Carolina
8	Marquette
9	Villanova
10	Colorado
11	Duquesne
12	Santa Clara
13	Notre Dame
14	St. John's
15	Louisville
16	USC
17	St. Bonaventure
18	Ohio State
19	Drake
20	Houston

UPI Coaches
Ranking	Team
1	UCLA
2	South Carolina
3	Kentucky
4	Purdue
5	New Mexico State
6	Colorado
7	North Carolina
8	Davidson
9	USC
10	Duquesne
11	Santa Clara
12	Kansas
13	Marquette
14	St. John's
15	Villanova
16	St. Bonaventure
17 (tie)	Arizona
17 (tie)	New Mexico
19	Louisville
20	La Salle

== Conference membership changes ==
School	Former conference	New conference
Cal State Los Angeles Golden Eagles	non-University Division	Pacific Coast Athletic Association
Colorado State Rams	NCAA University Division independent	Western Athletic Conference
Fairleigh Dickinson Knights	Metropolitan Collegiate Conference	NCAA University Division independent
Fresno Bulldogs	non-University Division	Pacific Coast Athletic Association
Hofstra Flying Dutchmen	Metropolitan Collegiate Conference	Middle Atlantic Conference
Iona Gaels	Metropolitan Collegiate Conference	NCAA University Division independent
Long Beach State 49ers	non-University Division	Pacific Coast Athletic Association
Long Island Blackbirds	Metropolitan Collegiate Conference	NCAA University Division independent
Manhattan Jaspers	Metropolitan Collegiate Conference	NCAA University Division independent
Marshall Thundering Herd	Mid-American Conference	NCAA University Division independent
Nevada Wolfpack	non-University Division	West Coast Athletic Conference
UNLV Runnin' Rebels	non-University Division	West Coast Athletic Conference
Saint Peter's Peacocks	Metropolitan Collegiate Conference	NCAA University Division independent
San Diego State Aztecs	non-University Division	Pacific Coast Athletic Association
San Jose State Spartans	West Coast Athletic Conference	Pacific Coast Athletic Association
UC Santa Barbara Gauchos	West Coast Athletic Conference	Pacific Coast Athletic Association
Seton Hall Pirates	Metropolitan Collegiate Conference	NCAA University Division independent
UTEP Miners	NCAA University Division independent	Western Athletic Conference
Wagner Seahawks	Metropolitan Collegiate Conference	non-NCAA University Division

== Regular season ==
=== Conferences ===
==== Conference winners and tournaments ====
Conference	Regular season winner	Conference player of the year	Conference tournament	Tournament venue (City)	Tournament winner
Atlantic Coast Conference	South Carolina	John Roche, South Carolina	1970 ACC men's basketball tournament	Charlotte Coliseum (Charlotte, North Carolina)	NC State
Big Eight Conference	Kansas State	Dave Robisch, Kansas	No Tournament		
Big Sky Conference	Weber State	None selected	No Tournament		
Big Ten Conference	Iowa	None selected	No Tournament		
Ivy League	Penn	None selected	No Tournament		
Mid-American Conference	Ohio	Jim Penix, Bowling Green	No Tournament		
Middle Atlantic Conference	St. Joseph's (East); Lafayette, Lehigh, & Rider (West)		No Tournament		
Missouri Valley Conference	Drake	Jim Ard, Cincinnati	No Tournament		
Ohio Valley Conference	Western Kentucky	Jim McDaniels, Western Kentucky	No Tournament		
Pacific 8 Conference	UCLA	None selected	No Tournament		
Pacific Coast Athletic Association	Long Beach State	George Trapp, Long Beach State	No Tournament		
Southeastern Conference	Kentucky	Pete Maravich, LSU	No Tournament		
Southern Conference	Davidson	Mike Maloy, Davidson	1970 Southern Conference men's basketball tournament	Charlotte Coliseum (Charlotte, North Carolina)	Davidson
Southland Conference	Lamar	Kenny Haynes, Lamar	No Tournament		
Southwest Conference	Rice	Gene Phillips, SMU	No Tournament		
West Coast Athletic Conference	Santa Clara	Dennis Awtrey, Santa Clara	No Tournament		
Western Athletic Conference	UTEP	None selected	No Tournament		
Yankee Conference	Connecticut & Massachusetts	None selected	No Tournament		

==== Conference standings ====
1969–70 ACC men's basketball standings
	Conf.				Overall
Team	W		L	PCT	W		L	PCT
No. 6 South Carolina	14	–	0	1.000	25	–	3	.893
North Carolina	9	–	5	.643	18	–	9	.667
No. 10 NC State †	9	–	5	.643	23	–	7	.767
Duke	8	–	6	.571	17	–	9	.654
Wake Forest	6	–	8	.429	14	–	13	.519
Maryland	5	–	9	.357	13	–	13	.500
Virginia	3	–	11	.214	10	–	15	.400
Clemson	2	–	12	.143	7	–	19	.269
† 1970 ACC tournament winner Rankings from AP Poll

1969–70 Big Eight Conference men's basketball standings
	Conf.				Overall
Team	W		L	PCT	W		L	PCT
Kansas State	10	–	4	.714	20	–	8	.714
Kansas	8	–	6	.571	17	–	9	.654
Oklahoma	7	–	7	.500	19	–	9	.679
Nebraska	7	–	7	.500	16	–	9	.640
Missouri	7	–	7	.500	15	–	11	.577
Colorado	7	–	7	.500	14	–	12	.538
Oklahoma State	5	–	9	.357	14	–	12	.538
Iowa State	5	–	9	.357	12	–	14	.462
Rankings from AP Poll

1969–70 Big Sky men's basketball standings
	Conf.				Overall
Team	W		L	PCT	W		L	PCT
Weber State	12	–	3	.800	19	–	8	.704
Idaho State	11	–	4	.733	14	–	11	.560
Gonzaga	7	–	8	.467	10	–	16	.385
Idaho	6	–	9	.400	10	–	15	.400
Montana	5	–	10	.333	8	–	18	.308
Montana State	4	–	11	.267	4	–	22	.154

1969–70 Big Ten Conference men's basketball standings
	Conf.				Overall
Team	W		L	PCT	W		L	PCT
No. 7 Iowa	14	–	0	1.000	20	–	5	.800
Purdue	11	–	3	.786	18	–	6	.750
Ohio State	8	–	6	.571	15	–	9	.625
Illinois	8	–	6	.571	15	–	9	.625
Minnesota	7	–	7	.500	13	–	11	.542
Michigan	5	–	9	.357	10	–	14	.417
Wisconsin	5	–	9	.357	10	–	14	.417
Michigan State	5	–	9	.357	9	–	15	.375
Northwestern	4	–	10	.286	9	–	15	.375
Indiana	3	–	11	.214	7	–	17	.292
Rankings from AP Poll

1969–70 Ivy League men's basketball standings
	Conf.				Overall
Team	W		L	PCT	W		L	PCT
No. 13 Pennsylvania	14	–	0	1.000	25	–	2	.926
Columbia	11	–	3	.786	20	–	5	.800
Princeton	9	–	5	.643	16	–	9	.640
Dartmouth	7	–	7	.500	13	–	12	.520
Yale	7	–	7	.500	11	–	13	.458
Cornell	4	–	10	.286	7	–	16	.304
Brown	3	–	11	.214	6	–	20	.231
Harvard	1	–	13	.071	7	–	19	.269
Rankings from AP Poll

1969–70 Mid-American Conference men's basketball standings
	Conf.				Overall
Team	W		L	PCT	W		L	PCT
Ohio	9	–	1	.900	20	–	5	.800
Bowling Green State	7	–	3	.700	15	–	9	.625
Miami (Ohio)	6	–	4	.600	15	–	9	.625
Toledo	5	–	5	.500	15	–	9	.625
Kent State	2	–	8	.200	7	–	17	.292
Western Michigan	1	–	9	.100	5	–	18	.217
Rankings from AP Poll

1969–70 MAC men's basketball standings
	Conf.				Overall
Team	W		L	PCT	W		L	PCT
University–Eastern
Saint Joseph's	5	–	0	1.000	15	–	12	.556
La Salle	3	–	2	.600	14	–	12	.538
Temple †	2	–	3	.400	15	–	13	.536
Hofstra	2	–	3	.400	13	–	13	.500
American	2	–	3	.400	11	–	12	.478
West Chester	1	–	4	.200	11	–	15	.423
University–Western
Lehigh	7	–	3	.700	13	–	14	.481
Lafayette	7	–	3	.700	12	–	14	.462
Rider	7	–	3	.700	16	–	10	.615
Delaware	6	–	4	.600	16	–	9	.640
Bucknell	3	–	7	.300	6	–	17	.261
Gettysburg	0	–	10	.000	8	–	18	.308
College–Northern
Philadelphia Textile †		–		–		–		–
Scranton	10	–	4	.714	15	–	8	.652
Upsala		–		–		–		–
Juniata	8	–	4	.667	14	–	8	.636
Wagner	6	–	5	.545	11	–	14	.440
Elizabethtown	7	–	6	.538	9	–	13	.409
Susquehanna	8	–	8	.500	12	–	11	.522
Albright	7	–	10	.412	7	–	18	.280
Lycoming	3	–	12	.200	4	–	15	.211
College–Southern
Muhlenberg †	13	–	1	.929	16	–	6	.727
Pennsylvania Military		–		–		–		–
Johns Hopkins	8	–	4	.667	10	–	8	.556
Dickinson	11	–	6	.647	13	–	11	.542
Drexel	7	–	6	.538	11	–	11	.500
Ursinus	8	–	8	.500	9	–	9	.500
Swarthmore	7	–	7	.500	10	–	8	.556
Lebanon Valley	6	–	11	.353	7	–	13	.350
Moravian	4	–	16	.200	4	–	17	.190
Franklin & Marshall	3	–	12	.200	3	–	17	.150
Haverford	2	–	12	.143	5	–	14	.263
† 1970 MAC men's basketball tournament winner University division only counted games within their division. College division counted games across Northern/Southern. Rankings from AP Poll

1969–70 Missouri Valley Conference men's basketball standings
	Conf.				Overall
Team	W		L	PCT	W		L	PCT
No. 14 Drake	14	–	2	.875	22	–	7	.759
Cincinnati	12	–	4	.750	21	–	6	.778
North Texas State	11	–	5	.688	18	–	8	.692
Louisville	11	–	5	.688	18	–	9	.667
Tulsa	9	–	8	.529	15	–	11	.577
Bradley	7	–	9	.438	14	–	12	.538
Saint Louis	5	–	11	.313	9	–	17	.346
Wichita State	3	–	13	.188	8	–	18	.308
Memphis State	1	–	16	.059	6	–	20	.231
Rankings from AP Poll

1969–70 Ohio Valley Conference men's basketball standings
	Conf.				Overall
Team	W		L	PCT	W		L	PCT
No. 18 Western Kentucky	14	–	0	1.000	22	–	3	.880
Murray State	9	–	5	.643	17	–	9	.654
East Tennessee State	8	–	6	.571	15	–	11	.577
Eastern Kentucky	8	–	6	.571	12	–	10	.545
Middle Tennessee	6	–	8	.429	15	–	11	.577
Morehead State	5	–	9	.357	13	–	11	.542
Tennessee Tech	4	–	10	.286	10	–	15	.400
Austin Peay	2	–	12	.143	5	–	21	.192
Rankings from AP Poll

1969–70 Pacific–8 Conference men's basketball standings
	Conf.				Overall
Team	W		L	PCT	W		L	PCT
No. 2 UCLA	12	–	2	.857	28	–	2	.933
Washington State	9	–	5	.643	19	–	7	.731
No. 20 USC	9	–	5	.643	18	–	8	.692
Oregon	8	–	6	.571	17	–	9	.654
Washington	7	–	7	.500	17	–	9	.654
California	5	–	9	.357	11	–	15	.423
Oregon State	4	–	10	.286	10	–	16	.385
Stanford	2	–	12	.143	5	–	20	.200
Rankings from AP Poll

1969–70 Pacific Coast Athletic Association men's basketball standings
	Conf.				Overall
Team	W		L	PCT	W		L	PCT
No. 19 Long Beach State†	10	–	0	1.000	24	–	5	.828
UC Santa Barbara	6	–	4	.600	12	–	14	.462
Cal State Los Angeles*		–		–	18	–	8	.692
Fresno State*		–		–	14	–	12	.538
San Diego State*		–		–	13	–	13	.500
San Jose State	0	–	10	.000	3	–	21	.125
† Regular-season championship winner * – Played as non-major program Rankings from AP Poll

1969–70 Southeastern Conference men's basketball standings
	Conf.				Overall
Team	W		L	PCT	W		L	PCT
No. 1 Kentucky	17	–	1	.944	26	–	2	.929
LSU	13	–	5	.722	22	–	10	.688
Auburn	11	–	7	.611	15	–	11	.577
Georgia	11	–	7	.611	13	–	12	.520
Tennessee	10	–	8	.556	16	–	9	.640
Vanderbilt	8	–	10	.444	12	–	14	.462
Ole Miss	6	–	12	.333	10	–	15	.400
Florida	6	–	12	.333	9	–	17	.346
Alabama	5	–	13	.278	8	–	18	.308
Mississippi State	3	–	15	.167	6	–	18	.250
Rankings from AP Poll

1969–70 Southern Conference men's basketball standings
	Conf.				Overall
Team	W		L	PCT	W		L	PCT
No. 15 Davidson †	10	–	0	1.000	22	–	5	.815
East Carolina	9	–	2	.818	16	–	10	.615
George Washington	6	–	4	.600	12	–	15	.444
Furman	5	–	6	.455	13	–	13	.500
William & Mary	5	–	7	.417	11	–	16	.407
The Citadel	4	–	8	.333	8	–	16	.333
Richmond	4	–	9	.308	9	–	18	.333
VMI	3	–	10	.231	6	–	19	.240
† Tournament winner As of April 30, 1970; Rankings from AP Poll

1969–70 Southland Conference men's basketball standings
	Conf.				Overall
Team	W		L	PCT	W		L	PCT
Lamar	7	–	1	.875	15	–	9	.625
Texas-Arlington	4	–	4	.500	8	–	16	.333
Trinity (Tex.)*		–		–	15	–	8	.652
Arkansas State*		–		–	14	–	9	.609
Abilene Christian*		–		–	10	–	16	.385
* – Played as non-major program Rankings from AP poll

1969–70 Southwest Conference men's basketball standings
	Conf.				Overall
Team	W		L	PCT	W		L	PCT
Rice	10	–	4	.714	14	–	11	.560
Texas A&M	9	–	5	.643	14	–	10	.583
Baylor	8	–	6	.571	15	–	9	.625
Texas Tech	8	–	6	.571	14	–	10	.583
TCU	8	–	6	.571	10	–	14	.417
Texas	6	–	8	.429	11	–	13	.458
SMU	4	–	10	.286	5	–	19	.208
Arkansas	3	–	11	.214	5	–	19	.208
Rankings from AP Poll

1969–70 West Coast Athletic Conference men's basketball standings
	Conf.				Overall
Team	W		L	PCT	W		L	PCT
Santa Clara†	11	–	3	.786	23	–	6	.793
Pacific	11	–	3	.786	21	–	6	.778
UNLV	9	–	5	.643	17	–	9	.654
San Francisco	9	–	5	.643	15	–	11	.577
Pepperdine	7	–	7	.500	14	–	12	.538
Loyola (Calif.)	7	–	7	.500	13	–	13	.500
Nevada	2	–	12	.143	5	–	17	.227
Saint Mary's	0	–	14	.000	3	–	22	.120
† Regular-season championship winner Rankings from AP poll

1969–70 WAC men's basketball standings
	Conf.				Overall
Team	W		L	PCT	W		L	PCT
UTEP	10	–	4	.714	17	–	8	.680
Wyoming	9	–	5	.643	19	–	7	.731
Utah	9	–	5	.643	18	–	10	.643
Arizona	8	–	6	.571	12	–	14	.462
Colorado State	7	–	7	.500	14	–	9	.609
New Mexico	7	–	7	.500	13	–	13	.500
BYU	4	–	10	.286	8	–	18	.308
Arizona State	2	–	12	.143	4	–	22	.154
Rankings from AP Poll

1969–70 Yankee Conference men's basketball standings
	Conf.				Overall
Team	W		L	PCT	W		L	PCT
Massachusetts	8	–	2	.800	18	–	7	.720
Connecticut	8	–	2	.800	14	–	9	.609
Rhode Island	7	–	3	.700	16	–	10	.615
New Hampshire	3	–	7	.300	12	–	11	.522
Vermont	3	–	7	.300	8	–	16	.333
Maine	1	–	9	.100	7	–	17	.292

=== University Division independents ===
A total of 61 college teams played as University Division independents. Among them, Jacksonville (27–2) had the best winning percentage (.931), and Jacksonville and New Mexico State (27–3) finished with the most wins.

1969–70 NCAA University Division men's basketball independents standings
	Conf.				Overall
Team	W		L	PCT	W		L	PCT
No. 4 Jacksonville		–		–	27	–	2	.931
No. 5 New Mexico State		–		–	27	–	3	.900
No. 8 Marquette		–		–	26	–	3	.897
No. 3 St. Bonaventure		–		–	25	–	3	.893
No. 11 Florida State		–		–	23	–	3	.885
No. 12 Houston		–		–	25	–	5	.833
Army		–		–	22	–	6	.786
No. 17 Niagara		–		–	22	–	7	.759
No. 16 Utah State		–		–	22	–	7	.759
Villanova		–		–	22	–	7	.759
No. 9 Notre Dame		–		–	21	–	8	.724
St. John's		–		–	21	–	8	.724
Georgetown		–		–	18	–	7	.720
Duquesne		–		–	17	–	7	.708
Dayton		–		–	19	–	8	.704
Manhattan		–		–	18	–	8	.692
Hardin–Simmons		–		–	17	–	9	.654
Holy Cross		–		–	16	–	9	.640
Long Island		–		–	16	–	9	.640
Georgia Tech		–		–	17	–	10	.630
Creighton		–		–	15	–	10	.600
Seattle		–		–	15	–	10	.600
Boston University		–		–	14	–	10	.583
Butler		–		–	15	–	11	.577
Oklahoma City		–		–	17	–	13	.567
Fairleigh Dickinson		–		–	13	–	10	.565
Southern Illinois		–		–	13	–	10	.565
Colgate		–		–	14	–	11	.560
Providence		–		–	14	–	11	.560
Denver		–		–	13	–	11	.542
Loyola (IL)		–		–	13	–	11	.542
Penn State		–		–	13	–	11	.542
Rutgers		–		–	13	–	11	.542
Saint Peter's		–		–	13	–	11	.542
Northern Illinois		–		–	13	–	12	.520
Air Force		–		–	12	–	12	.500
Fairfield		–		–	12	–	12	.500
Iona		–		–	12	–	12	.500
NYU		–		–	12	–	12	.500
Pittsburgh		–		–	12	–	12	.500
Saint Francis (PA)		–		–	12	–	12	.500
Syracuse		–		–	12	–	12	.500
DePaul		–		–	12	–	13	.480
West Texas State		–		–	12	–	13	.480
Loyola (LA)		–		–	12	–	14	.462
Boston College		–		–	11	–	13	.458
Virginia Tech		–		–	10	–	12	.455
St. Francis (NY)		–		–	9	–	12	.429
West Virginia		–		–	11	–	15	.423
Canisius		–		–	9	–	13	.409
Fordham		–		–	10	–	15	.400
Seton Hall		–		–	10	–	15	.400
Marshall		–		–	9	–	14	.391
Miami (FL)		–		–	9	–	17	.346
Centenary		–		–	8	–	16	.333
Pan American		–		–	8	–	16	.333
Detroit		–		–	7	–	18	.280
Tulane		–		–	5	–	18	.217
Xavier		–		–	5	–	20	.200
Navy		–		–	4	–	19	.174
Portland		–		–	4	–	22	.154
Rankings from AP Poll

=== Informal championships ===
Conference	Regular season winner	Most Valuable Player
Philadelphia Big 5	Penn	Ken Durrett, La Salle

Penn finished with a 4–0 record in head-to-head competition among the Philadelphia Big 5.

== Post-season tournaments ==
=== NCAA tournament ===
==== Final Four ====
National semifinals
E	St. Bonaventure	83
ME	Jacksonville	91
MW	New Mexico State	77
W	UCLA	93

National finals
ME	Jacksonville	69
W	UCLA	80
Third place
E	St. Bonaventure	73
MW	New Mexico State	79

=== National Invitation tournament ===
==== Semifinals & finals ====
Semifinals
Army	59
St. John's	60
Marquette	101
LSU	79

Finals
St. John's	53
Marquette	65
Third place
Army	75
LSU	68

== Awards ==
=== Consensus All-American teams ===
Consensus First Team
Player	Position	Class	Team
Dan Issel	F/C	Senior	Kentucky
Bob Lanier	C	Senior	St. Bonaventure
Pete Maravich	G/F	Senior	Louisiana State
Rick Mount	G/F	Senior	Purdue
Calvin Murphy	G	Senior	Niagara

Consensus Second Team
Player	Position	Class	Team
Austin Carr	G	Junior	Notre Dame
Jim Collins	G	Senior	New Mexico State
John Roche	G	Junior	South Carolina
Charlie Scott	F	Senior	North Carolina
Sidney Wicks	F	Junior	UCLA

=== Major player of the year awards ===
- Naismith Award: Pete Maravich, LSU
- Helms Player of the Year: Pete Maravich, LSU
- Associated Press Player of the Year: Pete Maravich, LSU
- UPI Player of the Year: Pete Maravich, LSU
- Oscar Robertson Trophy (USBWA): Pete Maravich, LSU
- Sporting News Player of the Year: Pete Maravich, LSU

=== Major coach of the year awards ===
- Associated Press Coach of the Year: John Wooden, UCLA
- Henry Iba Award (USBWA): John Wooden, UCLA
- NABC Coach of the Year: John Wooden, UCLA
- UPI Coach of the Year: John Wooden, UCLA
- Sporting News Coach of the Year: Adolph Rupp, Kentucky

=== Other major awards ===
- Frances Pomeroy Naismith Award (Best player under 6'0): John Rinka, Kenyon
- Robert V. Geasey Trophy (Top player in Philadelphia Big 5): Ken Durrett, La Salle
- NIT/Haggerty Award (Top player in New York City metro area): Jim McMillian, Columbia

== Coaching changes ==
A number of teams changed coaches during the season and after it ended.

Team	Former Coach	Interim Coach	New Coach	Reason
Arkansas	Duddy Waller		Lanny Van Eman	
Butler	Tony Hinkle		George Theofanis	
Clemson	Bobby Roberts		Tates Locke	
Denver	Stan Albeck		Jim Karabetsos	
Fairfield	Jim Lynam		Fred Barakat	
Fordham	Ed Conlin		Digger Phelps	
Furman	Frank Selvy		Joe Williams	
George Washington	Wayne Dobbs		Carl Stone	
Hardin–Simmons	Paul Lambert		Glen Whitis	Lambert left to coach Southern Illinois.
Iowa	Ralph Miller		Dick Schultz	
Jacksonville	Joe Williams		Tom Wasdin	Williams left to coach Furman.
Kansas State	Cotton Fitzsimmons		Jack Hartman	Fitzsimmons left to coach the Phoenix Suns.
La Salle	Tom Gola		Paul Westhead	
Memphis State	Moe Iba		Gene Bartow	
Miami (Ohio)	Tates Locke		Darrell Hedric	Locke left to coach Clemson.
Minnesota	Bill Fitch		George Harrison	
Mississippi State	Joe Dan Gold		Kermit Davis Sr.	
Montana	Bob Cope		Lou Rocheleau	
North Texas State	Dan Spika		Harry Miller	
Oklahoma State	Henry Iba		Sam Aubrey	
Oregon State	Paul Valenti		Ralph Miller	
Portland	Ernie Smith	Joe Etzel	Jack Avina	
Saint Mary's	Mike Cimino		Druce Hale	
San Francisco	Phil Vukicevich		Bob Baillard	
Santa Clara	Dick Garibaldi		Carroll Williams	
Seton Hall	Richie Regan		Bill Raftery	
St. John's	Lou Carnesecca		Frank Mulzoff	
Southern Illinois	Jack Hartman		Paul Lambert	Hartman left to coach Kansas State.
UNLV	Rolland Todd		John Bayer	
Western Michigan	Sonny Means		Eldon Miller	
