= 1969–70 LSU Tigers basketball team =

American college basketball season

1969–70 LSU Tigers basketball

National Invitation Tournament, Fourth Place
- Conference: Southeastern Conference
- Record: 22–10 (13–5 SEC)
- Head coach: Press Maravich (4th season)
- Home arena: John M. Parker Agricultural Coliseum

1969–70 Southeastern Conference men's basketball standings
	Conf.				Overall
Team	W		L	PCT	W		L	PCT
No. 1 Kentucky	17	–	1	.944	26	–	2	.929
LSU	13	–	5	.722	22	–	10	.688
Auburn	11	–	7	.611	15	–	11	.577
Georgia	11	–	7	.611	13	–	12	.520
Tennessee	10	–	8	.556	16	–	9	.640
Vanderbilt	8	–	10	.444	12	–	14	.462
Ole Miss	6	–	12	.333	10	–	15	.400
Florida	6	–	12	.333	9	–	17	.346
Alabama	5	–	13	.278	8	–	18	.308
Mississippi State	3	–	15	.167	6	–	18	.250
Rankings from AP Poll

The 1969–70 LSU Tigers basketball team represented Louisiana State University as a member of the Southeastern Conference during the 1969–70 NCAA University Division men's basketball season. The team's head coach was Press Maravich, in his fourth season at LSU. They played their home games at the John M. Parker Agricultural Coliseum in Baton Rouge, Louisiana. The Tigers finished the season 22–10, 13–5 in SEC play to finish in second place. LSU received an invitation to the National Invitation Tournament where they defeated Georgetown and Oklahoma before losing in to No. 8 Marquette in the semifinals.

== Roster ==
1969–70 LSU Tigers men's basketball team
Players
Coaches

Pos.	#	Name	Height	Weight	Year	Hometown
G		Jeff Tribbett	6 ft 0 in (1.83 m)	—	Sr	Lebanon, Indiana
G	23	Pete Maravich	6 ft 5 in (1.96 m)	190 lb (86 kg)	Sr	Aliquippa, Pennsylvania
G	24	Rich Hickman	6 ft 0 in (1.83 m)	—	Sr
F	31	Al Sanders	6 ft 7 in (2.01 m)	230 lb (104 kg)	So	Baton Rouge, Louisiana
C	35	Dan Hester	6 ft 8 in (2.03 m)	210 lb (95 kg)	Sr	Mount Vernon, Illinois
F		Bill Newton	6 ft 9 in (2.06 m)	215 lb (98 kg)	So	Rockville, Indiana

Head coach

- Press Maravich

Assistant coach(es)

Legend

- (C) Team captain
- (S) Suspended
- (I) Ineligible
- (W) Walk-on
- Injured
- Current redshirt

Roster

== Schedule and results ==
Date time, TV	Rank^{#}	Opponent^{#}	Result	Record	High points	High rebounds	High assists	Site city, state
Regular season
December 4*		Oregon State	W 94–72	1–0	43 – Maravich	–	–	John M. Parker Agricultural Coliseum; Baton Rouge, Louisiana
December 9*		Loyola (LA)	W 100–87	2–0	45 – Maravich	–	–	John M. Parker Agricultural Coliseum; Baton Rouge, Louisiana
December 11		Vanderbilt	W 109–86	3–0 (1–0)	61 – Maravich	–	–	John M. Parker Agricultural Coliseum; Baton Rouge, Louisiana
December 13*		at Tulane	W 97–91	4–0	46 – Maravich	–	–	Tulane Gymnasium; New Orleans, LA
December 18*	No. 15	No. 13 USC	L 98–101	4–1	50 – Maravich	–	–	John M. Parker Agricultural Coliseum; Baton Rouge, Louisiana
December 20*	No. 15	at Clemson	W 111–103	5–1	49 – Maravich	–	–	Littlejohn Coliseum; Clemson, SC
December 22*	No. 15	at Oregon State	W 78–68	6–1	46 – Maravich	–	–	Gill Coliseum; Corvallis, Oregon
December 23*		at No. 2 UCLA	L 84–133	6–2	38 – Maravich	–	–	Pauley Pavilion; Los Angeles, CA
December 29*		vs. St. John's; Rainbow Classic	W 80–70	7–2	53 – Maravich	–	–	Neil S. Blaisdell Arena; Honolulu, HI
December 30*		vs. Yale; Rainbow Classic	L 94–97	7–3	34 – Maravich	–	–	Neil S. Blaisdell Center; Honolulu, HI
January 3		Alabama	W 90–83	8–3 (2–0)	55 – Maravich	–	–	John M. Parker Agricultural Coliseum; Baton Rouge, Louisiana
January 10		Auburn	L 70–79	8–4 (2–1)	44 – Maravich	–	–	John M. Parker Agricultural Coliseum; Baton Rouge, Louisiana
January 24		at Kentucky	L 96–106	8–5 (2–2)	55 – Maravich	17 – Sanders	–	Memorial Coliseum; Lexington, Kentucky
January 26		Tennessee	W 71–59	9–5 (3–2)	29 – Maravich	–	–	John M. Parker Agricultural Coliseum; Baton Rouge, Louisiana
January 31		Ole Miss	W 109–86	10–5 (4–2)	53 – Maravich	–	–	John M. Parker Agricultural Coliseum; Baton Rouge, Louisiana
February 2		Mississippi State	W 109–91	11–5 (5–2)	49 – Maravich	–	–	John M. Parker Agricultural Coliseum; Baton Rouge, Louisiana
February 4		at Florida	W 95–75	12–5 (6–2)	52 – Maravich	–	–	Alligator Alley; Gainesville, Florida
February 7		at Alabama	L 104–106	12–6 (6–3)	69 – Maravich	–	–	Memorial Coliseum; Tuscaloosa, Alabama
February 9*		Tulane	W 127–114	13–6	49 – Maravich	–	–	John M. Parker Agricultural Coliseum; Baton Rouge, Louisiana
February 11		Florida	W 94–85	14–6 (7–3)	38 – Maravich	–	–	John M. Parker Agricultural Coliseum; Baton Rouge, Louisiana
February 14		at Vanderbilt	W 99–89	15–6 (8–3)	38 – Maravich	–	–	Memorial Gymnasium; Nashville, Tennessee
February 16		at Auburn	W 70–64	16–6 (9–3)	46 – Maravich	–	–	Beard Coliseum; Auburn, Alabama
Feb 18, 1970		Georgia	W 88–86	17–6 (10–3)	37 – Maravich	–	–	John Parker Memorial Coliseum; Baton Rouge, Louisiana
Feb 21, 1970		No. 2 Kentucky	L 105–121	17–7 (10–4)	64 – Maravich	10 – Hester	–	John Parker Memorial Coliseum; Baton Rouge, Louisiana
Feb 23, 1970		at Tennessee	L 87–88	17–8 (10–5)	30 – Maravich	–	–	Stokely Athletic Center; Knoxville, Tennessee
Feb 28, 1970		at Ole Miss	W 103–90	18–8 (11–5)	35 – Maravich	–	–	Rebel Coliseum; Oxford, Mississippi
Mar 2, 1970		at Mississippi State	W 97–87	19–8 (12–5)	55 – Maravich	–	–	McCarthy Gymnasium; Starkville, Mississippi
Mar 7, 1970		at Georgia	W 99–88	20–8 (13–5)	41 – Maravich	–	–	Georgia Coliseum; Athens, Georgia
National Invitation Tournament
Mar 15, 1970*		vs. Georgetown; First Round	W 83–82	21–8	30 – Hester	–	–	Madison Square Garden; New York, New York
Mar 17, 1970*		vs. Oklahoma; Quarterfinals	W 97–94	22–8	37 – Maravich	–	–	Madison Square Garden; New York, New York
Mar 19, 1970*		vs. No. 8 Marquette; Semifinals	L 79–101	22–9	24 – Hester	–	–	Madison Square Garden; New York, New York
Mar 21, 1970*		vs. Army; Third place game	L 69–75	22–10	21 – Hester	–	–	Madison Square Garden; New York, New York
*Non-conference game. ^{#}Rankings from AP Poll. (#) Tournament seedings in parentheses. All times are in Central Time.

== Awards and honors ==
- Pete Maravich – National Player of the Year, Consensus First-team All-American (3x), NCAA Scoring Leader (3x), SEC Player of the Year (3x), All-time single-season NCAA scoring average (44.5 ppg), All-time NCAA scoring leader (3,667 points)

== 1970 NBA draft ==
Round	Pick	Player	NBA club
1	3	Pete Maravich	Atlanta Hawks
2	31	Dan Hester	Atlanta Hawks
