= 1969–70 Kansas Jayhawks men's basketball team =

American college basketball season

1969–70 Kansas Jayhawks men's basketball
- Conference: Big Eight Conference
- Record: 17–9 (8–6 Big 8)
- Head coach: Ted Owens (6th season)
- Assistant coaches: Gale Catlett (3rd season); Sam Miranda (4th season)
- Captain: Chester Lawrence
- Home arena: Allen Fieldhouse

1969–70 Big Eight Conference men's basketball standings
	Conf.				Overall
Team	W		L	PCT	W		L	PCT
Kansas State	10	–	4	.714	20	–	8	.714
Kansas	8	–	6	.571	17	–	9	.654
Oklahoma	7	–	7	.500	19	–	9	.679
Nebraska	7	–	7	.500	16	–	9	.640
Missouri	7	–	7	.500	15	–	11	.577
Colorado	7	–	7	.500	14	–	12	.538
Oklahoma State	5	–	9	.357	14	–	12	.538
Iowa State	5	–	9	.357	12	–	14	.462
Rankings from AP Poll

The 1969–70 Kansas Jayhawks men's basketball team represented the University of Kansas during the 1969–70 college men's basketball season.

== Roster ==
- Dave Robisch
- Pierre Russell
- Bud Stallworth
- Bob Kivisto
- Roger Brown
- Aubrey Nash
- Chester Lawrence
- Fred Bosilevac Jr.
- Neal Mask
- Mark Mathews
- Tim Natsus

== Schedule ==
Date time, TV	Rank^{#}	Opponent^{#}	Result	Record	Site city, state
December 1*		Marshall	W 96–80	1-0	Allen Fieldhouse; Lawrence, KS
December 6*		at No. 2 Kentucky	L 85–115	1-1	Kentucky; Lexington, KY
December 8*		Wisconsin	W 76–60	2-1	Allen Fieldhouse; Lawrence, KS
December 13*		at Loyola (IL)	W 72–71	3-1	Alumni Gym; Chicago, IL
December 15*		at No. 10 Notre Dame	W 75–63	4-1	Joyce Center; Notre Dame, IN
December 19*		SMU	W 89–77	5-1	Allen Fieldhouse; Lawrence, KS
December 20*		Western Kentucky	W 104–81	6-1	Allen Fieldhouse; Lawrence, KS
December 26	No. 16	vs. Oklahoma	L 64–68 ^{OT}	6-2	Municipal Auditorium; Kansas City, MO
December 29	No. 16	vs. Oklahoma State	W 72–56	7-2	Municipal Auditorium; Kansas City, MO
December 30		vs. Nebraska	L 73–78	7-3	Municipal Auditorium; Kansas City, MO
January 5		at Missouri; Border War	L 53–56	7-4 (0-1)	Brewer Fieldhouse; Columbia, MO
January 10		Iowa State	W 82–62	8-4 (1-1)	Allen Fieldhouse; Lawrence, KS
January 17*		Murray State	W 64–62	9-4	Allen Fieldhouse; Lawrence, KS
January 24*		Valparaiso	W 74–58	10-4	Allen Fieldhouse; Lawrence, KS
January 26		at Iowa State	L 89–91	10-5 (1-2)	Iowa State Armory; Ames, IA
January 31		at Colorado	W 75–73	11-5 (2-2)	Allen Fieldhouse; Lawrence, KS
February 2		Oklahoma	W 78–41	12-5 (3-2)	Allen Fieldhouse; Lawrence, KS
February 7		at Nebraska	L 73–84	12-6 (3-3)	Nebraska Coliseum; Lincoln, NE
February 9		Oklahoma State	W 69–58	13-6 (4-3)	Allen Fieldhouse; Lawrence, KS
February 14		at Kansas State; Sunflower Showdown	L 68–71	13-7 (4-4)	Ahearn Field House; Manhattan, KS
February 17		Nebraska	W 100–87	14-7 (5-4)	Allen Fieldhouse; Lawrence, KS
February 21		Colorado	L 73–81	14-8 (5-5)	Balch Fieldhouse; Boulder, CO
February 23		Missouri; Border War	W 63–45	15-8 (6-5)	Allen Fieldhouse; Lawrence, KS
February 28		at Oklahoma State	W 78–58	16-8 (7-5)	Gallagher-Iba Arena; Stillwater, OK
March 2		at Oklahoma	L 77–82	16-9 (7-6)	McCasland Field House; Norman, OK
March 7	No. 16	Kansas State; Sunflower Showdown	W 82–79	17-9 (8-6)	Allen Fieldhouse; Lawrence, KS
*Non-conference game. ^{#}Rankings from AP Poll. (#) Tournament seedings in parentheses.
