= 1969–70 Kentucky Wildcats men's basketball team =

1969–70 season of University of Kentucky men's basketball team

1969–70 Kentucky Wildcats men's basketball

NCAA regular season champions SEC regular season champions

NCAA Men's Division I Tournament, Elite Eight
- Conference: Southeast Conference

Ranking
- Coaches: No. 1
- AP: No. 1
- Record: 26–2 (17–1 SEC)
- Head coach: Adolph Rupp (39th season)
- Assistant coaches: Joe B. Hall; Dick Parsons; T. L. Plain
- Home arena: Memorial Coliseum

1969–70 Southeastern Conference men's basketball standings
	Conf.				Overall
Team	W		L	PCT	W		L	PCT
No. 1 Kentucky	17	–	1	.944	26	–	2	.929
LSU	13	–	5	.722	22	–	10	.688
Auburn	11	–	7	.611	15	–	11	.577
Georgia	11	–	7	.611	13	–	12	.520
Tennessee	10	–	8	.556	16	–	9	.640
Vanderbilt	8	–	10	.444	12	–	14	.462
Ole Miss	6	–	12	.333	10	–	15	.400
Florida	6	–	12	.333	9	–	17	.346
Alabama	5	–	13	.278	8	–	18	.308
Mississippi State	3	–	15	.167	6	–	18	.250
Rankings from AP Poll

The 1969–70 Kentucky Wildcats men's basketball team represented University of Kentucky. The head coach was Adolph Rupp. The team was a member of the Southeast Conference and played their home games at Memorial Coliseum.

== Roster ==
1969–70 Kentucky Wildcats men's basketball team
Players
Coaches

Pos.	#	Name	Height	Weight	Year	Previous school	Hometown
G	14	Bill Busey	5 ft 10 in (1.78 m)	160 lb (73 kg)	Sr	Shelby County	Bagdad, KY
G	10	Jim Dinwiddie	6 ft 4 in (1.93 m)	175 lb (79 kg)	Jr	—	Leitchfield, KY
G	32	Kent Hollenbeck	6 ft 4 in (1.93 m)	190 lb (86 kg)	So	Bearden	Knoxville, TN
C	44	Dan Issel	6 ft 8 in (2.03 m)	240 lb (109 kg)	Sr	Batavia	Batavia, IL
G	30	Stan Key	6 ft 3 in (1.91 m)	186 lb (84 kg)	So	Calloway County	Hazel, KY
C	54	Art Laib	6 ft 10 in (2.08 m)	200 lb (91 kg)	Sr	Hammond	San Francisco, CA
G	11	Bob McGowan (S)	6 ft 2 in (1.88 m)	175 lb (79 kg)	Jr	Fairview	Dayton, OH
G	21	Terry Mills	6 ft 2 in (1.88 m)	188 lb (85 kg)	Jr	Knox Central	Barbourville, KY
F	50	Randy Noll	6 ft 7 in (2.01 m)	190 lb (86 kg)	So	Covington Catholic	Villa Hills, KY
F	12	Tom Parker	6 ft 6 in (1.98 m)	215 lb (98 kg)	So	Collinsville	Collinsville, IL
F	42	Randy Pool (S)	6 ft 7 in (2.01 m)	210 lb (95 kg)	Sr	Oak Ridge	Oak Ridge, TN
F	22	Mike Pratt	6 ft 4 in (1.93 m)	217 lb (98 kg)	Sr	Meadowdale	Dayton, OH
C	45	Mark Soderberg	6 ft 10 in (2.08 m)	225 lb (102 kg)	So	Marinas	Huntington Beach, CA
F	25	Larry Steele	6 ft 5 in (1.96 m)	185 lb (84 kg)	Jr	—	Bainbridge, IN
F	40	Clint Wheeler	6 ft 7 in (2.01 m)	208 lb (94 kg)	Jr	Blazer	Ashland, KY

Head coach

- Adolph Rupp

Assistant coach(es)

- Joe B. Hall
- Dick Parsons
- T.L. Plain

Legend

- (C) Team captain
- (S) Suspended
- (I) Ineligible
- (W) Walk-on
- Injured
- Current redshirt

Roster
Last update: 2016-Feb-03

== Schedule ==
Date time, TV	Rank^{#}	Opponent^{#}	Result	Record	Site city, state
Regular Season
December 1, 1969*	No. 2	West Virginia	W 106–87	1–0	Memorial Coliseum; Lexington, KY
December 6, 1969*	No. 2	Kansas	W 115–85	2–0	Memorial Coliseum; Lexington, KY
December 8, 1969*	No. 1	at No. 5 North Carolina	W 94–87	3–0	Charlotte Coliseum; Charlotte, NC
December 13, 1969*	No. 1	Indiana; Rivalry	W 109–92	4–0	Memorial Coliseum; Lexington, KY
December 19, 1969*	No. 1	Navy	W 73–59	5–0	Memorial Coliseum; Lexington, KY
December 20, 1969*	No. 1	Duke	W 98–76	6–0	Memorial Coliseum; Lexington, KY
December 27, 1969*	No. 1	vs. No. 11 Notre Dame	W 102–100	7–0	Freedom Hall; Louisville, KY
December 29, 1969*	No. 1	Miami (OH)	W 80–58	8–0	Memorial Coliseum; Lexington, KY
January 3, 1970	No. 1	Ole Miss	W 95–73	9–0 (1–0)	Memorial Coliseum; Lexington, KY
January 5, 1970	No. 2	Mississippi State	W 111–76	10–0 (2–0)	Memorial Coliseum; Lexington, KY
January 10, 1970	No. 2	at Florida	W 88–69	11–0 (3–0)	Florida Gymnasium; Gainesville, FL
January 12, 1970	No. 2	at Georgia	W 72–71	12–0 (4–0)	Georgia Coliseum; Athens, GA
January 17, 1970	No. 2	Tennessee; Rivalry	W 68–52	13–0 (5–0)	Memorial Coliseum; Lexington, KY
January 24, 1970	No. 2	LSU	W 109–96	14–0 (6–0)	Memorial Coliseum; Lexington, KY
January 26, 1970	No. 2	Alabama	W 86–71	15–0 (7–0)	Memorial Coliseum; Lexington, KY
January 31, 1970	No. 2	at Vanderbilt	L 81–89	15–1 (7–1)	Memorial Gymnasium; Nashville, TN
February 2, 1970	No. 3	at Auburn	W 84–83	16–1 (8–1)	Memorial Coliseum; Auburn, AL
February 7, 1970	No. 3	at Ole Miss	W 120–85	17–1 (9–1)	Rebel Coliseum; Oxford, MS
February 9, 1970	No. 3	at Mississippi State	W 86–57	18–1 (10–1)	McCarthy Gymnasium; Starkville, MS
February 14, 1970	No. 3	Florida; Rivalry	W 110–66	19–1 (11–1)	Memorial Coliseum; Lexington, KY
February 16, 1970	No. 2	Georgia	W 116–86	20–1 (12–1)	Memorial Coliseum; Lexington, KY
February 21, 1970	No. 2	at LSU	W 121–105	21–1 (13–1)	Parker Memorial Coliseum; Baton Rouge, LA
February 23, 1970	No. 1	at Alabama	W 98–89	22–1 (14–1)	Memorial Coliseum; Tuscaloosa, AL
February 28, 1970	No. 1	Vanderbilt	W 90–86	23–1 (15–1)	Memorial Coliseum; Lexington, KY
March 2, 1970	No. 2	Auburn	W 102–81	24–1 (16–1)	Memorial Coliseum; Lexington, KY
March 7, 1970	No. 2	Tennessee; Rivalry	W 86–69	25–1 (17–1)	Stokely Center; Knoxville, TN
NCAA Tournament
March 12, 1970*	No. 1	vs. No. 9 Notre Dame; Regional semifinal	W 109–99	26–1	St. John Arena; Columbus, OH
March 14, 1970*	No. 1	vs. No. 4 Jacksonville; Elite Eight	L 100–106	26–2	St. John Arena; Columbus, OH
*Non-conference game. ^{#}Rankings from AP Poll. (#) Tournament seedings in parentheses. All times are in Eastern time.

== Team players drafted into the NBA ==
Round	Pick	Player	NBA club
8	122	Dan Issel	Detroit Pistons
