= 1970 ACC men's basketball tournament =

- Classification: Division I
- Season: 1969–70
- Teams: 8
- Site: Charlotte Coliseum; Charlotte, North Carolina
- Champions: NC State (6th title)
- Winning coach: Norm Sloan (1st title)
- MVP: Vann Williford (NC State)

1969–70 ACC men's basketball standings
	Conf.				Overall
Team	W		L	PCT	W		L	PCT
No. 6 South Carolina	14	–	0	1.000	25	–	3	.893
North Carolina	9	–	5	.643	18	–	9	.667
No. 10 NC State †	9	–	5	.643	23	–	7	.767
Duke	8	–	6	.571	17	–	9	.654
Wake Forest	6	–	8	.429	14	–	13	.519
Maryland	5	–	9	.357	13	–	13	.500
Virginia	3	–	11	.214	10	–	15	.400
Clemson	2	–	12	.143	7	–	19	.269
† 1970 ACC tournament winner Rankings from AP Poll

The 1970 Atlantic Coast Conference men's basketball tournament was held in Charlotte, North Carolina, at the original Charlotte Coliseum from March 5–7, 1970. NC State defeated South Carolina, 42–39, in double overtime to win the championship. Vann Williford of NC State was named tournament MVP.

== Bracket ==
Quarterfinals; March 5
1	#3 South Carolina	34
8	Clemson	33
4	Duke	73
5	Wake Forest	81
2	North Carolina	93
7	Virginia	95
3	#19 NC State	67
6	Maryland	57

Semifinals; March 6
1	#3 South Carolina	79
5	Wake Forest	63
7	Virginia	66
3	#19 NC State	67

Championship Game; March 7
1	#3 South Carolina	39
3	#19 NC State	42^{2OT}
