= 1969–70 Iowa State Cyclones men's basketball team =

American college basketball season

1969–70 Iowa State Cyclones men's basketball
- Conference: Big Eight Conference
- Record: 12–14 (5–9 Big Eight)
- Head coach: Glen Anderson (11th season)
- Assistant coach: Arnie Gaarde
- Home arena: Iowa State Armory

1969–70 Big Eight Conference men's basketball standings
	Conf.				Overall
Team	W		L	PCT	W		L	PCT
Kansas State	10	–	4	.714	20	–	8	.714
Kansas	8	–	6	.571	17	–	9	.654
Oklahoma	7	–	7	.500	19	–	9	.679
Nebraska	7	–	7	.500	16	–	9	.640
Missouri	7	–	7	.500	15	–	11	.577
Colorado	7	–	7	.500	14	–	12	.538
Oklahoma State	5	–	9	.357	14	–	12	.538
Iowa State	5	–	9	.357	12	–	14	.462
Rankings from AP Poll

The 1969–70 Iowa State Cyclones men's basketball team represented Iowa State University during the 1969–70 NCAA University Division men's basketball season. The Cyclones were coached by Glen Anderson, who was in his eleventh season with the Cyclones. They played their home games at the Iowa State Armory in Ames, Iowa.

They finished the season 12–14, 5–9 in Big Eight play to finish in a tie for seventh place.

== Roster ==
1969–70 Iowa State Cyclones men's basketball team
Players
Coaches

Pos.	#	Name	Height	Weight	Year	Hometown
G		Jim Abrahamson (C)	6 ft 0 in (1.83 m)	—	Sr
C		Roger Ahrens	6 ft 11 in (2.11 m)	—
F		Bill Cain (C)	6 ft 7 in (2.01 m)	—	Sr
F		Dave Collins	6 ft 2 in (1.88 m)	—	Sr
G		Jack DeVilder	6 ft 3 in (1.91 m)	—	Jr
F		Rick Engel	6 ft 4 in (1.93 m)	—	So
F		Aaron Jenkins	6 ft 3 in (1.91 m)	—
F		Ron Kaufman	6 ft 5 in (1.96 m)	—	Sr
G		Gene Mack	6 ft 1 in (1.85 m)	—	So
G		Jim Abrahamson	6 ft 0 in (1.83 m)	—	Sr
		Pat Melloy	—	—
G		Jim Miller	5 ft 9 in (1.75 m)	—	So
G		Mike Murray	6 ft 1 in (1.85 m)	—	Sr
		Bill Snell	6 ft 0 in (1.83 m)	—

Head coach

- Glen Anderson

Assistant coach(es)

Arnie Gaarde

Legend

- (C) Team captain
- (S) Suspended
- (I) Ineligible
- (W) Walk-on
- Injured
- Current redshirt

== Schedule and results ==
Date time, TV	Rank^{#}	Opponent^{#}	Result	Record	Site city, state
Regular season
December 1, 1969*; 7:35 pm		Washburn	W 75–49	1–0	Iowa State Armory; Ames, Iowa
December 4, 1969*; 7:35 pm		Sacramento State	W 77–61	2–0	Iowa State Armory; Ames, Iowa
December 6, 1969*; 7:35 pm		at No. 19 Drake	L 62–86	2–1	Veterans Memorial Auditorium; Des Moines, Iowa
December 9, 1969*; 7:35 pm		Minnesota	W 89–84 ^{OT}	3–1	Iowa State Armory; Ames, Iowa
December 12, 1969*; 9:05 pm		at Arizona	L 65–78	3–2	Bear Down Gym (3,600); Tucson, Arizona
December 13, 1969*; 10:00 pm		at No. 6 USC	L 59–70	3–3	L.A. Sports Arena; Los Angeles
December 16, 1969*; 7:35 pm, WOI (delay)		Wisconsin	W 84–73	4–3	Iowa State Armory; Ames, Iowa
December 20, 1969*; 8:15 pm, WOI (delay)		Augustana	W 90–58	5–3	Iowa State Armory; Ames, Iowa
December 27, 1969*; 9:00 pm		vs. Missouri; Big Eight Holiday Tournament Quarterfinals	L 50–52	5–4	Municipal Auditorium; Kansas City, Missouri
December 29, 1969*; 3:00 pm		vs. Nebraska; Big Eight Holiday Tournament Consolation Semifinals	L 66–74	5–5	Municipal Auditorium (8,155); Kansas City, Missouri
December 30, 1969*; 1:00 pm		vs. Oklahoma State; Big Eight Holiday Tournament Seventh Place	W 87–84 ^{2OT}	6–5	Municipal Auditorium; Kansas City, Missouri
January 6, 1970; 7:35 pm, WOI (delay)		Nebraska	W 72–70	7–5 (1–0)	Iowa State Armory; Ames, Iowa
January 10, 1970; 8:05 pm		at Kansas	L 62–82	7–6 (1–1)	Allen Fieldhouse; Lawrence, Kansas
January 17, 1970; 7:35 pm		at Missouri	L 63–65	7–7 (1–2)	Brewer Fieldhouse; Columbia, Missouri
January 19, 1970; 7:35 pm, WOI (delay)		Colorado	L 67–85	7–8 (1–3)	Iowa State Armory; Ames, Iowa
January 22, 1970*; 7:35 pm, WOI (delay)		Northern Illinois	W 97–90	8–8	Iowa State Armory; Ames, Iowa
January 26, 1970; 7:35 pm, WOI (delay)		Kansas	W 91–89 ^{OT}	9–8 (2–3)	Iowa State Armory; Ames, Iowa
January 31, 1970; 7:35 pm, WOI (delay)		Oklahoma State	W 75–61	10–8 (3–3)	Iowa State Armory; Ames, Iowa
February 2, 1970; 7:35 pm		at No. 19 Kansas State	L 64–82	10–9 (3–4)	Ahearn Fieldhouse; Manhattan, Kansas
February 7, 1970; 7:35 pm, WOI (delay)		Missouri	W 89–78	11–9 (4–4)	Iowa State Armory; Ames, Iowa
February 9, 1970; 7:35 pm, WOI (delay)		No. 18 Kansas State	W 80–64	12–9 (5–4)	Iowa State Armory; Ames, Iowa
February 14, 1970; 7:35 pm		at Oklahoma	L 68–74	12–10 (5–5)	OU Field House; Norman, Oklahoma
February 16, 1970; 7:35 pm		at Oklahoma State	L 62–72	12–11 (5–6)	Gallagher Hall; Stillwater, Oklahoma
February 21, 1970; 1:10 pm, TVS		Oklahoma	L 73–75	12–12 (5–7)	Iowa State Armory; Ames, Iowa
March 5, 1970; 9:00 pm		at Colorado	L 79–107	12–13 (5–8)	Balch Fieldhouse; Boulder, Colorado
March 7, 1970; 2:10 pm, Big Eight		at Nebraska	L 81–87	12–14 (5–9)	Nebraska Coliseum; Lincoln, Nebraska
*Non-conference game. ^{#}Rankings from AP poll. (#) Tournament seedings in parentheses. All times are in Central Time.
