= 1969–70 Kansas State Wildcats men's basketball team =

American college basketball season

1969–70 Kansas State Wildcats men's basketball

NCAA Men's Division I Tournament, Midwest Regional, Third Place
- Conference: Big Eight Conference
- Record: 20–8 (10–4 Big 8)
- Head coach: Cotton Fitzsimmons (2nd season)
- Home arena: Ahearn Field House

1969–70 Big Eight Conference men's basketball standings
	Conf.				Overall
Team	W		L	PCT	W		L	PCT
Kansas State	10	–	4	.714	20	–	8	.714
Kansas	8	–	6	.571	17	–	9	.654
Oklahoma	7	–	7	.500	19	–	9	.679
Nebraska	7	–	7	.500	16	–	9	.640
Missouri	7	–	7	.500	15	–	11	.577
Colorado	7	–	7	.500	14	–	12	.538
Oklahoma State	5	–	9	.357	14	–	12	.538
Iowa State	5	–	9	.357	12	–	14	.462
Rankings from AP Poll

The 1969–70 Kansas State Wildcats men's basketball team represented the Kansas State University during the 1969–70 college men's basketball season.

== Roster ==
1969–70 Kansas State Wildcats men's basketball team
Players	Coaches
Pos. / # / Name / Height / Weight / Year / Hometown; G / 24 / Jeff Webb / 6 ft 4 in (1.93 m) / 170 lb (77 kg) / Sr / West Allis, Wisconsin	Head coach: Cotton Fitzsimmons; Assistant coach(es) Legend: (C) Team captain; (S) Suspended; (I) Ineligible; (W) Walk-on; Injured; Current redshirt; Roster

== Schedule ==
Date time, TV	Rank^{#}	Opponent^{#}	Result	Record	Site city, state
Regular Season
Dec 1, 1969*		Indiana State	W 99–63	1–0	Ahearn Field House; Manhattan, Kansas
Dec 5, 1969*		at Creighton	W 64–56	2–0	Omaha Civic Auditorium; Omaha, Nebraska
Dec 8, 1969*		at Indiana	L 95–102	2–1	New Fieldhouse; Bloomington, IN
Dec 12, 1969*		Wichita State	W 81–69	3–1	Ahearn Field House; Manhattan, Kansas
Dec 13, 1969*		at Wichita State	L 73–77	3–2	Charles Koch Arena; Wichita, Kansas
Dec 15, 1969*		Vanderbilt	W 91–78	4–2	Ahearn Field House; Manhattan, Kansas
Dec 19, 1969*		at TCU	W 75–65	5–2	Daniel–Meyer Coliseum; Fort Worth, Texas
Dec 20, 1969*		vs. Texas-Arlington	W 67–62	6–2	Daniel–Meyer Coliseum; Fort Worth, Texas
Dec 26, 1969*		vs. Oklahoma State; Big Eight Holiday Tournament	W 51–49	7–2	Kansas City, Missouri
Dec 29, 1969*		vs. Oklahoma; Big Eight Holiday Tournament	L 67–72	7–3	Kansas City, Missouri
Dec 30, 1969*		vs. Missouri; Big Eight Holiday Tournament	W 64–58	8–3	Kansas City, Missouri
Jan 5, 1970		Oklahoma State	W 72–56	9–3 (1–0)	Ahearn Field House; Manhattan, Kansas
Jan 10, 1970		Oklahoma	W 77–56	10–3 (2–0)	Ahearn Field House; Manhattan, Kansas
Jan 13, 1970		at Nebraska	W 71–64	11–3 (3–0)	Nebraska Coliseum; Lincoln, Nebraska
Jan 17, 1970*		St. Francis	W 78–71	12–3 (3–0)	Ahearn Field House; Manhattan, Kansas
Jan 26, 1970		at Oklahoma State	W 71–60	13–3 (4–0)	Gallagher-Iba Arena; Stillwater, Oklahoma
Jan 31, 1970		Missouri	W 64–63	14–3 (5–0)	Ahearn Field House; Manhattan, Kansas
Feb 2, 1970		Iowa State	W 82–64	15–3 (6–0)	Ahearn Field House; Manhattan, Kansas
Feb 7, 1970		at Colorado	L 59–72	15–4 (6–1)	Balch Fieldhouse; Boulder, Colorado
Feb 9, 1970		at Iowa State	L 64–80	15–5 (6–2)	Iowa State Armory; Ames, Iowa
Feb 14, 1970		Kansas; Sunflower Showdown	W 71–68	16–5 (7–2)	Ahearn Field House; Manhattan, Kansas
Feb 16, 1970		at Missouri	W 63–60	17–5 (8–2)	Brewer Fieldhouse; Columbia, Missouri
Feb 21, 1970		Nebraska	W 69–62	18–5 (9–2)	Ahearn Field House; Manhattan, Kansas
Feb 26, 1970		Colorado	W 79–69	19–5 (10–2)	Ahearn Field House; Manhattan, Kansas
Feb 28, 1970		at Oklahoma	L 73–80	19–6 (10–3)	McCasland Field House; Norman, Oklahoma
Mar 7, 1970		at Kansas; Sunflower Showdown	L 79–82	19–7 (10–4)	Allen Fieldhouse; Lawrence, Kansas
NCAA Tournament
Mar 12, 1970*		vs. No. 5 New Mexico State; Semifinals	L 66–70	19–8 (10–4)	Allen Fieldhouse; Lawrence, Kansas
Mar 14, 1970*		vs. No. 12 Houston; Midwest Regional third place	W 107–98	20–8 (10–4)	Allen Fieldhouse; Lawrence, Kansas
*Non-conference game. ^{#}Rankings from AP Poll. (#) Tournament seedings in parentheses. MW=Midwest. All times are in Central Time.
