= 1969–70 Washington Huskies men's basketball team =

American college basketball season

1969–70 Washington Huskies men's basketball
- Conference: Pacific-8 Conference
- Record: 17–9 (7–7 Pac-8)
- Head coach: Tex Winter (2nd season)
- Home arena: Hec Edmundson Pavilion

1969–70 Pacific–8 Conference men's basketball standings
	Conf.				Overall
Team	W		L	PCT	W		L	PCT
No. 2 UCLA	12	–	2	.857	28	–	2	.933
Washington State	9	–	5	.643	19	–	7	.731
No. 20 USC	9	–	5	.643	18	–	8	.692
Oregon	8	–	6	.571	17	–	9	.654
Washington	7	–	7	.500	17	–	9	.654
California	5	–	9	.357	11	–	15	.423
Oregon State	4	–	10	.286	10	–	16	.385
Stanford	2	–	12	.143	5	–	20	.200
Rankings from AP Poll

The 1969–70 Washington Huskies men's basketball team represented the University of Washington for the 1969–70 NCAA college basketball season. Led by second-year head coach Tex Winter, the Huskies were members of the Pacific-8 Conference and played their home games on campus at Hec Edmundson Pavilion in Seattle, Washington.

The Huskies were 17–9 overall in the regular season and 7–7 in conference play, fifth in the standings.
