= 1969–70 South Carolina Gamecocks men's basketball team =

American college basketball season

1969–70 South Carolina Gamecocks men's basketball

ACC regular season champion
- Conference: Atlantic Coast Conference

Ranking
- Coaches: No. 6
- AP: No. 6
- Record: 25–3 (14–0 ACC)
- Head coach: Frank McGuire (6th season)
- Captain: Bobby Cremins
- Home arena: Carolina Coliseum

1969–70 ACC men's basketball standings
	Conf.				Overall
Team	W		L	PCT	W		L	PCT
No. 6 South Carolina	14	–	0	1.000	25	–	3	.893
North Carolina	9	–	5	.643	18	–	9	.667
No. 10 NC State †	9	–	5	.643	23	–	7	.767
Duke	8	–	6	.571	17	–	9	.654
Wake Forest	6	–	8	.429	14	–	13	.519
Maryland	5	–	9	.357	13	–	13	.500
Virginia	3	–	11	.214	10	–	15	.400
Clemson	2	–	12	.143	7	–	19	.269
† 1970 ACC tournament winner Rankings from AP Poll

The 1969–70 South Carolina Gamecocks men's basketball team represented the University of South Carolina during the 1969–70 men's college basketball season. South Carolina won their first ACC Regular season championship after going a perfect 14-0 in ACC play. Although they won the ACC regular season, they were denied a spot in the NCAA tournament after they lost a controversial ACC Championship tournament game to NC State in double overtime. Junior John Roche won ACC player of the year, and was a first team All American. South Carolina began the season ranked 1st in the AP poll, and finished 6th in both AP and Coaches.

== Roster ==
Name	Position	Height	Year	Stats
John Roche	Guard	6–3	Junior	22.2 Pts, 2.5 Reb
Tom Owens	Center	6–10	Junior	15.9 Pts, 14.0 Reb
Tom Riker	Forward	6–10	Sophomore	13.8 Pts, 9.0 Reb
Bobby Cremins	Guard	6–2	Senior	7.2 Pts, 5.4 Reb
Rick Aydlett	Forward	6–7	Sophomore	5.5 Pts, 4.0 Reb
John Ribock	Forward	6–8	Junior	5.2 Pts, 6.8 Reb
Bob Carver	Guard	6–2	Sophomore	3.5 Pts, 0.8 Reb
Gene Spencer	Forward	6–8	Senior	1.5 Pts, 0.9 Reb
Corkey Carnevale	Guard	6–3	Senior	1.0 Pts, 0.6 Reb
Tommy Terry	Guard	6–2	Senior	0.3 Pts, 1.0 Reb
Dennis Powell	Center	6–0	Junior	0.4 Pts, 0.1 Reb
Billy Grimes	Guard	6–5	Sophomore	0.0 Pts, 0.9 Reb

== Schedule ==
Date time, TV	Rank^{#}	Opponent^{#}	Result	Record	Site city, state
December 1*	No. 1	at Auburn	W 86–64	1-0	Beard–Eaves–Memorial Coliseum; Auburn, AL
December 6*	No. 1	Tennessee	L 55–56	1-1	Carolina Coliseum; Columbia, SC
December 10*	No. 8	at East Carolina	W 68-49	2-1	Williams Arena at Minges Coliseum; Greenville, NC
December 13	No. 8	at Virginia	W 62–51	3-1 (1-0)	University Hall; Charlottesville, VA
December 15	No. 8	at Maryland	W 101–68	4-1 (2-0)	Cole Fieldhouse; College Park, Maryland
December 18*	No. 5	Long Island	W 89–52	5-1	Carolina Coliseum; Columbia, SC
December 29*	No. 3	vs. New Mexico	W 85–62	6-1	Municipal Auditorium; New Orleans, LA
December 30*	No. 3	vs. No. 13 Notre Dame	W 84–83	7-1	Municipal Auditorium; New Orleans, LA
January 5	No. 3	No. 4 North Carolina	W 65–52	8-1 (3-0)	Carolina Coliseum; Columbia, SC
January 10	No. 3	Maryland	W 98–72	9-1 (4-0)	Carolina Coliseum; Columbia, SC
January 12	No. 3	Virginia	W 63–42	10-1 (5-0)	Carolina Coliseum; Columbia, SC
January 14*	No. 3	at Furman	W 59–56	11-1	Greenville Memorial Auditorium; Greenville, SC
January 26	No. 3	at Clemson	W 97–76	12-1 (6-0)	Littlejohn Coliseum; Clemson, SC
January 28	No. 4	Virginia Tech	W 86–54	13-1 (7-0)	Carolina Coliseum; Columbia, SC
January 31	No. 4	at Duke	W 67–55	14-1 (8-0)	Cameron Indoor Stadium; Durham, NC
February 4*	No. 2	at Temple	W 79–71	15-1	McGonigle Hall; Philadelphia, PA
February 7	No. 2	Clemson	W 99–52	16-1 (9-0)	Carolina Coliseum; Columbia, SC
February 9	No. 2	Wake Forest	W 81–54	17-1 (10-0)	Carolina Coliseum; Columbia, SC
February 11*	No. 2	No. 13 Davidson	L 62–68	17-2	Carolina Coliseum; Columbia, SC
February 14	No. 2	Duke	W 82–65	18-2 (10-0)	Carolina Coliseum; Columbia, SC
February 18	No. 4	at No. 12 NC State	W 71–69	19-2 (11-0)	Reynolds Coliseum; Raleigh, NC
February 21	No. 4	at No. 13 North Carolina	W 79–62	20-2 (12-0)	Carmichael Auditorium; Chapel Hill, NC
February 23	No. 4	at Wake Forest	W 67–51	21-2 (13-0)	Winston-Salem Memorial Coliseum; Winston-Salem, NC
February 28	No. 4	No. 14 NC State	W 85–69	22-2 (14-0)	Carolina Coliseum; Columbia, SC
March 5*	No. 3	vs. Clemson; ACC tournament	W 34–33	23-2	Charlotte Coliseum; Charlotte, NC
March 6*	No. 3	vs. Wake Forest; ACC tournament	W 79–63	24-2	Charlotte Coliseum; Charlotte, NC
March 7*	No. 3	vs. NC State; ACC tournament	L 39-42 ^{2OT}	24-3	Charlotte Coliseum; Charlotte, NC
*Non-conference game. ^{#}Rankings from AP Poll. (#) Tournament seedings in parentheses.

== Rankings ==
Ranking movements Legend: ██ Increase in ranking ██ Decrease in ranking
	Week															
Poll	Pre	1	2	3	4	5	6	7	8	9	10	11	12	13	14	Final
AP	1	1	8	5	3	3	3	3	3	4	2	2	4	4	3	6
Coaches	2	2	4	4	3	3	3	3	3	4	2	2	3	3	3	6
