= 1969–70 USC Trojans men's basketball team =

American college basketball season

1969–70 USC Trojans men's basketball
- Conference: Pacific-8 Conference

Ranking
- AP: No. 20
- Record: 18–8 (9–5 Pac-8)
- Head coach: Bob Boyd (3rd season)
- Home arena: Los Angeles Sports Arena

1969–70 Pacific–8 Conference men's basketball standings
	Conf.				Overall
Team	W		L	PCT	W		L	PCT
No. 2 UCLA	12	–	2	.857	28	–	2	.933
Washington State	9	–	5	.643	19	–	7	.731
No. 20 USC	9	–	5	.643	18	–	8	.692
Oregon	8	–	6	.571	17	–	9	.654
Washington	7	–	7	.500	17	–	9	.654
California	5	–	9	.357	11	–	15	.423
Oregon State	4	–	10	.286	10	–	16	.385
Stanford	2	–	12	.143	5	–	20	.200
Rankings from AP Poll

The 1969–70 USC Trojans men's basketball team represented the University of Southern California during the 1969–70 NCAA University Division men's basketball season. The Trojans were led by 3rd year coach Bob Boyd.

== Roster ==
1969–70 USC Trojans men's basketball team
Players	Coaches
Pos. / # / Name / Height / Weight / Year / Hometown; G / 25 / Paul Westphal / 6 ft 4 in (1.93 m) / 180 lb (82 kg) / So / Redondo Beach, California	Head coach: Bob Boyd; Assistant coach(es) Legend: (C) Team captain; (S) Suspended; (I) Ineligible; (W) Walk-on; Injured; Current redshirt

== Schedule ==
Date time, TV	Rank^{#}	Opponent^{#}	Result	Record	Site city, state
December 5*		Colorado	W 88–74	1–0	Los Angeles Sports Arena; Los Angeles, California
December 6*		Vanderbilt	W 108–89	2–0	Los Angeles Sports Arena; Los Angeles, California
December 12*		Seattle	L 70–74	2–1	Los Angeles Sports Arena; Los Angeles, California
December 13*; 8:00 pm	No. 6	Iowa State	W 70–59	3–1	Los Angeles Sports Arena; Los Angeles, California
December 18*	No. 13	at No. 15 LSU	W 101–98	4–1	John M. Parker Agricultural Coliseum; Baton Rouge, Louisiana
December 20*		at Houston	L 73–77	4–2	Hofheinz Pavilion; Houston, Texas
December 23*	No. 12	St. John's	W 95–59	5–2	Los Angeles Sports Arena; Los Angeles, California
December 26*		at No. 10 Washington	L 86–90	5–3	Bank of America Arena; Seattle, Washington
December 29*		vs. Temple; Far West Classic	W 68–53	6–3	Veterans Memorial Coliseum; Portland, Oregon
December 30*	No. 19	vs. Illinois; Far West Classic	W 65–62	7–3	Veterans Memorial Coliseum (6,324); Portland, Oregon
January 3*		Florida State	W 71–68	8–3	Los Angeles Sports Arena; Los Angeles, California
January 9		Oregon State	W 64–51	9–3 (1–0)	Los Angeles Sports Arena; Los Angeles, California
January 10		Oregon	W 77–68	10–3 (2–0)	Los Angeles Sports Arena; Los Angeles, California
January 24*		at Arizona State	W 108–95	11–3 (2–0)	Sun Devil Gym; Tempe, Arizona
January 30		at Stanford	W 71–68	12–3 (3–0)	Maples Pavilion; Stanford, California
January 31		at California	W 78–73	13–3 (4–0)	Harmon Gym; Berkeley, California
February 7		at Washington State	L 72–89	13–4 (4–1)	Bohler Gymnasium; Pullman, Washington
February 9		at Washington	L 72–77	13–5 (4–2)	Bank of America Arena; Seattle, Washington
February 13		Washington	W 84–81	14–5 (5–2)	Los Angeles Sports Arena; Los Angeles, California
February 14		Washington State	L 63–66	14–6 (5–3)	Los Angeles Sports Arena; Los Angeles, California
February 20		at Oregon	L 83–92	14–7 (5–4)	McArthur Court; Eugene, Oregon
February 21		at Oregon State	W 70–55	15–7 (6–4)	Gill Coliseum; Corvallis, Oregon
February 27		California	W 90–82	16–7 (7–4)	Los Angeles Sports Arena; Los Angeles, California
February 28		Stanford	W 85–71	17–7 (8–4)	Los Angeles Sports Arena; Los Angeles, California
March 6		at No. 1 UCLA	W 87–86	18–7 (9–4)	Pauley Pavilion; Los Angeles, California
March 7		No. 1 UCLA	L 78–91	18–8 (9–5)	Los Angeles Sports Arena; Los Angeles, California
*Non-conference game. ^{#}Rankings from AP Poll. (#) Tournament seedings in parentheses. All times are in Pacific Time.
