= 1969–70 Washington State Cougars men's basketball team =

American college basketball season

1969–70 Washington State Cougars men's basketball
- Conference: Pacific-8
- Record: 12–14 (2–12 Pac-8)
- Head coach: Marv Harshman (12th season)
- Assistant coach: Jud Heathcote
- Home arena: Bohler Gymnasium

1969–70 Pacific–8 Conference men's basketball standings
	Conf.				Overall
Team	W		L	PCT	W		L	PCT
No. 2 UCLA	12	–	2	.857	28	–	2	.933
Washington State	9	–	5	.643	19	–	7	.731
No. 20 USC	9	–	5	.643	18	–	8	.692
Oregon	8	–	6	.571	17	–	9	.654
Washington	7	–	7	.500	17	–	9	.654
California	5	–	9	.357	11	–	15	.423
Oregon State	4	–	10	.286	10	–	16	.385
Stanford	2	–	12	.143	5	–	20	.200
Rankings from AP Poll

The 1969–70 Washington State Cougars men's basketball team represented Washington State University for the 1969–70 NCAA college basketball season. Led by twelfth-year head coach Marv Harshman, the Cougars were members of the Pacific-8 Conference and played their home games on campus at Bohler Gymnasium in Pullman, Washington.

The Cougars were 19–7 overall in the regular season and 9–5 in conference play, tied for second in the standings.

After dropping consecutive games to champion UCLA, the Cougars finished the season on a six-game winning streak. Their overall record was the best at Washington State since the national runner-up season (26–6) of 1940–41.
