= 1969–70 Ohio Bobcats men's basketball team =

American college basketball season

1969–70 Ohio Bobcats men's basketball

MAC Regular Season champions

NCAA tournament, First Round
- Conference: Mid-American Conference
- Record: 20–5 (9–1 MAC)
- Head coach: Jim Snyder (21st season)
- Home arena: Convocation Center

1969–70 Mid-American Conference men's basketball standings
	Conf.				Overall
Team	W		L	PCT	W		L	PCT
Ohio	9	–	1	.900	20	–	5	.800
Bowling Green State	7	–	3	.700	15	–	9	.625
Miami (Ohio)	6	–	4	.600	15	–	9	.625
Toledo	5	–	5	.500	15	–	9	.625
Kent State	2	–	8	.200	7	–	17	.292
Western Michigan	1	–	9	.100	5	–	18	.217
Rankings from AP Poll

The 1969–70 Ohio Bobcats men's basketball team represented Ohio University as a member of the Mid-American Conference in the college basketball season of 1969–70. The team was coached by Jim Snyder and played their home games at Convocation Center. The Bobcats finished the regular season with a record of 20–4 and won MAC regular season title with a conference record of 9–1. They received a bid to the NCAA tournament. There they lost to Notre Dame in the First Round.

== Schedule ==
Date time, TV	Rank^{#}	Opponent^{#}	Result	Record	Site (attendance) city, state
Regular Season
12/1/1969*		at Northwestern	W 90–79	1–0	
12/6/1969*		No. 3 Purdue	W 80–79	2–0	
12/13/1969*	No. 19	at No. 16 Ohio State	W 82–80	3–0	
12/15/1969*	No. 10	at Indiana	W 89–83	4–0	
12/17/1969*	No. 10	at Northern Illinois	W 84–72	5–0	
12/20/1969*	No. 10	Ball State	W 92–82	6–0	
12/26/1969*	No. 5	Fresno State	W 92–80	7–0	
12/29/1969*	No. 5	vs. Texas; Hurricane Classic	L 65–73	7–1	
12/30/1969	No. 5	at Miami (FL); Hurricane Classic	W 99–74	8–1	
MAC regular season
1/3/1970	No. 5	Kent State	W 78–52	9–1 (1–0)	
1/10/1970	No. 9	at Bowling Green	L 65–85	9–2 (1–1)	
1/14/1970	No. 14	Miami (OH)	W 81–61	10–2 (2–1)	
1/17/1970	No. 14	Toledo	W 88–79	11–2 (3–1)	
1/24/1970	No. 13	at Kent State	W 77–68	12–2 (4–1)	
1/28/1970	No. 13	at Western Michigan	W 91–81	13-2 (5–1)	
1/31/1970*	No. 13	at Wisconsin	L 69–72	13-3	
2/4/1970		at Toledo	W 80–67	14–3 (6–1)	
2/7/1970		Western Michigan	W 107–68	15–3 (7–1)	
2/11/1970*		at Marshall	L 88–93	15–4	
2/14/1970		at Miami (OH)	W 58–57	16–4 (8–1)	
2/18/1970*		Marshall	W 100–86	17–4	
2/21/1970*		Virginia Commonwealth	W 95–75	18–4	
2/25/1970*		Loyola (IL)	W 93–70	19–4	
2/28/1970		Bowling Green	W 77–76	20–4 (9–1)	
NCAA Tournament
3/7/1970*	No. 17	vs. No. 15 Notre Dame	L 82–112	20–5	
*Non-conference game. ^{#}Rankings from AP Poll. (#) Tournament seedings in parentheses. All times are in Eastern Time.

== Statistics ==
=== Team statistics ===
Final 1969–70 statistics

Record	Ohio	OPP
Scoring	2102	1903
Scoring Average	84.08	76.12
Field goals – Att	820–1839	696–1643
Free throws – Att	462–701	511–770
Rebounds	1291	1173
Assists		
Turnovers		
Steals		
Blocked Shots		

=== Player statistics ===
			Minutes		Scoring		Total FGs			Free-Throws			Rebounds						
Player	GP	GS	Tot	Avg	Pts	Avg	FG	FGA	Pct	FT	FTA	Pct	Tot	Avg	A	PF	TO	Stl	Blk
John Canine	25	-			471	18.8	199	444	0.448	73	93	0.785	71	2.8		60			
Greg McDivitt	25	-			368	14.7	140	335	0.418	88	122	0.721	225	9.0		90			
Craig Love	25	-			341	13.6	144	283	0.509	53	96	0.552	322	12.9		90			
Ken Kowall	25	-			274	11.0	106	248	0.427	62	110	0.564	67	2.7		64			
Dave Groff	25	-			251	10.0	86	165	0.521	79	119	0.664	158	6.3		81			
Doug Parker	25	-			133	5.3	52	121	0.430	29	45	0.644	101	4.0		73			
Tom Corde	25	-			131	5.2	46	118	0.390	39	55	0.709	41	1.6		49			
Gary Wolf	19	-			50	2.6	20	37	0.541	10	17	0.588	40	2.1		22			
Larry Hunter	18	-			26	1.4	8	20	0.400	10	14	0.714	10	0.6		23			
Mike Miller	12	-			18	1.5	7	19	0.368	4	8	0.500	3	0.3		5			
John Glancy		-																	
Bernard Rumpke		-																	
Total	25	-	-	-	2102	84.1	820	1839	0.446	462	701	0.659	1291	51.6		586			
Opponents	25	-	-	-	1903	76.1	696	1643	0.424	511	770	0.664	1173	46.9		518			

Legend
GP	Games played	GS	Games started	Avg	Average per game
FG	Field-goals made	FGA	Field-goal attempts	Off	Offensive rebounds
Def	Defensive rebounds	A	Assists	TO	Turnovers
Blk	Blocks	Stl	Steals	High	Team high
