= 1969–70 North Carolina Tar Heels men's basketball team =

American college basketball season

1969–70 North Carolina Tar Heels men's basketball

NIT, First Round
- Conference: Atlantic Coast Conference
- Record: 18–9 (9–5 ACC)
- Head coach: Dean Smith (9th season)
- Assistant coach: Bill Guthridge (3rd season)
- Captains: Jim Delany; Eddie Fogler; Charlie Scott
- Home arena: Carmichael Auditorium

1969–70 ACC men's basketball standings
	Conf.				Overall
Team	W		L	PCT	W		L	PCT
No. 6 South Carolina	14	–	0	1.000	25	–	3	.893
North Carolina	9	–	5	.643	18	–	9	.667
No. 10 NC State †	9	–	5	.643	23	–	7	.767
Duke	8	–	6	.571	17	–	9	.654
Wake Forest	6	–	8	.429	14	–	13	.519
Maryland	5	–	9	.357	13	–	13	.500
Virginia	3	–	11	.214	10	–	15	.400
Clemson	2	–	12	.143	7	–	19	.269
† 1970 ACC tournament winner Rankings from AP Poll

The 1969–70 North Carolina Tar Heels men's basketball team represented the University of North Carolina at Chapel Hill during the 1969–70 NCAA University Division men's basketball season.

== Schedule ==
Date time, TV	Rank^{#}	Opponent^{#}	Result	Record	Site city, state
December 1*	No. 7	Florida Southern	W 112–47		Carmichael Auditorium; Chapel Hill, NC
December 3*	No. 7	Mercer	W 100–52		Carmichael Auditorium; Chapel Hill, NC
December 8*	No. 7	vs. No. 2 Kentucky	L 87–94		Charlotte, NC
December 13*	No. 5	vs. Florida State	W 86–75		Greensboro, NC
December 16	No. 5	at Virginia	W 80–76		Charlottesville, VA
December 20*	No. 7	at Tulane	W 96–87		New Orleans, LA
December 22*	No. 7	at Rice	W 99–87		Houston, TX
December 29*	No. 4	vs. Harvard; Carolina Classic	W 92–74		Greensboro, NC
December 30*	No. 4	vs. Bowling Green; Carolina Classic	W 89–72		Greensboro, NC
January 3*	No. 4	vs. Rice	W 98–72		Charlotte, NC
January 5	No. 4	at No. 3 South Carolina	L 52–65		Carolina Coliseum; Columbia, SC
January 7	No. 4	at No. 10 NC State	W 78–69		Raleigh, NC
January 10	No. 4	No. 19 Duke	W 86–78		Carmichael Auditorium; Chapel Hill, NC
January 15	No. 7	at Clemson	W 96–91		Littlejohn Coliseum; Clemson, SC
January 17	No. 7	Wake Forest	L 90–91		Carmichael Auditorium; Chapel Hill, NC
January 31	No. 9	at Maryland	W 77–69		Cole Field House; College Park, MD
February 3	No. 9	Virginia	W 87–72		Carmichael Auditorium; Chapel Hill, NC
February 5	No. 7	at Wake Forest	L 85–88		Winston-Salem, NC
February 9	No. 7	No. 5 NC State	W 88–86		Carmichael Auditorium; Chapel Hill, NC
February 13	No. 10	vs. Clemson; North-South Doubleheader	W 110–66		Charlotte Coliseum; Charlotte, NC
February 14*	No. 10	vs. Georgia Tech; North-South Doubleheader	L 95–104		Charlotte, NC
February 18	No. 13	Maryland	W 90–83		Carmichael Auditorium; Chapel Hill, NC
February 21	No. 13	No. 4 South Carolina	L 62–79		Carmichael Auditorium; Chapel Hill, NC
February 25*	No. 19	Virginia Tech	W 98–70		Carmichael Auditorium; Chapel Hill, NC
February 28	No. 19	at Duke	L 83–91		Cameron Indoor Stadium; Durham, NC
March 5*		vs. Virginia; ACC tournament	L 93–95		Charlotte, NC
March 14*		vs. Manhattan; NIT • First Round	L 90–95		Madison Square Garden; New York, NY
*Non-conference game. ^{#}Rankings from AP Poll. (#) Tournament seedings in parentheses.
