= 1969–70 Yale Bulldogs men's basketball team =

American college basketball season

1969–70 Yale Bulldogs men's basketball
- Conference: Ivy League
- Record: 11–13 (7–7 Ivy)
- Head coach: Joe Vancisin (14th season)
- Home arena: John J. Lee Amphitheater

The 1969–70 Yale Bulldogs men's basketball team represented Yale University during the 1969–70 men's college basketball season. The Bulldogs, led by 14th year head coach Joe Vancisin, played their home games at John J. Lee Amphitheater of the Payne Whitney Gymnasium and were members of the Ivy League. They finished the season 11–13, 7–7 in Ivy League play to finish in fourth place.

== Schedule ==
| Date time, TV | Rank^{#} | Opponent^{#} | Result | Record | Site city, state |
|---|---|---|---|---|---|
| December 3* | | Fordham | L 67–92 | 0–1 | Payne Whitney Gymnasium; New Haven, CT |
| December 6* | | at Connecticut | L 77–91 | 0–2 | Hugh S. Greer Field House; Storrs, CT |
| December 10 | | at Brown | W 75–65 | 1–2 (1—0) | Marvel Gymnasium; Providence, RI |
| December 13* | | at Holy Cross | L 85–88 | 1–3 (1—0) | Worcester Memorial Auditorium; Worcester, Massachusetts |
| December 16 | | Brown | W 64–58 | 2–3 (2—0) | Payne Whitney Gymnasium; New Haven, CT |
| December 19* | | vs. La Salle | L 59–81 | 2–4 (2—0) | |
| December 20* | | vs. Montana State | W 78–65 | 3–4 (2—0) | |
| December 22* | | at Idaho | L 55–64 | 3–5 (2—0) | |
| December 26* | | vs. Hawaii | W 88–77 | 4–5 (2—0) | |
| December 29* | | vs. San Francisco; Rainbow Classic | W 75–67 | 5–5 (2—0) | |
| December 30* | | vs. LSU; Rainbow Classic | W 97–94 | 6–5 (2—0) | |
| January 3* | | at Washington | L 70–84 | 6–6 (2—0) | Hec Edmundson Pavilion; Seattle, Washington |
| January 9 | | at Columbia | L 80–81 | 6–7 (2—1) | University Heights Gymnasium; New York City |
| January 10 | | at Cornell | W 72–60 | 7–7 (3—1) | Barton Hall; Ithaca, NY |
| January 30 | | Harvard | W 86–75 | 8–7 (4—1) | Payne Whitney Gymnasium; New Haven, CT |
| January 31 | | Dartmouth | L 59–87 | 8–8 (4—2) | Payne Whitney Gymnasium; New Haven, CT |
| February 6 | | Cornell | W 82–64 | 9–8 (5—2) | Payne Whitney Gymnasium; New Haven, CT |
| February 7 | | Columbia | L 69–96 | 9–9 (5—3) | Payne Whitney Gymnasium; New Haven, CT |
| February 13 | | at Penn | L 62–70 | 9–10 (5—4) | The Palestra; Philadelphia, Pennsylvania |
| February 14 | | at Princeton | L 68–91 | 9–11 (5—5) | Jadwin Gymnasium; Princeton, NJ |
| February 20 | | Penn | L 71–87 | 9–12 (5—6) | Payne Whitney Gymnasium; New Haven, CT |
| February 21 | | Princeton | W 65–58 | 10–12 (6—6) | Payne Whitney Gymnasium; New Haven, CT |
| February 27 | | at Dartmouth | L 66–69 | 10–13 (6—7) | Alumni Gymnasium; Hanover, NH |
| February 28 | | at Harvard | W 112–88 | 11–13 (7—7) | Malkin Athletic Center; Cambridge, Massachusetts |
*Non-conference game. ^{#}Rankings from AP Poll. (#) Tournament seedings in parentheses.
