= 1969–70 Idaho Vandals men's basketball team =

American college basketball season

1969–70 Idaho Vandals men's basketball
- Conference: Big Sky Conference
- Record: 10–15 (6–9 Big Sky)
- Head coach: Wayne Anderson (4th season)
- MVP: Malcolm Taylor
- Captain: John Nelson
- Home arena: Memorial Gymnasium

1969–70 Big Sky men's basketball standings
	Conf.				Overall
Team	W		L	PCT	W		L	PCT
Weber State	12	–	3	.800	19	–	8	.704
Idaho State	11	–	4	.733	14	–	11	.560
Gonzaga	7	–	8	.467	10	–	16	.385
Idaho	6	–	9	.400	10	–	15	.400
Montana	5	–	10	.333	8	–	18	.308
Montana State	4	–	11	.267	4	–	22	.154

The 1969–70 Idaho Vandals men's basketball team represented the University of Idaho during the 1969–70 NCAA University Division basketball season. Charter members of the Big Sky Conference, the Vandals were led by fourth-year head coach Wayne Anderson and played their home games on campus at the Memorial Gymnasium in Moscow, Idaho. They were 10–15 overall and 6–9 in conference play, and ended on a five-game winning streak.

No Vandals were selected for the all-conference team; junior forwards Malcolm Taylor and John Nelson, team captain, were on the second team. Taylor was voted the team's outstanding player.
