= 1969–70 Drexel Dragons men's basketball team =

American college basketball season

1969–70 Drexel Dragons men's basketball
- Conference: Middle Atlantic Conferences
- College–Southern
- Record: 11–11 (7–6 MAC)
- Head coach: Frank Szymanski (2nd season)
- Captains: Phil Kircher; Steve Lilly
- Home arena: 32nd Street Armory

1969–70 MAC men's basketball standings
	Conf.				Overall
Team	W		L	PCT	W		L	PCT
University–Eastern
Saint Joseph's	5	–	0	1.000	15	–	12	.556
La Salle	3	–	2	.600	14	–	12	.538
Temple †	2	–	3	.400	15	–	13	.536
Hofstra	2	–	3	.400	13	–	13	.500
American	2	–	3	.400	11	–	12	.478
West Chester	1	–	4	.200	11	–	15	.423
University–Western
Lehigh	7	–	3	.700	13	–	14	.481
Lafayette	7	–	3	.700	12	–	14	.462
Rider	7	–	3	.700	16	–	10	.615
Delaware	6	–	4	.600	16	–	9	.640
Bucknell	3	–	7	.300	6	–	17	.261
Gettysburg	0	–	10	.000	8	–	18	.308
College–Northern
Philadelphia Textile †		–		–		–		–
Scranton	10	–	4	.714	15	–	8	.652
Upsala		–		–		–		–
Juniata	8	–	4	.667	14	–	8	.636
Wagner	6	–	5	.545	11	–	14	.440
Elizabethtown	7	–	6	.538	9	–	13	.409
Susquehanna	8	–	8	.500	12	–	11	.522
Albright	7	–	10	.412	7	–	18	.280
Lycoming	3	–	12	.200	4	–	15	.211
College–Southern
Muhlenberg †	13	–	1	.929	16	–	6	.727
Pennsylvania Military		–		–		–		–
Johns Hopkins	8	–	4	.667	10	–	8	.556
Dickinson	11	–	6	.647	13	–	11	.542
Drexel	7	–	6	.538	11	–	11	.500
Ursinus	8	–	8	.500	9	–	9	.500
Swarthmore	7	–	7	.500	10	–	8	.556
Lebanon Valley	6	–	11	.353	7	–	13	.350
Moravian	4	–	16	.200	4	–	17	.190
Franklin & Marshall	3	–	12	.200	3	–	17	.150
Haverford	2	–	12	.143	5	–	14	.263
† 1970 MAC men's basketball tournament winner University division only counted games within their division. College division counted games across Northern/Southern. Rankings from AP Poll

The 1969–70 Drexel Dragons men's basketball team represented Drexel Institute of Technology during the 1969–70 men's basketball season. The Dragons, led by 2nd year head coach Frank Szymanski, played their home games at the 32nd Street Armory and were members of the College–Southern division of the Middle Atlantic Conferences (MAC).

The team finished the season 11–11.

== Roster ==
1969–70 Drexel Dragons men's basketball team
Players	Coaches
Pos. / # / Name / Height / Weight / Year / Previous school / Hometown; / / / — / —	Head coach: Frank Szymanski; Assistant coach(es) Legend: (C) Team captain; (S) Suspended; (I) Ineligible; (W) Walk-on; Injured; Current redshirt

== Schedule ==
Date time, TV	Rank^{#}	Opponent^{#}	Result	Record	High points	High rebounds	High assists	Site (attendance) city, state
Regular season
December 1969		Delaware Valley	W 61–56	1–0 (1–0)	–	–	–	32nd Street Armory (1,500); Philadelphia, PA
December 6, 1969		Philadelphia Textile	L 37–64	1–1 (1–1)	–	–	–	
Unknown		Pennsylvania Military College	L 55–60	1–2 (1–2)	–	–	–	
December 16, 1969		at Lebanon Valley	W 57–51	2–2 (2–2)	–	–	–	
December 20, 1969*		Rensselaer	W 72–64	3–2	–	–	–	32nd Street Armory; Philadelphia, PA
Unknown*		Bloomsburg State; Tournament	W 61–55	4–2	–	–	–	
Unknown*		Towson State; Tournament	L 45–52	4–3	–	–	–	
January 3, 1970*		at Delaware	L 58–63	4–4	–	–	–	
Unknown		Muhlenberg	W 82–67	5–4 (3–2)	23 – Coley	–	–	32nd Street Armory; Philadelphia, PA
Unknown*		West Chester	W 63–58	6–4	22 – Coley	–	–	32nd Street Armory; Philadelphia, PA
January 13, 1970		at Swarthmore	L 59–60	6–5 (3–3)	25 – Lilly	17 – Lilly	–	
Unknown		Moravian	W 60–54	7–5 (4–3)	20 – Coley	10 – 2 Tied	–	32nd Street Armory; Philadelphia, PA
January 24, 1970*		at Gettysburg	L 55–76	7–6	19 – Coley	–	–	Bream Gym; Gettysburg, PA
January 28, 1970*		Delaware	L 85–88 ^{OT}	7–7	–	–	–	32nd Street Armory; Philadelphia, PA
January 31, 1970*; 8:00 pm		Rider	L 54–61	7–8	–	–	–	32nd Street Armory; Philadelphia, PA
February 4, 1970		at Haverford	W 37–26	8–8 (5–3)	–	–	–	Haverford, PA
February 7, 1970		Johns Hopkins	W 48–46	9–8 (6–3)	–	–	–	32nd Street Armory; Philadelphia, PA
Unknown		Wagner	L 68–73	9–9 (6–4)	20 – Coley	–	–	32nd Street Armory; Philadelphia, PA
February 14, 1970		at Scranton	L 62–68	9–10 (6–5)	–	–	–	Long Field House (5,000); Scranton, PA
Unknown		Ursinus	L 59–61	9–11 (6–6)	–	–	–	
February 21, 1970		Franklin & Marshall	W 63–51	10–11 (7–6)	–	–	–	
February 25, 1970*		Upsala	W 59–58	11–11	27 – Coley	–	–	(600)
February 28, 1970		at Lehigh; Cancelled						
*Non-conference game. ^{#}Rankings from AP. (#) Tournament seedings in parentheses. All times are in Eastern Time.
