= 1969–70 Weber State Wildcats men's basketball team =

American college basketball season

1969–70 Weber State Wildcats men's basketball

Big Sky champions

NCAA tournament, First round
- Conference: Big Sky Conference
- Record: 19–8 (12–3 Big Sky)
- Head coach: Phil Johnson (2nd season)
- Assistant coach: Gene Visscher
- Home arena: Wildcat Gym

1969–70 Big Sky men's basketball standings
	Conf.				Overall
Team	W		L	PCT	W		L	PCT
Weber State	12	–	3	.800	19	–	8	.704
Idaho State	11	–	4	.733	14	–	11	.560
Gonzaga	7	–	8	.467	10	–	16	.385
Idaho	6	–	9	.400	10	–	15	.400
Montana	5	–	10	.333	8	–	18	.308
Montana State	4	–	11	.267	4	–	22	.154

The 1969–70 Weber State Wildcats men's basketball team represented Weber State College during the 1969–70 NCAA University Division basketball season. Members of the Big Sky Conference, the Wildcats were led by second-year head coach Phil Johnson and played their home games on campus at Wildcat Gym in Ogden, Utah. They were 19–7 in the regular season and 12–3 in conference play.

The conference tournament was six years away, and for the third consecutive season, Weber State won the Big Sky title and played in the 25-team NCAA tournament. In the West regional at nearby Provo, they met Jerry Tarkanian's Long Beach State 49ers in the first round and lost by 19 points.

Junior forward Willie Sojourner was a unanimous selection to the all-conference team, joined by senior guard Sessions Harlan. Sojourner was an honorable mention AP All-American twice and was All-Big Sky for three consecutive seasons.

After the following season, Johnson became an assistant in the NBA with the Chicago Bulls under Dick Motta, whom he had played for in high school in Idaho and coached under at Weber.

== Postseason result ==
Date time, TV	Opponent	Result	Record	Site (attendance) city, state
NCAA tournament
Sat, March 7*; 7:05 pm	vs. Long Beach State; First round	L 73–92	19–8	Smith Fieldhouse (10,500); Provo, Utah
*Non-conference game. ^{#}Rankings from AP poll. (#) Tournament seedings in parentheses. All times are in Mountain time.
