= 1969–70 Gonzaga Bulldogs men's basketball team =

American college basketball season

1969–70 Gonzaga Bulldogs men's basketball
- Conference: Big Sky Conference
- Record: 10–16 (7–8 Big Sky)
- Head coach: Hank Anderson (19th season)
- Home arena: Kennedy Pavilion

1969–70 Big Sky men's basketball standings
	Conf.				Overall
Team	W		L	PCT	W		L	PCT
Weber State	12	–	3	.800	19	–	8	.704
Idaho State	11	–	4	.733	14	–	11	.560
Gonzaga	7	–	8	.467	10	–	16	.385
Idaho	6	–	9	.400	10	–	15	.400
Montana	5	–	10	.333	8	–	18	.308
Montana State	4	–	11	.267	4	–	22	.154

The 1969–70 Gonzaga Bulldogs men's basketball team represented Gonzaga University during the 1969–70 NCAA University Division basketball season. Members of the Big Sky Conference, the Bulldogs were led by nineteenth-year head coach Hank Anderson and played their home games on campus at Kennedy Pavilion in Spokane, Washington. They were 10–16 overall and 7–8 in conference play.

Junior center Bill Quigg was named to the all-conference team.

== Schedule ==
Date time, TV	Rank^{#}	Opponent^{#}	Result	Record	Site city, state
Dec 1, 1969*		at Washington State	L 69–85	0–1	
Dec 6, 1969*		at Puget Sound	L 49–68	0–2	
Dec 11, 1969*		at Mankato State	W 69–52	1–2	
Dec 13, 1969*		at Oregon State	L 53–67	1–3	
Dec 16, 1969*		at Seattle University	L 68–73	1–4	
Dec 18, 1969*		at Boise State	L 72–92	1–5	
Dec 20, 1969*		at Oregon	L 63–74	1–6	
Jan 2, 1970*		at Portland	L 84–95	1–7	
Jan 3, 1970*		at Washington State	L 66–73	1–8	
Jan 9, 1970		at Weber State	L 72–120	1–9	
Jan 10, 1970		at Idaho State	L 81–85	1–10	
Jan 12, 1970		at Idaho State	L 88–94	1–11	
Jan 24, 1970*		at Portland State	W 83–59	2–11	
Jan 36, 1970*		at St. Martin’s	W 72–62	3–11	
Feb 6, 1970		at Weber State	L 41–43	3–12	
Feb 7, 1970		at Weber State	W 67–66	4–12	
Feb 9, 1970		at Idaho State	W 74–62	5–12	
Feb 13, 1970		at Montana	W 68–67	6–12	
Feb 14, 1970		at Montana	L 92–98	6–13	
Feb 16, 1970		at Montana State	W 79–58	7–13	
Feb 21, 1970		at Idaho	W 61–54	8–13	
Feb 27, 1970		at Montana State	L 61–64	8–14	
Feb 28, 1970		at Montana State	W 79–76	9–14	
Mar 2, 1970		at Montana	W 85–66	10–14	
Mar 6, 1970		at Idaho	L 59–60	10–15	
Mar 7, 1970		at Idaho	L 73–83	10–16	
*Non-conference game. ^{#}Rankings from AP Poll. (#) Tournament seedings in parentheses.
