= 1969–70 Idaho State Bengals men's basketball team =

American college basketball season

1969–70 Idaho State Bengals men's basketball
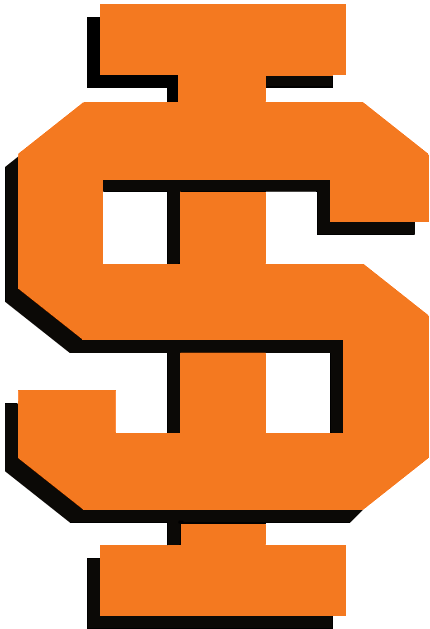
- Conference: Big Sky Conference
- Record: 14–11 (11–4 Big Sky)
- Head coach: Dan Miller (3rd season)
- Home arena: Reed Gym

1969–70 Big Sky men's basketball standings
	Conf.				Overall
Team	W		L	PCT	W		L	PCT
Weber State	12	–	3	.800	19	–	8	.704
Idaho State	11	–	4	.733	14	–	11	.560
Gonzaga	7	–	8	.467	10	–	16	.385
Idaho	6	–	9	.400	10	–	15	.400
Montana	5	–	10	.333	8	–	18	.308
Montana State	4	–	11	.267	4	–	22	.154

The 1969–70 Idaho State Bengals men's basketball team represented Idaho State University during the 1969–70 NCAA University Division basketball season. Led by third-year head coach Dan Miller, the Bengals played their home games on campus at Reed Gym in Pocatello.

Idaho State finished the regular season at 14–11 overall, with a 11–4 record in the Big Sky Conference, runner-up to champion Weber State.

Junior guard Willie Humes averaged nearly 29 points per game and was unanimously selected to the all-conference team; junior guard O'Neill Simmons was on the second team.

The new ISU Minidome was completed after the season and became the new home court that autumn.
