= Carl Stone =

Carl Stone may refer to:

- Carl Stone (composer), American electronic music composer
- Carl Stone (sociologist), Jamaican political sociologist
