= 1969–70 Duke Blue Devils men's basketball team =

American college basketball season

1969–70 Duke Blue Devils men's basketball

NIT, First round
- Conference: Atlantic Coast Conference
- Record: 17–9 (8–6 ACC)
- Head coach: Bucky Waters
- Home arena: Duke Indoor Stadium

1969–70 ACC men's basketball standings
| | Conf. | | | | Overall |
| Team | W | | L | PCT | W | | L | PCT |
|---|---|---|---|---|---|---|---|---|
| No. 6 South Carolina | 14 | – | 0 | 1.000 | 25 | – | 3 | .893 |
| North Carolina | 9 | – | 5 | .643 | 18 | – | 9 | .667 |
| No. 10 NC State † | 9 | – | 5 | .643 | 23 | – | 7 | .767 |
| Duke | 8 | – | 6 | .571 | 17 | – | 9 | .654 |
| Wake Forest | 6 | – | 8 | .429 | 14 | – | 13 | .519 |
| Maryland | 5 | – | 9 | .357 | 13 | – | 13 | .500 |
| Virginia | 3 | – | 11 | .214 | 10 | – | 15 | .400 |
| Clemson | 2 | – | 12 | .143 | 7 | – | 19 | .269 |
† 1970 ACC tournament winner Rankings from AP Poll

The 1969–70 Duke Blue Devils men's basketball team represented Duke University in the 1969–70 NCAA University Division men's basketball season. The head coach was Bucky Waters and the team finished the season with an overall record of 17–9 and did not qualify for the NCAA tournament.
