= Wayne Dobbs =

American college basketball and baseball coach

Biographical details
- Born: June 12, 1939
- Died: February 10, 2015 (aged 75)

Playing career
- 1958–1961: Oglethorpe

Coaching career (HC unless noted)

Basketball
- 1964–1966: Belmont
- 1966–1967: George Washington (asst.)
- 1967–1970: George Washington
- 1970–1976: Vanderbilt (asst.)
- 1976–1979: Vanderbilt

Baseball
- 1965–1966: Belmont

Wayne Dobbs (June 12, 1939 – February 10, 2015) was an American college basketball and baseball coach. He served as head basketball coach at Belmont University, George Washington University and Vanderbilt University. Dobbs died on February 10, 2015.
