= 1969–70 Connecticut Huskies men's basketball team =

American college basketball season

1969–70 Connecticut Huskies men's basketball

Yankee Conference Regular Season Champions
- Conference: Yankee Conference
- Record: 14–9 (8–2 YC)
- Head coach: Dee Rowe (1st season)
- Assistant coaches: Fred Barakat; Dick Stewart
- Home arena: Hugh S. Greer Field House

1969–70 Yankee Conference men's basketball standings
	Conf.				Overall
Team	W		L	PCT	W		L	PCT
Massachusetts	8	–	2	.800	18	–	7	.720
Connecticut	8	–	2	.800	14	–	9	.609
Rhode Island	7	–	3	.700	16	–	10	.615
New Hampshire	3	–	7	.300	12	–	11	.522
Vermont	3	–	7	.300	8	–	16	.333
Maine	1	–	9	.100	7	–	17	.292

The 1969–70 Connecticut Huskies men's basketball team represented the University of Connecticut in the 1969–70 NCAA University Division men's basketball season. The Huskies completed the season with a 14–9 overall record. The Huskies were members of the Yankee Conference, where they ended the season with an 8–2 record. They were the Yankee Conference Regular Season Champions. The Huskies played their home games at Hugh S. Greer Field House in Storrs, Connecticut, and were led by first-year head coach Dee Rowe.

== Schedule ==
Date time, TV	Rank^{#}	Opponent^{#}	Result	Record	Site (attendance) city, state
Regular Season
12/3/1969*		Fairfield	W 65–64	1–0	Hugh S. Greer Field House; Storrs, CT
12/6/1969*		Yale	W 91–77	2–0	Hugh S. Greer Field House; Storrs, CT
12/10/1969		New Hampshire	W 81–61	3–0 (1–0)	Hugh S. Greer Field House; Storrs, CT
12/13/1969*		Boston College	W 77–72	4–0	Hugh S. Greer Field House; Storrs, CT
12/16/1969		at Massachusetts	W 88–71	5–0 (2–0)	Curry Hicks Cage; Amherst, MA
12/20/1969*		at Holy Cross	L 104–122	5–1	Worcester, MA
12/23/1969*		Manhattan	L 62–75	5–2	Hugh S. Greer Field House; Storrs, CT
12/27/1969*		vs. Villanova; Quaker City Tournament	L 71–89	5–3	Spectrum; Philadelphia, PA
12/29/1969*		vs. Wake Forest; Quaker City Tournament	L 77–103	5–4	Spectrum; Philadelphia, PA
1/5/1970		at Maine	W 83–75	6–4 (3–0)	Memorial Gymnasium; Orono, ME
1/10/1970		at Rhode Island	W 77–74 ^{OT}	7–4 (4–0)	Keaney Gymnasium; Kingston, RI
1/22/1970		at Vermont	W 85–75	8–4 (5–0)	Patrick Gym; Burlington, VT
1/24/1970*		at Dartmouth	L 83–88	8–5	Alumni Gymnasium; Hanover, NH
1/26/1970*		at Boston University	W 90–81 ^{OT}	9–5	Boston, MA
1/31/1970		Vermont	L 63–69	9–6 (5–1)	Hugh S. Greer Field House; Storrs, CT
2/3/1970*		at Fordham	W 66–64	10–6	Rose Hill Gymnasium; New York, NY
2/7/1970		Maine	W 99–74	11–6 (6–1)	Hugh S. Greer Field House; Storrs, CT
2/11/1970*		at Syracuse; Rivalry	L 80–101	11–7	Manley Field House; Syracuse, NY
2/14/1970		Massachusetts	L 65–71	11–8 (6–2)	Hugh S. Greer Field House; Storrs, CT
2/18/1970		at New Hampshire	W 80–69	12–8 (7–2)	Lundholm Gym; Durham, NH
2/21/1970*		Colgate	W 96–82	13–8	Hugh S. Greer Field House; Storrs, CT
2/24/1970*		at Rutgers	L 84–90 ^{OT}	13–9	College Avenue Gymnasium; New Brunswick, NJ
2/28/1970		Rhode Island	W 35–32	14–9 (8–2)	Hugh S. Greer Field House; Storrs, CT
*Non-conference game. ^{#}Rankings from AP Poll. (#) Tournament seedings in parentheses. All times are in Eastern Time.

Schedule Source:
