= 1969–70 Auburn Tigers men's basketball team =

American college basketball season

1969–70 Auburn Tigers men's basketball

Vanderbilt Classic champions
- Conference: Southeastern Conference
- Record: 15–11 (11–7 SEC)
- Head coach: Bill Lynn (7th season)
- Captains: Carl Shetler; Bill Alexander
- Home arena: Memorial Coliseum

1969–70 Southeastern Conference men's basketball standings
	Conf.				Overall
Team	W		L	PCT	W		L	PCT
No. 1 Kentucky	17	–	1	.944	26	–	2	.929
LSU	13	–	5	.722	22	–	10	.688
Auburn	11	–	7	.611	15	–	11	.577
Georgia	11	–	7	.611	13	–	12	.520
Tennessee	10	–	8	.556	16	–	9	.640
Vanderbilt	8	–	10	.444	12	–	14	.462
Ole Miss	6	–	12	.333	10	–	15	.400
Florida	6	–	12	.333	9	–	17	.346
Alabama	5	–	13	.278	8	–	18	.308
Mississippi State	3	–	15	.167	6	–	18	.250
Rankings from AP Poll

The 1969–70 Auburn Tigers men's basketball team represented Auburn University in the 1969–70 college basketball season. The team's head coach was Bill Lynn, who was in his seventh season at Auburn. The team played their home games at Memorial Coliseum in Auburn, Alabama. They finished the season 15–11, 11–7 in SEC play.
