= 1970–71 NCAA University Division men's basketball season =

Men's collegiate basketball season

- Preseason AP No. 1: UCLA Bruins
- NCAA Tournament: 1971
- Tournament dates: March 13 – 27, 1971
- National Championship: Astrodome; Houston, Texas
- NCAA Champions: UCLA Bruins
- Helms National Champions: UCLA Bruins
- Other champions: North Carolina Tar Heels (NIT)
- Player of the Year (Naismith, Wooden): Austin Carr, Notre Dame Fighting Irish (Naismith)
- Player of the Year (Helms): Austin Carr, Notre Dame Fighting Irish; Sidney Wicks, UCLA Bruins

The 1970–71 NCAA University Division men's basketball season began in December 1970, progressed through the regular season and conference tournaments, and concluded with the 1971 NCAA University Division basketball tournament championship game on March 27, 1971, at the Astrodome in Houston, Texas. The UCLA Bruins won their seventh NCAA national championship with a 68–62 victory over the Villanova Wildcats.

== Season headlines ==
- The NCAA introduced a new rule prohibiting any team which turned down an invitation to the NCAA tournament from playing in any other postseason tournament. The effect of the rule is to prevent NCAA Tournament invitees from accepting a National Invitation Tournament instead, diminishing the quality of the pool of teams eligible to play in the NIT.
- UCLA won its fifth NCAA championship in a row, seventh overall, and seventh in eight seasons. In the Pacific 8 Conference, it also won its fifth of what ultimately would be 13 consecutive conference titles.

== Season outlook ==
=== Pre-season polls ===
The Top 20 from the AP Poll and Coaches Poll during the pre-season.

Associated Press
Ranking	Team
1	UCLA
2	South Carolina
3	Kentucky
4	Jacksonville
5	Notre Dame
6	Marquette
7	USC
8	Villanova
9	Western Kentucky
10	Drake
11	Penn
12	Utah State
13	Duke
14	Kansas
15	New Mexico State
16	Indiana
17	Houston
18	Long Beach State
19	NC State
20	St. Bonaventure

UPI Coaches
Ranking	Team
1	UCLA
2	South Carolina
3	Jacksonville
4	Kentucky
5	Marquette
6	Notre Dame
7	Penn
8	Western Kentucky
9	Utah State
10	USC
11	Kansas
12	Indiana
13	Villanova
14	Florida State
15	Long Beach State
16 (tie)	Drake
16 (tie)	Utah
18	Kansas State
19	Duke
20	Illinois

== Conference membership changes ==
School	Former conference	New conference
Boise State Broncos	non-University Division	Big Sky Conference
Cincinnati Bearcats	Missouri Valley Conference	University Division independent
Drexel Dragons	non-University Division	Middle Atlantic Conference
George Washington Colonials	Southern Conference	University Division independent
Hawaii Rainbow Warriors	non-University Division	University Division independent
New Mexico State Aggies	University Division independent	Missouri Valley Conference
Northern Arizona Lumberjacks	non-University Division	Big Sky Conference
West Texas State Buffaloes	University Division independent	Missouri Valley Conference

== Regular season ==
=== Conferences ===
==== Conference winners and tournaments ====
Conference	Regular season winner	Conference player of the year	Conference tournament	Tournament venue (City)	Tournament winner
Atlantic Coast Conference	North Carolina	Charlie Davis, Wake Forest	1971 ACC men's basketball tournament	Greensboro Coliseum (Greensboro, North Carolina)	South Carolina
Big Eight Conference	Kansas	Cliff Meely, Colorado, & Dave Robisch, Kansas	No Tournament		
Big Sky Conference	Weber State	None selected	No Tournament		
Big Ten Conference	Ohio State	None selected	No Tournament		
Ivy League	Penn	None selected	No Tournament		
Mid-American Conference	Ohio	Ken Kowall, Ohio	No Tournament		
Middle Atlantic Conference	Saint Joseph's (East); Lafayette (West)		No Tournament		
Missouri Valley Conference	Drake, Louisville, & Saint Louis	Jeff Halliburton, Drake	Drake		
Ohio Valley Conference	Western Kentucky	Jim McDaniels, Western Kentucky	No Tournament		
Pacific 8 Conference	UCLA	None selected	No Tournament		
Pacific Coast Athletic Association	Long Beach State	George Trapp, Long Beach State	No Tournament		
Southeastern Conference	Kentucky	Johnny Neumann, Mississippi	No Tournament		
Southern Conference	Davidson	Jim Gregory, East Carolina, & Tom Jasper, William & Mary	1971 Southern Conference men's basketball tournament	Charlotte Coliseum (Charlotte, North Carolina)	East Carolina
Southland Conference	Arkansas State	Luke Adams, Lamar, & Allan Pruett, Arkansas State	No Tournament		
Southwest Conference	TCU	Goo Kennedy, TCU	No Tournament		
West Coast Athletic Conference	Pacific	John Gianelli, Pacific	No Tournament		
Western Athletic Conference	BYU	None selected	No Tournament		
Yankee Conference	Massachusetts	None selected	No Tournament		

==== Conference standings ====
1970–71 ACC men's basketball standings
	Conf.				Overall
Team	W		L	PCT	W		L	PCT
No. 13 North Carolina	11	–	3	.786	26	–	6	.813
No. 6 South Carolina †	10	–	4	.714	23	–	6	.793
Duke	9	–	5	.643	20	–	10	.667
Wake Forest	7	–	7	.500	16	–	10	.615
Virginia	6	–	8	.429	15	–	11	.577
NC State	5	–	9	.357	13	–	14	.481
Maryland	5	–	9	.357	14	–	12	.538
Clemson	3	–	11	.214	9	–	17	.346
† 1971 ACC tournament winner Rankings from AP Poll

1970–71 Big Eight Conference men's basketball standings
	Conf.				Overall
Team	W		L	PCT	W		L	PCT
No. 4 Kansas	14	–	0	1.000	27	–	3	.900
Oklahoma	9	–	5	.643	19	–	8	.704
Missouri	9	–	5	.643	17	–	9	.654
Nebraska	8	–	6	.571	18	–	8	.692
Colorado	6	–	8	.429	14	–	12	.538
Kansas State	6	–	8	.429	11	–	15	.423
Oklahoma State	2	–	12	.143	7	–	19	.269
Iowa State	2	–	12	.143	5	–	21	.192
Rankings from AP Poll

1970–71 Big Sky men's basketball standings
	Conf.				Overall
Team	W		L	PCT	W		L	PCT
Weber State	12	–	2	.857	21	–	6	.778
Idaho	8	–	6	.571	14	–	11	.560
Montana State	8	–	6	.571	10	–	13	.435
Idaho State	7	–	7	.500	9	–	15	.375
Gonzaga	6	–	8	.429	12	–	13	.480
Montana	6	–	8	.429	8	–	16	.333
Boise State	5	–	9	.357	10	–	16	.385
Northern Arizona	4	–	10	.286	6	–	19	.240

1970–71 Big Ten Conference men's basketball standings
	Conf.				Overall
Team	W		L	PCT	W		L	PCT
No. 10 Ohio State	13	–	1	.929	20	–	6	.769
Michigan	12	–	2	.857	19	–	7	.731
Purdue	11	–	3	.786	18	–	7	.720
Indiana	9	–	5	.643	17	–	7	.708
Illinois	5	–	9	.357	11	–	12	.478
Minnesota	5	–	9	.357	11	–	13	.458
Michigan State	4	–	10	.286	10	–	14	.417
Iowa	4	–	10	.286	9	–	15	.375
Wisconsin	4	–	10	.286	9	–	15	.375
Northwestern	3	–	11	.214	7	–	17	.292
Rankings from AP Poll

1970–71 Ivy League men's basketball standings
	Conf.				Overall
Team	W		L	PCT	W		L	PCT
No. 3 Pennsylvania	14	–	0	1.000	28	–	1	.966
Harvard	11	–	3	.786	16	–	10	.615
Columbia	9	–	5	.643	15	–	9	.625
Princeton	9	–	5	.643	14	–	11	.560
Brown	5	–	9	.357	10	–	15	.400
Dartmouth	5	–	9	.357	10	–	16	.385
Yale	2	–	12	.143	4	–	20	.167
Cornell	1	–	13	.071	5	–	21	.192
Rankings from AP Poll

1970–71 Mid-American Conference men's basketball standings
	Conf.				Overall
Team	W		L	PCT	W		L	PCT
Miami (Ohio)	9	–	1	.900	20	–	5	.800
Ohio	6	–	4	.600	17	–	7	.708
Western Michigan	5	–	5	.500	14	–	10	.583
Kent State	4	–	6	.400	13	–	11	.542
Toledo	4	–	6	.400	13	–	11	.542
Bowling Green State	2	–	8	.200	7	–	18	.280
Rankings from AP Poll

1970–71 MAC men's basketball standings
	Conf.				Overall
Team	W		L	PCT	W		L	PCT
University–Eastern
Saint Joseph's†	6	–	0	1.000	19	–	9	.679
La Salle	5	–	1	.833	20	–	7	.741
Hofstra	4	–	2	.667	16	–	8	.667
Temple	3	–	3	.500	13	–	12	.520
American	2	–	4	.333	13	–	12	.520
West Chester	1	–	5	.167	7	–	18	.280
Drexel	0	–	6	.000	7	–	17	.292
University–Western
Lafayette	9	–	1	.900	17	–	9	.654
Rider	8	–	2	.800	20	–	6	.769
Delaware	5	–	5	.500	11	–	14	.440
Bucknell	4	–	6	.400	9	–	14	.391
Lehigh	4	–	6	.400	10	–	16	.385
Gettysburg	0	–	10	.000	4	–	21	.160
† 1971 MAC men's basketball tournament winner Rankings from AP Poll

1970–71 Missouri Valley Conference men's basketball standings
	Conf.				Overall
Team	W		L	PCT	W		L	PCT
No. 18 Drake	9	–	5	.643	21	–	8	.724
Louisville	9	–	5	.643	20	–	9	.690
Saint Louis	9	–	5	.643	17	–	12	.586
Memphis State	8	–	6	.571	18	–	8	.692
Tulsa	8	–	6	.571	17	–	9	.654
Bradley	6	–	8	.429	13	–	12	.520
North Texas State	4	–	10	.286	10	–	15	.400
Wichita State	3	–	11	.214	10	–	16	.385
West Texas State		–		–	19	–	7	.731
New Mexico State		–		–	19	–	8	.704
Rankings from AP Poll

1970–71 Ohio Valley Conference men's basketball standings
	Conf.				Overall
Team	W		L	PCT	W		L	PCT
No. 7 Western Kentucky	12	–	2	.857	24	–	6	.800
Murray State	10	–	4	.714	19	–	5	.792
Eastern Kentucky	10	–	4	.714	16	–	8	.667
East Tennessee State	8	–	6	.571	12	–	12	.500
Austin Peay State	5	–	9	.357	10	–	14	.417
Morehead State	4	–	10	.286	8	–	17	.320
Tennessee Tech	4	–	10	.286	7	–	17	.292
Middle Tennessee	3	–	11	.214	11	–	15	.423
Rankings from AP Poll

1970–71 Pacific-8 Conference men's basketball standings
	Conf.				Overall
Team	W		L	PCT	W		L	PCT
No. 1 UCLA	14	–	0	1.000	29	–	1	.967
No. 5 USC	12	–	2	.857	24	–	2	.923
Oregon	8	–	6	.571	17	–	9	.654
California	8	–	6	.571	16	–	9	.640
Washington	6	–	8	.429	15	–	13	.536
Oregon State	4	–	10	.286	12	–	14	.462
Washington State	2	–	12	.143	12	–	14	.462
Stanford	2	–	12	.143	6	–	20	.231
As of 1971; Rankings from AP Poll

1970–71 Pacific Coast Athletic Association men's basketball standings
	Conf.				Overall
Team	W		L	PCT	W		L	PCT
No. 16 Long Beach State*	10	–	0	1.000	24	–	5	.828
UC Santa Barbara	8	–	2	.800	20	–	6	.769
Cal State Los Angeles	5	–	5	.500	15	–	11	.577
Fresno State	4	–	6	.400	15	–	11	.577
San Diego State	3	–	7	.300	12	–	14	.462
San Jose State	0	–	10	.000	2	–	24	.077
* – Overall record adjusted to 22–4; Rankings from AP Poll

1970–71 Southeastern Conference men's basketball standings
	Conf.				Overall
Team	W		L	PCT	W		L	PCT
No. 8 Kentucky	16	–	2	.889	22	–	6	.786
No. 17 Tennessee	13	–	5	.722	21	–	7	.750
LSU	10	–	8	.556	14	–	12	.538
Mississippi State	9	–	9	.500	15	–	10	.600
Vanderbilt	9	–	9	.500	13	–	13	.500
Auburn	8	–	10	.444	11	–	15	.423
Florida	8	–	10	.444	11	–	15	.423
Ole Miss	6	–	12	.333	11	–	15	.423
Alabama	6	–	12	.333	10	–	16	.385
Georgia	5	–	13	.278	6	–	19	.240
Rankings from AP Poll

1970–71 Southern Conference men's basketball standings
	Conf.				Overall
Team	W		L	PCT	W		L	PCT
Davidson	9	–	1	.900	15	–	11	.577
William & Mary	7	–	3	.700	11	–	16	.407
East Carolina	7	–	4	.636	13	–	12	.520
The Citadel	6	–	5	.545	13	–	12	.520
Furman †	5	–	5	.500	15	–	12	.556
Richmond	3	–	9	.250	7	–	21	.250
VMI	1	–	11	.083	1	–	25	.038
† Southern Conference Tournament winner Rankings from AP Poll

1970–71 Southland Conference men's basketball standings
	Conf.				Overall
Team	W		L	PCT	W		L	PCT
Arkansas State	6	–	2	.750	15	–	9	.625
Abilene Christian	5	–	3	.625	15	–	9	.625
Lamar	5	–	3	.625	11	–	13	.458
Texas-Arlington	3	–	5	.375	8	–	18	.308
Trinity (Tex.)	1	–	7	.125	5	–	16	.238
Rankings from AP Poll

1970–71 Southwest Conference men's basketball standings
	Conf.				Overall
Team	W		L	PCT	W		L	PCT
TCU	11	–	3	.786	15	–	12	.556
Baylor	10	–	4	.714	18	–	8	.692
Texas Tech	9	–	5	.643	16	–	10	.615
SMU	8	–	6	.571	16	–	10	.615
Rice	6	–	8	.429	14	–	12	.538
Texas	6	–	8	.429	12	–	12	.500
Texas A&M	5	–	9	.357	9	–	17	.346
Arkansas	1	–	13	.071	5	–	21	.192
Rankings from AP Poll

1970-71 WCAC men's basketball standings
	Conf.				Overall
Team	W		L	PCT	W		L	PCT
Pacific	12	–	2	.857	22	–	6	.786
Loyola (Calif.)	10	–	4	.714	15	–	10	.600
UNLV	9	–	5	.643	16	–	10	.615
Santa Clara	8	–	6	.571	11	–	15	.423
San Francisco	8	–	6	.571	10	–	16	.385
Pepperdine	4	–	10	.286	12	–	13	.480
Saint Mary's	4	–	10	.286	10	–	16	.385
Nevada	1	–	13	.071	3	–	23	.115
Rankings from AP Poll

1970–71 WAC men's basketball standings
	Conf.				Overall
Team	W		L	PCT	W		L	PCT
BYU	10	–	4	.714	18	–	11	.621
UTEP	9	–	5	.643	15	–	10	.600
Utah	9	–	5	.643	15	–	11	.577
Arizona State	8	–	6	.571	16	–	10	.615
Colorado State	7	–	7	.500	15	–	10	.600
Wyoming	6	–	8	.429	10	–	15	.400
New Mexico	4	–	10	.286	14	–	12	.538
Arizona	3	–	11	.214	10	–	16	.385
Rankings from AP Poll

1970–71 Yankee Conference men's basketball standings
	Conf.				Overall
Team	W		L	PCT	W		L	PCT
Massachusetts	10	–	0	1.000	23	–	4	.852
Rhode Island	8	–	2	.800	10	–	17	.370
Connecticut	5	–	5	.500	10	–	14	.417
New Hampshire	3	–	7	.300	11	–	12	.478
Maine	3	–	7	.300	8	–	16	.333
Vermont	1	–	9	.100	9	–	15	.375

=== University Division independents ===
A total of 62 college teams played as University Division independents. Among them, Marquette (28–1) had both the best winning percentage (.966) and the most wins.

1970–71 NCAA University Division men's basketball independents standings
	Conf.				Overall
Team	W		L	PCT	W		L	PCT
No. 2 Marquette		–		–	28	–	1	.966
No. 9 Fordham		–		–	26	–	3	.897
No. 11 Jacksonville		–		–	22	–	4	.846
No. 15 Duquesne		–		–	21	–	4	.840
Hawaii		–		–	23	–	5	.821
No. 19 Villanova		–		–	27	–	7	.794
St. Bonaventure		–		–	21	–	6	.778
No. 14 Houston		–		–	22	–	7	.759
Utah State		–		–	20	–	7	.741
Syracuse		–		–	19	–	7	.731
Georgia Tech		–		–	23	–	9	.719
Providence		–		–	20	–	8	.714
Fairleigh Dickinson		–		–	16	–	7	.696
Rutgers		–		–	16	–	7	.696
Holy Cross		–		–	18	–	8	.692
No. 12 Notre Dame		–		–	20	–	9	.690
Dayton		–		–	18	–	9	.667
St. John's (NY)		–		–	18	–	9	.667
Denver		–		–	17	–	9	.654
Florida State		–		–	17	–	9	.654
Loyola (LA)		–		–	16	–	10	.615
Marshall		–		–	16	–	10	.615
Colgate		–		–	15	–	10	.600
Saint Francis (PA)		–		–	15	–	10	.600
Pittsburgh		–		–	14	–	10	.583
Boston College		–		–	15	–	11	.577
Northern Illinois		–		–	13	–	10	.565
Southern Illinois		–		–	13	–	10	.565
Creighton		–		–	14	–	11	.560
Virginia Tech		–		–	14	–	11	.560
Manhattan		–		–	13	–	11	.542
Cincinnati		–		–	14	–	12	.538
Detroit		–		–	14	–	12	.538
Niagara		–		–	14	–	12	.538
West Virginia		–		–	13	–	12	.520
Centenary		–		–	13	–	13	.500
Pan American		–		–	13	–	13	.500
Navy		–		–	12	–	12	.500
Air Force		–		–	12	–	14	.462
Georgetown		–		–	12	–	14	.462
Seattle		–		–	12	–	14	.462
Army		–		–	11	–	13	.458
Saint Peter's		–		–	11	–	13	.458
Iona		–		–	10	–	12	.455
Penn State		–		–	10	–	12	.455
George Washington		–		–	11	–	14	.440
Seton Hall		–		–	11	–	15	.423
Long Island		–		–	10	–	15	.400
Butler		–		–	10	–	16	.385
Canisius		–		–	8	–	13	.381
Fairfield		–		–	9	–	15	.375
Hardin–Simmons		–		–	9	–	16	.360
Oklahoma City		–		–	9	–	16	.360
Xavier		–		–	9	–	17	.346
DePaul		–		–	8	–	17	.320
St. Francis (NY)		–		–	8	–	17	.320
Tulane		–		–	8	–	18	.308
Boston University		–		–	7	–	18	.280
Miami (FL)		–		–	7	–	19	.269
NYU		–		–	5	–	20	.200
Portland		–		–	5	–	21	.192
Loyola (IL)		–		–	4	–	20	.167
Rankings from AP Poll

=== Informal championships ===
Conference	Regular season winner	Most Valuable Player
Philadelphia Big 5	Penn	Ken Durrett, La Salle

Penn finished with a 4–0 record in head-to-head competition among the Philadelphia Big 5.

== Postseason tournaments ==
=== NCAA tournament ===
==== Final Four ====
National semifinals
E	Villanova	92
ME	Western Kentucky	89
MW	Kansas	60
W	UCLA	68

National finals
E	Villanova	62
W	UCLA	68
Third place
ME	Western Kentucky	77
MW	Kansas	75

=== National Invitation tournament ===
==== Semifinals & finals ====
Semifinals
North Carolina	73
Duke	69
Georgia Tech	76
St. Bonaventure	71

Finals
North Carolina	84
Georgia Tech	66
Third place
Duke	88
St. Bonaventure	92

== Awards ==
=== Consensus All-American teams ===
Consensus First Team
Player	Position	Class	Team
Austin Carr	G	Senior	Notre Dame
Artis Gilmore	C	Senior	Jacksonville
Jim McDaniels	C	Senior	Western Kentucky
Dean Meminger	G	Senior	Marquette
Sidney Wicks	F	Senior	UCLA

Consensus Second Team
Player	Position	Class	Team
Ken Durrett	F	Senior	La Salle
Johnny Neumann	F	Sophomore	Mississippi
Howard Porter	F	Senior	Villanova
John Roche	G	Senior	South Carolina
Curtis Rowe	F	Senior	UCLA

=== Major player of the year awards ===
- Naismith Award: Austin Carr, Notre Dame
- Helms Player of the Year: Austin Carr, Notre Dame, & Sidney Wicks, UCLA
- Associated Press Player of the Year: Austin Carr, Notre Dame
- UPI Player of the Year: Austin Carr, Notre Dame
- Oscar Robertson Trophy (USBWA): Sidney Wicks, UCLA
- Sporting News Player of the Year: Sidney Wicks, UCLA

=== Major coach of the year awards ===
- Associated Press Coach of the Year: Al McGuire, Marquette
- Henry Iba Award (USBWA): John Wooden, UCLA
- NABC Coach of the Year: Jack Kraft, Villanova
- UPI Coach of the Year: Al McGuire, Marquette
- Sporting News Coach of the Year: Al McGuire, Marquette

=== Other major awards ===
- Frances Pomeroy Naismith Award (Best player under 6'0): Charles Johnson, California
- Robert V. Geasey Trophy (Top player in Philadelphia Big 5): Ken Durrett, La Salle
- NIT/Haggerty Award (Top player in New York City metro area): Charlie Yelverton, Fordham

== Coaching changes ==
A number of teams changed coaches during the season and after it ended.

Team	Former Coach	Interim Coach	New Coach	Reason
Air Force	Bob Spear		Hank Egan	Egan was an assistant under Spear.
Army	Bob Knight		Dan Dougherty	Knight left to coach Indiana.
Austin Peay State	George Fisher		Lake Kelly	
Boston College	Chuck Daly		Bob Zuffelato	Daly left to coach Penn.
Boston University	Charlie Luce		Ron Mitchell	Luce left to be athletic director.
Bowling Green State	Bob Conibear		Pat Haley	
The Citadel	Dick Campbell		George Hill	
Delaware	Dan Peterson		Donal Harnum	
Drake	Maury John		Howard tacey	Maury left to coach at Iowa State.
Drexel	Frank Szymanski		Ray Haesler	
Fordham	Digger Phelps		Hal Wissel	Phelps left to coach Notre Dame.
Idaho State	Dan Miller		Jim Killingworth	
Indiana	Lou Watson		Bob Knight	
Iowa State	Glen Anderson		Maury John	
Lafayette	Hal Wissel		Tom Davis	Wissel left to coach Fordham.
Louisville	John Dromo	Howard Stacey	Denny Crum	
Maine	Gil Philbrick		Skip Chappelle	
Marshall	Stewart Way		Carl Tacy	
Minnesota	George Hanson		Bill Musselman	Hanson resigned after one season going 11–13.
Montana	Lou Rocheleau		Jud Heathcote	
North Texas State	Harry Miller		Gene Robbins	Miller left to coach at Wichita State.
Notre Dame	John Dee		Digger Phelps	
Oregon	Steve Belko		Dick Harter	
Penn	Dick Harter		Chuck Daly	Harter left to coach Florida.
Rutgers	Bill Foster		Dick Lloyd	
Saint Francis (PA)	John Hiller		Dick Conover	
San Jose State	Dan Glines		Ivan Guevara	
Texas Tech	Bob Bass	Gerald Myers		
Tulane	Ralph Pedersen		Dick Longo	
Utah	Jack Gardner		Bill Foster	
Utah State	Ladell Anderson		T. L. Plain	
Virginia Tech	Howie Shannon		Don DeVoe	
Washington	Tex Winter		Marv Harshman	
Washington State	Marv Harshman		Bob Greenwood	
Weber State	Phil Johnson		Gene Visscher	Johnson left to be an assistant with the Chicago Bulls. Visscher was an assistant under Johnson.
Western Kentucky	John Oldman		Jim Richards	
Wichita State	Gary Thompson		Harry Miller	
Xavier	George Krajack		Dick Campbell	
