= ACC men's basketball tournament =

Postseason conference tournament

- Conference basketball championship
- Sport: Basketball
- Conference: Atlantic Coast Conference
- Number of teams: 15
- Format: Single-elimination tournament
- Current stadium: Rotates – Spectrum Center in 2025 & 2026
- Current location: Rotates – Charlotte, North Carolina, in 2025 & 2026
- Played: 1954–present
- Last contest: 2026
- Current champion: Duke
- Most championships: Duke Blue Devils (24)
- TV partner(s): ESPN, ACCN
- Official website: TheACC.com Men's Basketball

The ACC men's basketball tournament (popularly known as the ACC tournament) is the conference championship tournament in men's basketball for the Atlantic Coast Conference (ACC). It has been held every year since the ACC's first basketball season concluded in 1954 (with the 2020 tournament only being partially completed due to the COVID-19 pandemic). The ACC tournament is a single-elimination tournament and seeding is based on regular season records. The winner, declared conference champion, receives the conference's automatic bid to the NCAA men's tournament.

== Tournament champions ==
Since July 1, 1961, the ACC's bylaws have included the phrase "and the winner shall be the conference champion" in referring to the tournament, meaning that the conference tournament winner is the only champion of the ACC.

Year	Champion	Score	Runner-up	Tournament MVP	Location	City
1954	NC State	82–80 (OT)	Wake Forest	Dickie Hemric	Reynolds Coliseum	Raleigh, North Carolina
1955	NC State	87–77	Duke	Ron Shavlik	Reynolds Coliseum	Raleigh, North Carolina
1956	NC State	76–54	Wake Forest	Vic Molodet	Reynolds Coliseum	Raleigh, North Carolina
1957	North Carolina	95–75	South Carolina	Lennie Rosenbluth	Reynolds Coliseum	Raleigh, North Carolina
1958	Maryland	86–75	North Carolina	Nick Davis	Reynolds Coliseum	Raleigh, North Carolina
1959	NC State	80–56	North Carolina	Lou Pucillo	Reynolds Coliseum	Raleigh, North Carolina
1960	Duke	64–59	Wake Forest	Doug Kistler	Reynolds Coliseum	Raleigh, North Carolina
1961	Wake Forest	96–81	Duke	Len Chappell	Reynolds Coliseum	Raleigh, North Carolina
1962	Wake Forest	77–68	Clemson	Len Chappell	Reynolds Coliseum	Raleigh, North Carolina
1963	Duke	71–66	Wake Forest	Art Heyman	Reynolds Coliseum	Raleigh, North Carolina
1964	Duke	80–59	Wake Forest	Jeff Mullins	Reynolds Coliseum	Raleigh, North Carolina
1965	NC State	91–85	Duke	Larry Worsley	Reynolds Coliseum	Raleigh, North Carolina
1966	Duke	71–66	NC State	Steve Vacendak	Reynolds Coliseum	Raleigh, North Carolina
1967	North Carolina	82–73	Duke	Larry Miller	Greensboro Coliseum	Greensboro, North Carolina
1968	North Carolina	87–50	NC State	Larry Miller	Charlotte Coliseum (Independence) (Note: The original Charlotte Coliseum on Independence Boulevard opened in 1956 and closed in 1988 when the Charlotte Coliseum on Tyvola Road opened. It reopened in 1993 as Independence Arena. Cricket Wireless held naming rights from 2001 to 2006, and Bojangles has held naming rights since 2008.)	Charlotte, North Carolina
1969	North Carolina	85–74	Duke	Charlie Scott	Charlotte Coliseum (Independence)	Charlotte, North Carolina
1970	NC State	42–39 (2OT)	South Carolina	Vann Williford	Charlotte Coliseum (Independence)	Charlotte, North Carolina
1971	South Carolina	52–51	North Carolina	John Roche	Greensboro Coliseum	Greensboro, North Carolina
1972	North Carolina	73–64	Maryland	Bob McAdoo	Greensboro Coliseum	Greensboro, North Carolina
1973	NC State	76–74	Maryland	Tommy Burleson	Greensboro Coliseum	Greensboro, North Carolina
1974	NC State	103–100 (OT)	Maryland	Tommy Burleson	Greensboro Coliseum	Greensboro, North Carolina
1975	North Carolina	70–66	NC State	Phil Ford	Greensboro Coliseum	Greensboro, North Carolina
1976	Virginia	67–62	North Carolina	Wally Walker	Capital Centre	Landover, Maryland
1977	North Carolina	75–69	Virginia	John Kuester	Greensboro Coliseum	Greensboro, North Carolina
1978	Duke	85–77	Wake Forest	Jim Spanarkel	Greensboro Coliseum	Greensboro, North Carolina
1979	North Carolina	71–63	Duke	Dudley Bradley	Greensboro Coliseum	Greensboro, North Carolina
1980	Duke	73–72	Maryland	Albert King	Greensboro Coliseum	Greensboro, North Carolina
1981	North Carolina	61–60	Maryland	Sam Perkins	Capital Centre	Landover, Maryland
1982	North Carolina	47–45	Virginia	James Worthy	Greensboro Coliseum	Greensboro, North Carolina
1983	NC State	81–78	Virginia	Sidney Lowe	The Omni	Atlanta, Georgia
1984	Maryland	74–62	Duke	Len Bias	Greensboro Coliseum	Greensboro, North Carolina
1985	Georgia Tech	57–54	North Carolina	Mark Price	The Omni	Atlanta, Georgia
1986	Duke	68–67	Georgia Tech	Johnny Dawkins	Greensboro Coliseum	Greensboro, North Carolina
1987	NC State	68–67	North Carolina	Vinny Del Negro	Capital Centre	Landover, Maryland
1988	Duke	65–61	North Carolina	Danny Ferry	Greensboro Coliseum	Greensboro, North Carolina
1989	North Carolina	77–74	Duke	J.R. Reid	The Omni	Atlanta, Georgia
1990	Georgia Tech	70–61	Virginia	Brian Oliver	Charlotte Coliseum (Tyvola) (Note: The second Charlotte Coliseum on Tyvola Road opened in 1988 and closed in 2005 after the construction of a new arena in Uptown Charlotte. It was demolished in 2007.)	Charlotte, North Carolina
1991	North Carolina	96–74	Duke	Rick Fox	Charlotte Coliseum (Tyvola)	Charlotte, North Carolina
1992	Duke	94–74	North Carolina	Christian Laettner	Charlotte Coliseum (Tyvola)	Charlotte, North Carolina
1993	Georgia Tech	77–75	North Carolina	James Forrest	Charlotte Coliseum (Tyvola)	Charlotte, North Carolina
1994	North Carolina	73–66	Virginia	Jerry Stackhouse	Charlotte Coliseum (Tyvola)	Charlotte, North Carolina
1995	Wake Forest	82–80 (OT)	North Carolina	Randolph Childress	Greensboro Coliseum	Greensboro, North Carolina
1996	Wake Forest	75–74	Georgia Tech	Tim Duncan	Greensboro Coliseum	Greensboro, North Carolina
1997	North Carolina	64–54	NC State	Shammond Williams	Greensboro Coliseum	Greensboro, North Carolina
1998	North Carolina	83–68	Duke	Antawn Jamison	Greensboro Coliseum	Greensboro, North Carolina
1999	Duke	96–73	North Carolina	Elton Brand	Charlotte Coliseum (Tyvola)	Charlotte, North Carolina
2000	Duke	81–68	Maryland	Jay Williams	Charlotte Coliseum (Tyvola)	Charlotte, North Carolina
2001	Duke	79–53	North Carolina	Shane Battier	Georgia Dome	Atlanta, Georgia
2002	Duke	91–61	NC State	Carlos Boozer	Charlotte Coliseum (Tyvola)	Charlotte, North Carolina
2003	Duke	84–77	NC State	Daniel Ewing	Greensboro Coliseum	Greensboro, North Carolina
2004	Maryland	95–87 (OT)	Duke	John Gilchrist	Greensboro Coliseum	Greensboro, North Carolina
2005	Duke	69–64	Georgia Tech	JJ Redick	MCI Center	Washington, D.C.
2006	Duke	78–76	Boston College	JJ Redick	Greensboro Coliseum	Greensboro, North Carolina
2007	North Carolina	89–80	NC State	Brandan Wright	St. Pete Times Forum	Tampa, Florida
2008	North Carolina	86–81	Clemson	Tyler Hansbrough	Charlotte Bobcats Arena	Charlotte, North Carolina
2009	Duke	79–69	Florida State	Jon Scheyer	Georgia Dome	Atlanta, Georgia
2010	Duke	65–61	Georgia Tech	Kyle Singler	Greensboro Coliseum	Greensboro, North Carolina
2011	Duke	75–58	North Carolina	Nolan Smith	Greensboro Coliseum	Greensboro, North Carolina
2012	Florida State	85–82	North Carolina	Michael Snaer	Philips Arena	Atlanta, Georgia
2013	Miami	87–77	North Carolina	Shane Larkin	Greensboro Coliseum	Greensboro, North Carolina
2014	Virginia	72–63	Duke	Joe Harris	Greensboro Coliseum	Greensboro, North Carolina
2015	Notre Dame	90–82	North Carolina	Jerian Grant	Greensboro Coliseum	Greensboro, North Carolina
2016	North Carolina	61–57	Virginia	Joel Berry II	Verizon Center	Washington, D.C.
2017	Duke	75–69	Notre Dame	Luke Kennard	Barclays Center	Brooklyn, New York
2018	Virginia	71–63	North Carolina	Kyle Guy	Barclays Center	Brooklyn, New York
2019	Duke	73–63	Florida State	Zion Williamson	Spectrum Center	Charlotte, North Carolina
2020	Tournament not completed due to the COVID-19 pandemic. Number 1 seed Florida State appointed ACC champion.				Greensboro Coliseum	Greensboro, North Carolina
2021	Georgia Tech	80–75	Florida State	Michael Devoe	Greensboro Coliseum	Greensboro, North Carolina
2022	Virginia Tech	82–67	Duke	Hunter Cattoor	Barclays Center	Brooklyn, New York
2023	Duke	59–49	Virginia	Kyle Filipowski	Greensboro Coliseum	Greensboro, North Carolina
2024	NC State	84–76	North Carolina	D. J. Burns	Capital One Arena	Washington, D.C.
2025	Duke	73–62	Louisville	Kon Knueppel	Spectrum Center	Charlotte, North Carolina
2026	Duke	74–70	Virginia	Cameron Boozer	Spectrum Center	Charlotte, North Carolina
2027					First Horizon Coliseum	Greensboro, North Carolina
2028					Spectrum Center	Charlotte, North Carolina
2029					First Horizon Coliseum	Greensboro, North Carolina

== Venues ==
Venue	City	State	Appearances	Last	Years	Notes
First Horizon Coliseum	Greensboro	North Carolina	30	2023	1967, 1971–75, 1977–80, 1982, 1984, 1986, 1988, 1995–98, 2003–04, 2006, 2010–11, 2013–15, 2020, 2021, 2023, 2027*, 2029*	(Note: First Horizon Coliseum was known as Greensboro Coliseum when it hosted prior to 2027.)
Reynolds Coliseum	Raleigh	North Carolina	13	1966	1954–66	
Charlotte Coliseum (Tyvola Road)	Charlotte	North Carolina	8	2002	1990–94, 1999–2000, 2002	
Spectrum Center	Charlotte	North Carolina	4	2025	2008, 2019, 2025, 2026, 2028*	(Note: Spectrum Center was known as Charlotte Bobcats Arena when it served as the 2008 host. It was later known as Time Warner Cable Arena, but never hosted under that name.)
Charlotte Coliseum (Independence Boulevard)	Charlotte	North Carolina	3	1970	1968, 1969, 1970	(Note: The original Charlotte Coliseum on Independence Boulevard adopted its current name of Bojangles Coliseum in 2008. After reopening in 1993, it was also known as Independence Arena and Cricket Arena, but never hosted an ACC men's tournament under any of its later names. (It hosted the ACC women's tournament from 1997 to 1999 as Independence Arena.))
Capital Centre	Landover	Maryland	3	1987	1976, 1981, 1987	
Omni Coliseum	Atlanta	Georgia	3	1989	1983, 1985, 1989	
Capital One Arena	Washington	D.C.	3	2024	2005, 2016, 2024	(Note: Capital One Arena was known as MCI Center when it hosted in 2005 and the Verizon Center in 2016.)
Barclays Center	Brooklyn	New York	3	2022	2017, 2018, 2022	
Georgia Dome	Atlanta	Georgia	2	2009	2001, 2009	
Benchmark International Arena	Tampa	Florida	1	2007	2007	(Note: Benchmark International Arena was known as the St. Pete Times Forum when it hosted in 2007. It was originally known as the Ice Palace, and later as the Tampa Bay Times Forum and Amalie Arena, but never hosted under either name.)
State Farm Arena	Atlanta	Georgia	1	2012	2012	(Note: State Farm Arena was known as Philips Arena when it hosted in 2012.)

=== Notes ===
* Denotes the venue for a future ACC men's basketball tournament.

== Tournament championships by school ==
School	Year joined	Championships	Championship years
Duke	1953	24	1960, 1963, 1964, 1966, 1978, 1980, 1986, 1988, 1992, 1999, 2000, 2001, 2002, 2003, 2005, 2006, 2009, 2010, 2011, 2017, 2019, 2023, 2025, 2026
North Carolina	1953	18	1957, 1967, 1968, 1969, 1972, 1975, 1977, 1979, 1981, 1982, 1989, 1991, 1994, 1997, 1998, 2007, 2008, 2016
NC State	1953	11	1954, 1955, 1956, 1959, 1965, 1970, 1973^{[a]}, 1974, 1983, 1987, 2024
Wake Forest	1953	4	1961, 1962, 1995, 1996
Georgia Tech	1978	4	1985, 1990, 1993, 2021
Virginia	1953	3	1976, 2014, 2018
Maryland	1953^{[b]}	3	1958, 1984, 2004
South Carolina	1953^{[c]}	1	1971
Florida State	1991	1^{[d]}	2012
Miami	2004	1	2013
Virginia Tech	2004	1	2022
Notre Dame	2013	1	2015
Clemson	1953	0	—
Boston College	2005	0	—
Syracuse	2013	0	—
Pittsburgh	2013	0	—
Louisville	2014	0	—
California	2024	0	—
Stanford	2024	0	—
SMU	2024	0	—

== Footnotes ==
- ^{a} The 1972–73 NC State Wolfpack team was forced to skip postseason play due to an NCAA recruiting infraction. Assistant coach Eddie Biedenbach had played in a pick-up (impromptu) basketball game with David Thompson on a recruiting visit to Raleigh, North Carolina. The Wolfpack finished the season undefeated at 27–0 but forfeited the opportunity to compete for the national championship.
- ^{b} The University of Maryland, College Park, left the Atlantic Coast Conference in 2014 and is now a member of the Big Ten Conference.
- ^{c} The University of South Carolina left the Atlantic Coast Conference in 1971, and it is now a member of the Southeastern Conference.
- ^{d} After the 2020 tournament was cancelled due to the COVID-19 pandemic, the ACC automatic bid was awarded to regular season winner Florida State. There was no ACC Tournament champion that year.
