= 1970–71 Penn State Nittany Lions basketball team =

American college basketball season

1970–71 Penn State Nittany Lions men's basketball
- Conference: Independent
- Record: 10–12
- Head coach: Johnny Bach (3rd season)
- Home arena: Rec Hall

1970–71 NCAA University Division men's basketball independents standings
	Conf.				Overall
Team	W		L	PCT	W		L	PCT
No. 2 Marquette		–		–	28	–	1	.966
No. 9 Fordham		–		–	26	–	3	.897
No. 11 Jacksonville		–		–	22	–	4	.846
No. 15 Duquesne		–		–	21	–	4	.840
Hawaii		–		–	23	–	5	.821
No. 19 Villanova		–		–	27	–	7	.794
St. Bonaventure		–		–	21	–	6	.778
No. 14 Houston		–		–	22	–	7	.759
Utah State		–		–	20	–	7	.741
Syracuse		–		–	19	–	7	.731
Georgia Tech		–		–	23	–	9	.719
Providence		–		–	20	–	8	.714
Fairleigh Dickinson		–		–	16	–	7	.696
Rutgers		–		–	16	–	7	.696
Holy Cross		–		–	18	–	8	.692
No. 12 Notre Dame		–		–	20	–	9	.690
Dayton		–		–	18	–	9	.667
St. John's (NY)		–		–	18	–	9	.667
Denver		–		–	17	–	9	.654
Florida State		–		–	17	–	9	.654
Loyola (LA)		–		–	16	–	10	.615
Marshall		–		–	16	–	10	.615
Colgate		–		–	15	–	10	.600
Saint Francis (PA)		–		–	15	–	10	.600
Pittsburgh		–		–	14	–	10	.583
Boston College		–		–	15	–	11	.577
Northern Illinois		–		–	13	–	10	.565
Southern Illinois		–		–	13	–	10	.565
Creighton		–		–	14	–	11	.560
Virginia Tech		–		–	14	–	11	.560
Manhattan		–		–	13	–	11	.542
Cincinnati		–		–	14	–	12	.538
Detroit		–		–	14	–	12	.538
Niagara		–		–	14	–	12	.538
West Virginia		–		–	13	–	12	.520
Centenary		–		–	13	–	13	.500
Pan American		–		–	13	–	13	.500
Navy		–		–	12	–	12	.500
Air Force		–		–	12	–	14	.462
Georgetown		–		–	12	–	14	.462
Seattle		–		–	12	–	14	.462
Army		–		–	11	–	13	.458
Saint Peter's		–		–	11	–	13	.458
Iona		–		–	10	–	12	.455
Penn State		–		–	10	–	12	.455
George Washington		–		–	11	–	14	.440
Seton Hall		–		–	11	–	15	.423
Long Island		–		–	10	–	15	.400
Butler		–		–	10	–	16	.385
Canisius		–		–	8	–	13	.381
Fairfield		–		–	9	–	15	.375
Hardin–Simmons		–		–	9	–	16	.360
Oklahoma City		–		–	9	–	16	.360
Xavier		–		–	9	–	17	.346
DePaul		–		–	8	–	17	.320
St. Francis (NY)		–		–	8	–	17	.320
Tulane		–		–	8	–	18	.308
Boston University		–		–	7	–	18	.280
Miami (FL)		–		–	7	–	19	.269
NYU		–		–	5	–	20	.200
Portland		–		–	5	–	21	.192
Loyola (IL)		–		–	4	–	20	.167
Rankings from AP Poll

The 1970–71 Penn State Nittany Lions men's basketball team represented the Pennsylvania State University during the 1970–71 NCAA University Division men's basketball season. The team was led by 3rd-year head coach Johnny Bach, and played their home games at Rec Hall in University Park, Pennsylvania.

== Roster ==
1970–71 Penn State Nittany Lions men's basketball team
Players
Coaches

Pos.	#	Name	Height	Weight	Year	Hometown
F	13	Willie Bryant	6 ft 3 in (1.91 m)	200 lb (91 kg)	Sr	Uniontown, Pennsylvania
C	51	Ed Chubb	6 ft 7 in (2.01 m)	200 lb (91 kg)	So	Middletown, Pennsylvania
G	35	Chuck Crist	6 ft 2 in (1.88 m)	190 lb (86 kg)	Jr	Salamanca, New York
F	45	Bob Fittin	6 ft 8 in (2.03 m)	200 lb (91 kg)	Jr	Elmhurst, Illinois
G	55	Bob Hodgson	6 ft 1 in (1.85 m)	200 lb (91 kg)	Jr	West Islip, New York
G	33	Ron Kodish	6 ft 1 in (1.85 m)	185 lb (84 kg)	Jr	Lock Haven, Pennsylvania
F	31	Bill Kunze	6 ft 5 in (1.96 m)	210 lb (95 kg)	So	North Bellmore, New York
G	25	Norm Mast	6 ft 2 in (1.88 m)	160 lb (73 kg)	Jr	Fayette, Pennsylvania
G	11	Bruce Mello	6 ft 3 in (1.91 m)	180 lb (82 kg)	Sr	East Rockaway, New York
C	41	Paul Neumayer	6 ft 9 in (2.06 m)	220 lb (100 kg)	So	Baltimore, Maryland
F	43	Herb Packer	6 ft 6 in (1.98 m)	215 lb (98 kg)	So	Camp Hill, Pennsylvania
G	21	Andy Popelas	6 ft 0 in (1.83 m)	170 lb (77 kg)	Jr	Roscoe, Pennsylvania
F	53	Dan Tarr	6 ft 7 in (2.01 m)	195 lb (88 kg)	So	Gradyville, Pennsylvania
G	15	Randy Vicks	5 ft 10 in (1.78 m)	160 lb (73 kg)	So	Philadelphia, Pennsylvania

Head coach

- Johnny Bach

Assistant coach(es)

- Casper Voithofer

Legend

- (C) Team captain
- (S) Suspended
- (I) Ineligible
- (W) Walk-on
- Injured
- Current redshirt

== Schedule ==
Date time, TV	Rank^{#}	Opponent^{#}	Result	Record	Site city, state
December 2		Bucknell	W 85–55	1–0	Rec Hall; University Park, Pennsylvania
December 5		at Cornell	L 59–69	1–1	Barton Hall; Ithaca, NY
December 12		Columbia	L 63–71	1–2	Rec Hall; University Park, Pennsylvania
December 17		at Syracuse	L 81–92	1–3	Manley Field House; Syracuse, NY
December 19		Boston College	W 66–63	2–3	Rec Hall; University Park, Pennsylvania
December 29		vs. North Carolina	L 57–73	2–4	
December 30		at Duke	L 56–67	2–5	Greensboro Coliseum
January 9		Seton Hall	W 77–76	3–5	Rec Hall; University Park, Pennsylvania
January 16		at Pittsburgh	L 62–75	3–6	Fitzgerald Field House; Pittsburgh, Pennsylvania
January 20		West Virginia	L 62–71	3–7	Rec Hall; University Park, Pennsylvania
January 23		Army	W 65–48	4–7	Rec Hall; University Park, Pennsylvania
January 25		Princeton	W 70–62	5–7	Rec Hall; University Park, Pennsylvania
January 30		at Gettysburg	W 68–54	6–7	Bream Gymnasium
February 3		Syracuse	L 64–68	6–8	Rec Hall; University Park, Pennsylvania
February 6		George Washington	W 94–61	7–8	Rec Hall; University Park, Pennsylvania
February 10		at Temple	L 58–61	7–9	McGonigle Hall; Philadelphia, Pennsylvania
February 13		Navy	W 73–62	8–9	Rec Hall; University Park, Pennsylvania
February 20		Georgetown	W 84–75	9–9	Rec Hall; University Park, Pennsylvania
February 24		at West Virginia	L 89–101	9–10	WVU Coliseum; Morgantown, WV
February 27		Pittsburgh	W 71–65	10–10	Rec Hall; University Park, Pennsylvania
March 2		at Kent State	L 85–86	10–11	Memorial Athletic & Convocation Center; Kent, Ohio
March 6		at Rutgers	L 70–84	10–12	College Avenue Gymnasium
*Non-conference game. ^{#}Rankings from AP Poll. (#) Tournament seedings in parentheses.
