= Bucky Waters =

American basketball broadcaster

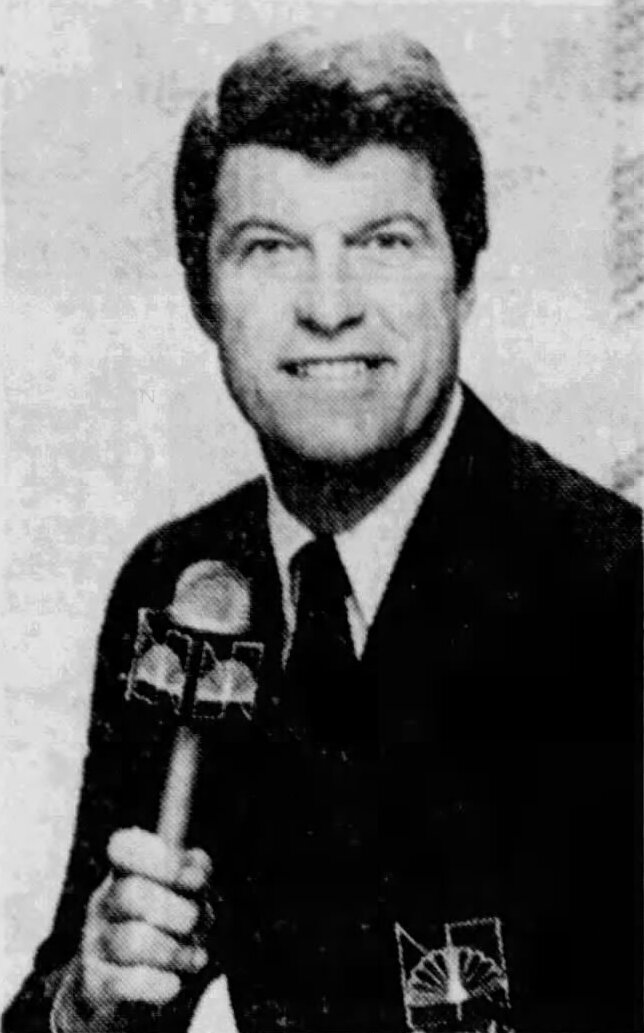
- Waters circa 1984

Biographical details
- Born: December 17, 1935 (age 90)

Playing career
- 1955–1958: NC State

Coaching career (HC unless noted)
- 1958–1959: Ashe County HS
- 1959–1965: Duke (assistant)
- 1965–1969: West Virginia
- 1969–1973: Duke

Administrative career (AD unless noted)
- 1958–1959: Ashe County HS

Head coaching record
- Overall: 133–96 (college)
- Tournaments: 0–1 (NCAA University Division); 2–4 (NIT)

Accomplishments and honors

Championships
- SoCon regular season (1967); SoCon tournament (1967)

Awards
- SoCon Coach of the Year (1967)

Raymond Chevalier "Bucky" Waters (born December 17, 1935) is an American basketball broadcaster with ESPN and Madison Square Garden Network and a retired basketball coach. He served as head basketball coach at West Virginia University from 1965 to 1969 and at Duke University from 1969 to 1973, compiling a career college basketball coaching record of record of 133–96.

Waters played basketball at Collingswood High School in Collingswood, New Jersey under coach Jack McCloskey.

== Biography ==
=== Collegiate basketball ===
As a player, Waters played under head coach Everett Case at North Carolina State University. Only NC State's national championship teams of 1974 and 1983 surpassed the Wolfpack's second-ranked team of the Waters' era.

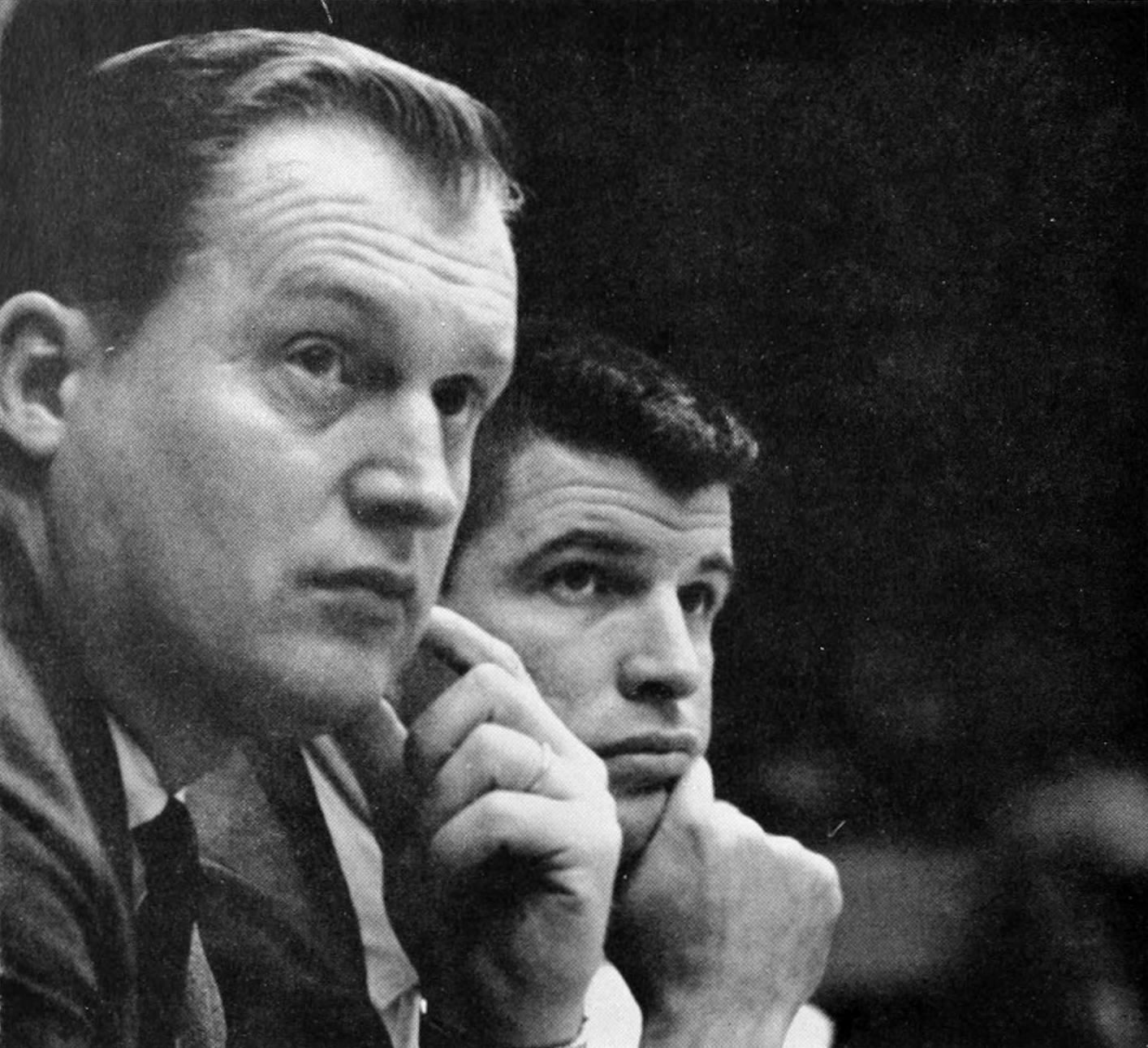
Waters (right) with Duke head coach Vic Bubas in 1965

As a coach, Waters spent four years at West Virginia University and ten years at Duke University producing winning records and postseason tournament teams at both universities. Waters is one of only four individuals in Atlantic Coast Conference (ACC) history to be on conference basketball championship teams at two different universities—first as a player at NC State (1956), then later as an assistant coach at Duke University (1960, 1963, 1964). He is also one of only six ACC players to become an ACC head basketball coach.

In the 18 years of college basketball as player and coach Waters participated in five conference championships, five NCAA tournaments, three National Invitation Tournaments, and two Final Fours. His 14th years of experience as both player and coach in the ACC found him in the top half of his conference every year. As head coach at West Virginia, Waters maintained a winning record against his former school. His Mountaineers won two of three over the Blue Devils, including a victory in 1966 over the top-ranked, undefeated Blue Devils, that went to the Final Four.

=== Broadcast experience ===
Waters broadcasting experience includes coverage with NBC, USA, ESPN, Jefferson-Pilot/Raycom, Madison Square Garden Network, and Fox Sports. His 30 years of experience includes professional golf with the PGA, professional baseball with the Durham Bulls, and anchor announcing duties for NBC in the 1988 Seoul Olympics. His most frequent and well known broadcasting, however, has been associated with college basketball.

=== Personal life ===
Waters married Dorothea Walter on September 1, 1956. They have three children (Michael, Terry, and Linda), twelve grandchildren, and three great grandsons.

== Awards ==
- 1967 Southern Conference Coach of the Year
- Recipient of NCSU Distinguished Alumnus Award in 2001, succeeding former governor, Jim Hunt
- Received honorary Doctor of Medicine (M.D.) degree from the Duke University Medical School alumni
- Inducted into South Jersey Sports Hall of Fame
- Received Lou Gehrig/Catfish Hunter Humanitarian Award in March 2005
- Retired after 41 years at Duke University, having reached title of Vice Chancellor for Alumni and Development at Duke Medical Center, and served as an officer of Duke University in that position

== Head coaching record ==
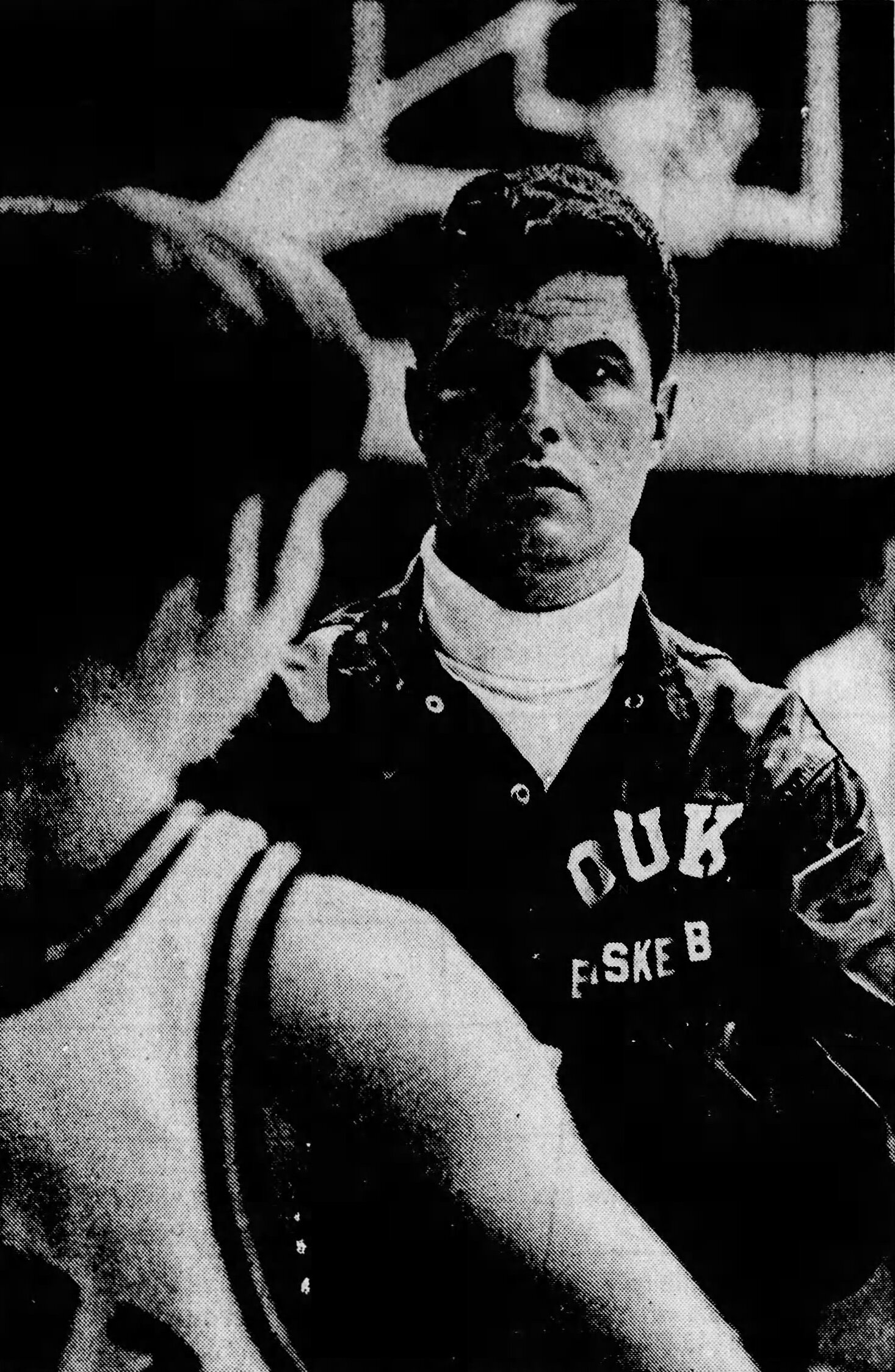
Waters at a Duke practice in 1970

Record table
Season	Team	Overall	Conference	Standing	Postseason
West Virginia Mountaineers (Southern Conference) (1965–1968)
1965–66	West Virginia	19–9	8–2	2nd	
1966–67	West Virginia	19–9	9–1	1st	NCAA University Division First Round
1967–68	West Virginia	19–9	9–2	2nd	NIT First Round
West Virginia Mountaineers (NCAA University Division independent) (1968–1969)
1968–69	West Virginia	13–14			
West Virginia:		70–41	26–5		
Duke Blue Devils (Atlantic Coast Conference) (1969–1973)
1969–70	Duke	17–9	8–6	4th	NIT First Round
1970–71	Duke	20–10	9–5	3rd	NIT Fourth Place
1971–72	Duke	14–12	6–6	T–4th	
1972–73	Duke	12–14	4–8	T–4th	
Duke:		63–55	27–25		
Total:		133–96			
National champion Postseason invitational champion Conference regular season champion Conference regular season and conference tournament champion Division regular season champion Division regular season and conference tournament champion Conference tournament champion
