= 1968–69 Drexel Dragons men's basketball team =

American college basketball season

1968–69 Drexel Dragons men's basketball
- Conference: Middle Atlantic Conferences
- Record: 8–11 (6–7 MAC)
- Head coach: Frank Szymanski (1st season)
- Home arena: Sayre High School

The 1968–69 Drexel Dragons men's basketball team represented Drexel Institute of Technology during the 1968–69 men's basketball season. The Dragons, led by 1st year head coach Frank Szymanski, played their home games at Sayre High School and were members of the Middle Atlantic Conferences (MAC).

The team finished the season 8–11.

On April 8, 1968, Frank Szymanski was named the team's new head coach.

== Roster ==
1968–69 Drexel Dragons men's basketball team
Players	Coaches
Pos. / # / Name / Height / Weight / Year / Previous school / Hometown; / / / — / —	Head coach: Frank Szymanski; Assistant coach(es) Legend: (C) Team captain; (S) Suspended; (I) Ineligible; (W) Walk-on; Injured; Current redshirt

== Schedule ==
Date time, TV	Rank^{#}	Opponent^{#}	Result	Record	High points	High rebounds	High assists	Site (attendance) city, state
Regular season
Unknown		Delaware Valley	L 62–70	0–1 (0–1)	–	–	–	
Unknown		Pennsylvania Military College	L 45–54	0–2 (0–2)	–	–	–	
December 20, 1968		Lebanon Valley	W 89–60	1–2 (1–2)	–	–	–	Sayre High School; Philadelphia, PA
Unknown*		vs. Millersville ? semifinal	L 77–86	1–3	–	–	–	
Unknown*		vs. King's Point ? 3rd place game	L 78–80	1–4	–	–	–	
Unknown*		Delaware	L 68–70	1–5	–	–	–	
Unknown		West Chester	W 68–59	2–5	–	–	–	
January 14, 1969		at Swarthmore	W 71–56	3–5 (2–2)	–	–	–	
Unknown		Moravian	L 70–73	3–6 (2–3)	–	–	–	
Unknown		Muhlenberg	L 70–92	3–7 (2–4)	–	–	–	
Unknown		Upsala	L 67–79	3–8 (2–5)	–	–	–	
Unknown*		Rider	L 52–66	3–9	–	–	–	
Unknown*		Delaware	W 67–62	4–9	–	–	–	
January 29, 1969		Haverford	W 71–65	5–9 (3–5)	–	–	–	Philadelphia, PA
February 8, 1969		at Johns Hopkins	W 60–56	6–9 (4–5)	–	–	–	
Unknown		Wagner	L 69–95	6–10 (4–6)	–	–	–	
Unknown		Scranton	L 70–74 ^{OT}	6–11 (4–7)	–	–	–	
Unknown		Ursinus	W 77–63	7–11 (5–7)	–	–	–	
February 22, 1969		Franklin & Marshall	W 84–78	8–11 (6–7)	–	–	–	Sayre High School; Philadelphia, PA
*Non-conference game. ^{#}Rankings from AP. (#) Tournament seedings in parentheses. All times are in Eastern Time.
