= 1971 ACC men's basketball tournament =

- Classification: Division I
- Season: 1970–71
- Teams: 8
- Site: Greensboro Coliseum; Greensboro, North Carolina
- Champions: South Carolina (1st title)
- Winning coach: Frank McGuire (2nd title)
- MVP: Lee Dedmon (North Carolina); John Roche (South Carolina)

1970–71 ACC men's basketball standings
	Conf.				Overall
Team	W		L	PCT	W		L	PCT
No. 13 North Carolina	11	–	3	.786	26	–	6	.813
No. 6 South Carolina †	10	–	4	.714	23	–	6	.793
Duke	9	–	5	.643	20	–	10	.667
Wake Forest	7	–	7	.500	16	–	10	.615
Virginia	6	–	8	.429	15	–	11	.577
NC State	5	–	9	.357	13	–	14	.481
Maryland	5	–	9	.357	14	–	12	.538
Clemson	3	–	11	.214	9	–	17	.346
† 1971 ACC tournament winner Rankings from AP Poll

The 1971 Atlantic Coast Conference men's basketball tournament was held in Greensboro, North Carolina, at the Greensboro Coliseum from March 11–13. South Carolina defeated North Carolina, 52–51, to win the championship. This was the only ACC Tournament that South Carolina won and the last ACC Tournament in which they played. Lee Dedmon of North Carolina and John Roche of South Carolina tied as tournament MVPs. In the final, 6'3" Kevin Joyce out-jumped 6"10" Dedmon with seconds remaining to tap the ball to Tom Owens, who was left alone under the basket. Owens made the layup to give South Carolina the win as time expired.

== Bracket ==
Quarterfinals; March 11
1	#13 North Carolina	76
8	Clemson	41
4	Wake Forest	84
5	Virginia	85
2	#6 South Carolina	71
7	Maryland	63
3	#19 Duke	61
6	NC State	68

Semifinals; March 12
1	#13 North Carolina	78
5	Virginia	68
2	#6 South Carolina	69
6	NC State	56

Championship Game; March 13
1	#13 North Carolina	51
2	#6 South Carolina	52
