= 1970–71 Ohio Bobcats men's basketball team =

American college basketball season

1970–71 Ohio Bobcats men's basketball
- Conference: Mid-American Conference
- Record: 17–7 (6–4 MAC)
- Head coach: Jim Snyder (22nd season)
- Home arena: Convocation Center

1970–71 Mid-American Conference men's basketball standings
	Conf.				Overall
Team	W		L	PCT	W		L	PCT
Miami (Ohio)	9	–	1	.900	20	–	5	.800
Ohio	6	–	4	.600	17	–	7	.708
Western Michigan	5	–	5	.500	14	–	10	.583
Kent State	4	–	6	.400	13	–	11	.542
Toledo	4	–	6	.400	13	–	11	.542
Bowling Green State	2	–	8	.200	7	–	18	.280
Rankings from AP Poll

The 1970–71 Ohio Bobcats men's basketball team represented Ohio University as a member of the Mid-American Conference in the college basketball season of 1970–71. The team was coached by Jim Snyder and played their home games at Convocation Center. The Bobcats finished with a record of 17–7 and finished second in the MAC regular season with a conference record of 6–4.

== Schedule ==
Date time, TV	Rank^{#}	Opponent^{#}	Result	Record	Site (attendance) city, state
Regular Season
12/1/1970*		West Virginia Wesleyan	W 81–61	1–0	
12/5/1970*		Northwestern	W 77–61	2–0	
12/12/1970*		at Missouri	L 83–91 ^{2OT}	2–1	
12/15/1970*		Wisconsin	W 81–80	3–1	
12/18/1970*	No. 13	at Indiana	L 88–97	3–2	
12/29/1970*		vs. Rollins; Tangerine Bowl	W 81–70	4–2	
12/30/1971*		vs. Seton Hall; Tangerine Bowl	W 84–82	5–2	
1/2/1971*		Illinois State	W 97–73	6–2	
MAC regular season
1/9/1971		Bowling Green	W 100–79	7–2 (1–0)	
1/13/1971		at Kent State	L 68–78	7–3 (1–1)	
1/16/1971		at Toledo	W 62–53	8–3 (2–1)	
1/23/1971		at Miami (OH)	L 70–75	8–4 (2–2)	
1/26/1971*		Cincinnati	W 92–83	9–4	
1/30/1971		Kent State	W 86–76	10-4 (3–2)	
2/3/1971*		Marshall	W 87–80	11-4	
2/6/1971		at Western Michigan	L 79–80	11–5 (3–3)	
2/8/1971*		at Loyola (IL)	W 77–72	12–5	
2/13/1971		Miami (OH)	L 73–74	12–6 (3–4)	
2/16/1971*		at Marshall	W 86–84	13–6	
2/20/1971*		at Ball State	W 84–82	14–6	
2/22/1971*		at Virginia Tech	L 80–86	14–7	
2/27/1971		Toledo	W 93–78	15–7 (4–4)	
3/2/1971		Western Michigan	W 100–77	16–7 (5–4)	
3/6/1971		at Bowling Green	W 105–84	17–7 (6–4)	
*Non-conference game. ^{#}Rankings from AP Poll. (#) Tournament seedings in parentheses. All times are in Eastern Time.

== Statistics ==
=== Team statistics ===
Final 1970–71 statistics

Record	Ohio	OPP
Scoring	2006	1856
Scoring Average	83.58	77.33
Field goals – Att	752–1653	723–1609
Free throws – Att	502–695	410–589
Rebounds	1128	1031
Assists		
Turnovers		
Steals		
Blocked Shots		

=== Player statistics ===
			Minutes		Scoring		Total FGs			Free-Throws			Rebounds						
Player	GP	GS	Tot	Avg	Pts	Avg	FG	FGA	Pct	FT	FTA	Pct	Tot	Avg	A	PF	TO	Stl	Blk
Ken Kowall	24	-			502	20.9	186	409	0.455	130	175	0.743	116	4.8		52			
Craig Love	24	-			442	18.4	182	353	0.516	78	124	0.629	291	12.1		84			
Bob Lalich	23	-			344	15.0	115	263	0.437	114	150	0.760	194	8.4		72			
Bob Howell	24	-			317	13.2	119	238	0.500	79	101	0.782	149	6.2		71			
Tom Corde	22	-			226	10.3	99	228	0.434	38	50	0.760	69	3.1		66			
Gary Wolf	22	-			56	2.5	17	56	0.304	22	26	0.846	76	3.5		36			
Mike Miller	24	-			43	1.8	17	42	0.405	9	16	0.563	22	0.9		23			
Ken Heiby	13	-			28	2.2	7	18	0.389	14	16	0.875	8	0.6		16			
Jeff Knight	10	-			9	0.9	4	17	0.235	1	6	0.167	17	1.7		7			
Ralph Rogers	7	-			6	0.9	1	7	0.143	4	6	0.667	12	1.7		2			
Dan Rumpke		-																	
Total	24	-	-	-	2006	83.6	752	1653	0.455	502	695	0.722	1128	47.0		457			
Opponents	24	-	-	-	1856	77.3	723	1609	0.449	410	589	0.696	1031	43.0		508			

Legend
GP	Games played	GS	Games started	Avg	Average per game
FG	Field-goals made	FGA	Field-goal attempts	Off	Offensive rebounds
Def	Defensive rebounds	A	Assists	TO	Turnovers
Blk	Blocks	Stl	Steals	High	Team high
