= 1971–72 Duke Blue Devils men's basketball team =

American college basketball season

1971–72 Duke Blue Devils men's basketball
- Conference: Atlantic Coast Conference
- Record: 14–12 (6–6 ACC)
- Head coach: Bucky Waters
- Home arena: Duke Indoor Stadium

1971–72 ACC men's basketball standings
	Conf.				Overall
Team	W		L	PCT	W		L	PCT
No. 2 North Carolina †	9	–	3	.750	26	–	5	.839
No. 14 Maryland	8	–	4	.667	27	–	5	.844
No. 20 Virginia	8	–	4	.667	21	–	7	.750
Duke	6	–	6	.500	14	–	12	.538
NC State	6	–	6	.500	16	–	10	.615
Wake Forest	3	–	9	.250	8	–	18	.308
Clemson	2	–	10	.167	10	–	16	.385
† 1972 ACC tournament winner Rankings from AP Poll

The 1971–72 Duke Blue Devils men's basketball team represented Duke University in the 1971–72 NCAA Division I men's basketball season. The head coach was Bucky Waters and the team finished the season with an overall record of 14–12 and did not qualify for the NCAA tournament.

== Roster ==
1971–72 Duke Blue Devils men's basketball team
Players
Coaches

Pos.	#	Name	Height	Weight	Year	Previous school	Hometown
G	21	Jeff Burdette	5 ft 11 in (1.8 m)	165 lb (75 kg)	So	Governor Livingstone	Buena Park, CA
G	15	Pat Doughty	5 ft 10 in (1.78 m)	170 lb (77 kg)	Sr	—	Tempe, AZ
G	11	Zeno Edwards	6 ft 1 in (1.85 m)	195 lb (88 kg)	So	Washington	Washington, NC
G	25	Gary Melchionni	6 ft 3 in (1.91 m)	180 lb (82 kg)	Jr	Bishop Eustace	Woodbury, NJ
F	12	Richie O'Connor	6 ft 4 in (1.93 m)	210 lb (95 kg)	Jr	St. Michael's	Union City, NJ
F	53	Chris Redding	6 ft 9 in (2.06 m)	210 lb (95 kg)	So	Archbishop Carroll	Bethesda, MD
F	32	Ron Righter	6 ft 7 in (2.01 m)	205 lb (93 kg)	So	Doylestown	Chalfont, PA
C	50	Alan Shaw	6 ft 10 in (2.08 m)	220 lb (100 kg)	Jr	Millville	Millville, NJ
G	30	Robby West	6 ft 2 in (1.88 m)	180 lb (82 kg)	Sr	Colombia	South Orange, NJ
C	31	Rob Wood	6 ft 8 in (2.03 m)	225 lb (102 kg)	Jr	Edgemont	Scarsdale, NY
F	35	Stu Yarbrough	6 ft 5 in (1.96 m)	200 lb (91 kg)	Sr	Jordan	Durham, NC

Head coach

Bucky Waters

Assistant coach(es)

Legend

- (C) Team captain
- (S) Suspended
- (I) Ineligible
- (W) Walk-on
- Injured
- Current redshirt

Roster
Last update: 2015-05-10

== Schedule ==
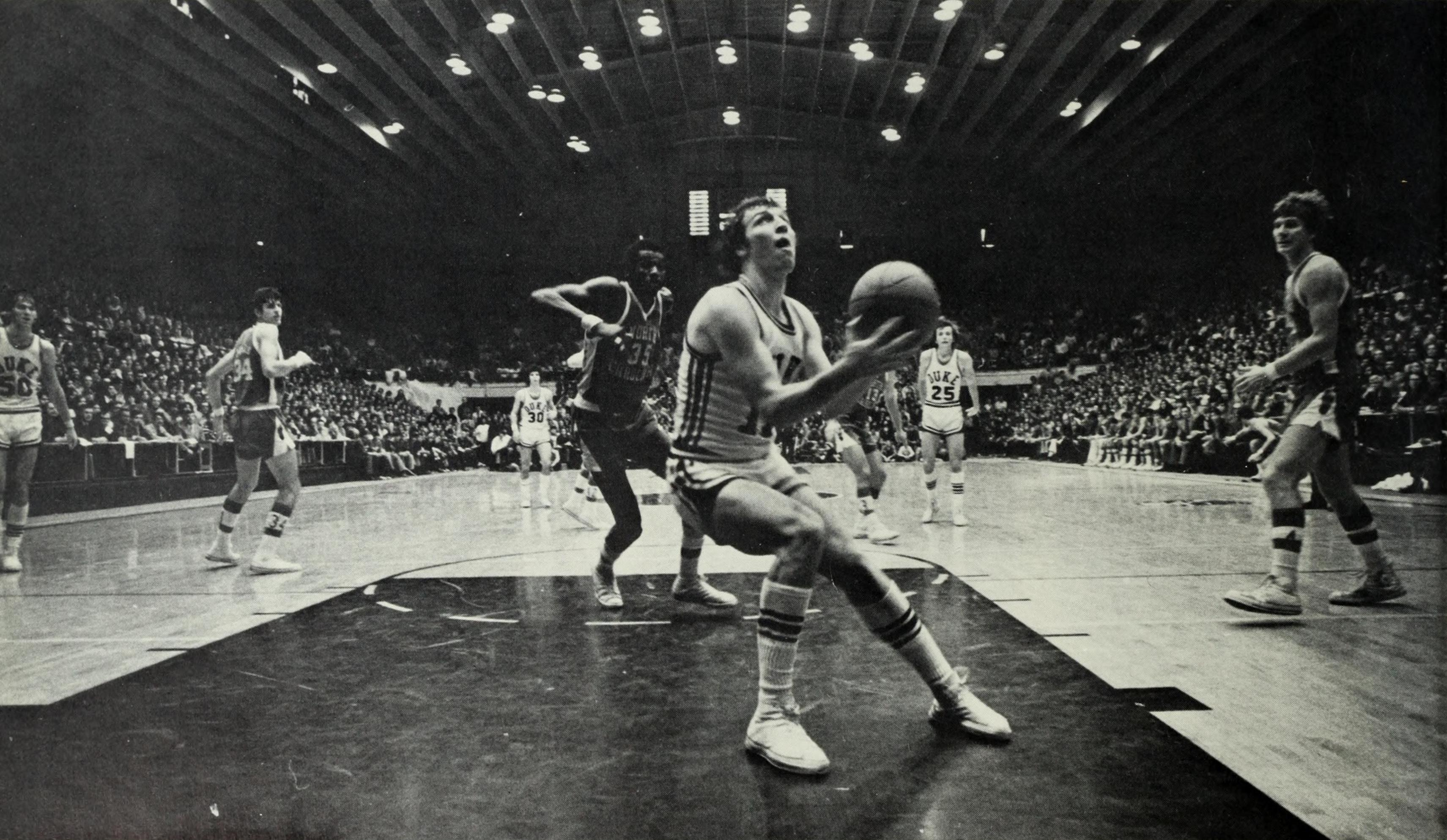
North Carolina at Duke, January 22, 1972

Date time, TV	Rank^{#}	Opponent^{#}	Result	Record	Site city, state
December 1*; 8:00 p.m.		Richmond	W 54–42	1–0	Duke Indoor Stadium (7,325); Durham, NC
December 4; 8:00 p.m.		Virginia	L 77–86	1–1 (0–1)	Duke Indoor Stadium (7,800); Durham, NC
December 7*; 8:00 p.m.		No. 10 Pennsylvania	L 49–50 ^{OT}	1–2	Duke Indoor Stadium (6,950); Durham, NC
December 11*; 8:00 p.m.		East Carolina	W 71–62	2–2	Duke Indoor Stadium (6,850); Durham, NC
December 17*		vs. NC State; Big Four Tournament	L 62–67	2–3	Greensboro Coliseum (11,818); Greensboro, NC
December 18*		vs. Wake Forest; Big Four Tournament	W 70–58	3–3	Greensboro Coliseum (14,312); Greensboro, NC
December 23*; 8:00 p.m.		Dayton	W 68–66	4–3	Duke Indoor Stadium (5,300); Durham, NC
December 27*		vs. St. Peter's; ECAC Holiday Festival	L 74–77	4–4	Madison Square Garden (5,326); New York, NY
December 28*		vs. Syracuse; ECAC Holiday Festival	L 72–74	4–5	Madison Square Garden (1,795); New York, NY
January 5*; 8:00 p.m.		vs. Virginia Tech	W 83–73	5–5	Charlotte Coliseum (1,420); Charlotte, NC
January 12; 8:00 p.m.		at NC State	L 58–85	5–6 (0–2)	Reynolds Coliseum (10,300); Raleigh, NC
January 15; 8:00 p.m.		Clemson	W 71–69	6–6 (1–2)	Duke Indoor Stadium (7,200); Durham, NC
January 19*; 8:00 p.m.		Canisius	W 86–58	7–6	Duke Indoor Stadium (6,475); Durham, NC
January 22; 2:00 p.m.		No. 3 North Carolina; Rivalry	W 76–74	8–6 (2–2)	Duke Indoor Stadium (8,800); Durham, NC
January 26; 8:00 p.m.		Wake Forest	W 77–66	9–6 (3–2)	Duke Indoor Stadium (7,100); Durham, NC
February 5; 8:30 p.m.		at Maryland	L 58–77	9–7 (3–3)	Cole Field House (14,585); College Park, MD
February 9; 8:00 p.m.		at Wake Forest	L 57–62	9–8 (3–4)	Winston-Salem Memorial Coliseum (7,400); Winston-Salem, NC
February 12*; 8:00 p.m.		William & Mary	W 87–69	10–8	Duke Indoor Stadium (5,850); Durham, NC
February 16*; 8:15 p.m.		at Davidson	L 72–74	10–9	Charlotte Coliseum (6,579); Charlotte, NC
February 19; 8:00 p.m.		at No. 6 Virginia	W 86–76	11–9 (4–4)	University Hall (8,250); Charlottesville, Virginia
February 23; 8:00 p.m.		NC State	W 74–73 ^{OT}	12–9 (5–4)	Duke Indoor Stadium (8,200); Durham, NC
February 26; 2:00 p.m.		No. 12 Maryland	W 68–59	13–9 (6–4)	Duke Indoor Stadium (8,600); Durham, NC
March 1; 8:00 p.m.		at Clemson	L 40–59	13–10 (6–5)	Littlejohn Coliseum (7,300); Clemson, SC
March 4; 2:00 p.m.		at No. 3 North Carolina	L 48–63	13–11 (6–6)	Carmichael Auditorium (8,800); Chapel Hill, NC
March 9*		vs. NC State; ACC tournament	W 73–60	14–11	Greensboro Coliseum (15,362); Greensboro, NC
March 10*		vs. No. 3 North Carolina; ACC Tournament	L 48–63	14–12	Greensboro Coliseum (15,362); Greensboro, NC
*Non-conference game. ^{#}Rankings from AP Poll. (#) Tournament seedings in parentheses.
