= 1970–71 Yale Bulldogs men's basketball team =

American college basketball season

1970–71 Yale Bulldogs men's basketball
- Conference: Ivy League
- Record: 4–20 (2–12 Ivy)
- Head coach: Joe Vancisin (14th season)
- Home arena: John J. Lee Amphitheater

1970–71 Ivy League men's basketball standings
	Conf.				Overall
Team	W		L	PCT	W		L	PCT
No. 3 Pennsylvania	14	–	0	1.000	28	–	1	.966
Harvard	11	–	3	.786	16	–	10	.615
Columbia	9	–	5	.643	15	–	9	.625
Princeton	9	–	5	.643	14	–	11	.560
Brown	5	–	9	.357	10	–	15	.400
Dartmouth	5	–	9	.357	10	–	16	.385
Yale	2	–	12	.143	4	–	20	.167
Cornell	1	–	13	.071	5	–	21	.192
Rankings from AP Poll

The 1970–71 Yale Bulldogs men's basketball team represented Yale University during the 1970–71 men's college basketball season. The Bulldogs, led by 14th year head coach Joe Vancisin, played their home games at John J. Lee Amphitheater of the Payne Whitney Gymnasium and were members of the Ivy League. They finished the season 4–20, 2–12 in Ivy League play to finish in seventh place.

== Schedule ==
Date time, TV	Rank^{#}	Opponent^{#}	Result	Record	Site city, state
December 2*		at Fordham	L 56–74	0–1	Rose Hill Gymnasium; The Bronx, New York
December 5*		Connecticut	W 94–80	1–1	Payne Whitney Gymnasium; New Haven, CT
December 9		at Brown	L 72–78	1–2 (0—1)	Marvel Gymnasium; Providence, RI
December 12*		at Holy Cross	L 65–92	1–3 (0—1)	Worcester Memorial Auditorium; Worcester, Massachusetts
December 16		Brown	L 66–79	1–4 (0—2)	Payne Whitney Gymnasium; New Haven, CT
December 18*		vs. Southwestern Louisiana	L 62–64	1–5 (0—2)	
December 19*		vs. Connecticut	L 76–84	1–6 (0—2)	
December 21*		at Rice	L 71–91	1–7 (0—2)	Tudor Fieldhouse; Houston, Texas
December 26*		at Bradley	L 78–112	1–8 (0—2)	Robertson Memorial Field House; Peoria, Illinois
December 28*		at Butler	L 77–96	1–9 (0—2)	Hinkle Fieldhouse; Indianapolis, Indiana
January 2*		at Ohio State	L 75–95	1–10 (0—2)	St. John Arena; Columbus, Ohio
January 8		Columbia	L 58–73	1–11 (0—3)	Payne Whitney Gymnasium; New Haven, CT
January 9		Cornell	W 74–60	2–11 (1—3)	Payne Whitney Gymnasium; New Haven, CT
January 30*		Colgate	W 102–86	3–11 (1—3)	Payne Whitney Gymnasium; New Haven, CT
February 5		at Harvard	L 98–115	3–12 (1—4)	Malkin Athletic Center; Cambridge, Massachusetts
February 6		at Dartmouth	L 65–88	3–13 (1—5)	Alumni Gymnasium; Hanover, NH
February 12		Princeton	L 71–81	3–14 (1—6)	Payne Whitney Gymnasium; New Haven, CT
February 13		Penn	L 77–91	3–15 (1—7)	Payne Whitney Gymnasium; New Haven, CT
February 19		at Cornell	L 72–93	3–16 (1—8)	Barton Hall; Ithaca, NY
February 20		at Columbia	L 71–92	3–17 (1—9)	University Heights Gymnasium; New York City
February 26		at Princeton	L 64–108	3–18 (1—10)	Jadwin Gymnasium; Princeton, NJ
February 27		at Penn	L 63–93	3–19 (1—11)	The Palestra; Philadelphia, Pennsylvania
March 5		Dartmouth	W 94–80	4–19 (2—11)	Payne Whitney Gymnasium; New Haven, CT
March 6		Harvard	L 87–93	4–20 (2—12)	Payne Whitney Gymnasium; New Haven, CT
*Non-conference game. ^{#}Rankings from AP Poll. (#) Tournament seedings in parentheses.
