= Doug Kistler =

American basketball player (1938–1980)

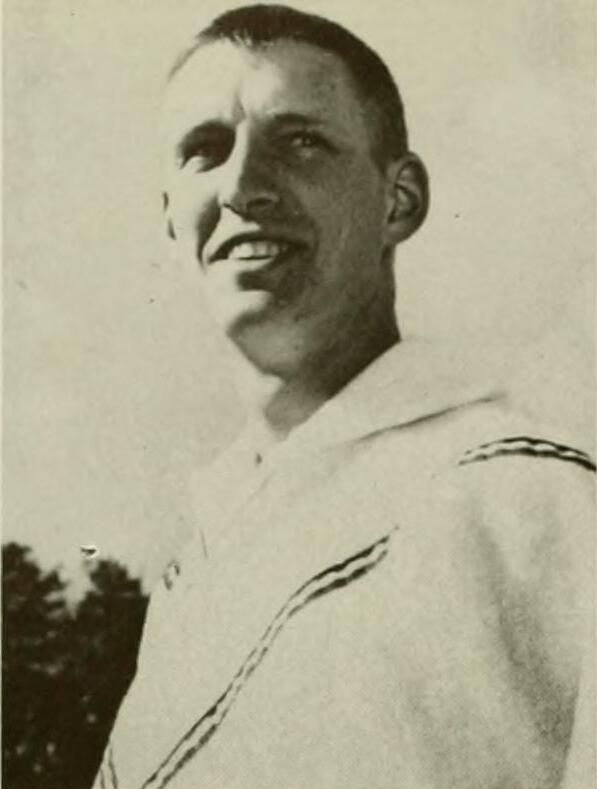
- Kistler with Duke, 1959–60

Personal information
- Born: March 21, 1938
- Died: February 29, 1980 (aged 41) Charlotte, North Carolina
- Listed height: 6 ft 9 in (2.06 m)
- Listed weight: 210 lb (95 kg)

Career information
- High school: Radnor (Wayne, Pennsylvania)
- College: Duke (1958–1961)
- NBA draft: 1961: 3rd round, 26th overall pick
- Drafted by: Detroit Pistons
- Playing career: 1961–1962
- Position: Forward
- Number: 5

Career history
- 1961–1962: New York Knicks

Career highlights
- ACC tournament MVP (1960)
- Stats at NBA.com
- Stats at Basketball Reference

Douglas C. Kistler (March 21, 1938 – February 29, 1980) was an American basketball player. He attended Radnor High School in Wayne, Pennsylvania.

A 6-foot-9-inch (2.06 m), 210 pounds (95 kg) power forward, Kistler played at Duke University from 1959 to 1961, earning the ACC men's basketball tournament Most Valuable Player Award in 1960. Kistler was selected by the Detroit Pistons in the 3rd round (3rd pick, 26th overall) of the 1961 NBA draft. He played five games for the New York Knicks during the 1961–62 NBA season and averaged 1.6 points per game.

Kistler died in an automobile accident in Charlotte, North Carolina in 1980.

== Career statistics ==
Legend
GP	Games played	GS	Games started	MPG	Minutes per game
FG%	Field goal percentage	3P%	3-point field goal percentage	FT%	Free throw percentage
RPG	Rebounds per game	APG	Assists per game	SPG	Steals per game
BPG	Blocks per game	PPG	Points per game	**Bold**	Career high

=== NBA ===
==== Regular season ====
Year	Team	GP	MPG	FG%	FT%	RPG	APG	PPG
1961–62	New York	5	2.6	.500	.500	.2	.0	1.6
