= 1971 National Invitation Tournament =

Annual NCAA basketball competition

- Season: 1970–71
- Teams: 16
- Finals site: Madison Square Garden, New York City
- Champions: North Carolina Tar Heels (1st title)
- Runner-up: Georgia Tech Yellow Jackets (1st title game)
- Semifinalists: St. Bonaventure Bonnies (5th semifinal); Duke Blue Devils (1st semifinal)
- Winning coach: Dean Smith (1st title)
- MVP: Bill Chamberlain (North Carolina)

The 1971 National Invitation Tournament was the 1971 edition of the annual NCAA college basketball competition. 1971 was unique because it was the only time that major rivals Duke and North Carolina had played each other after the ACC tournament until the 2022 NCAA Final Four clash. Eventual ACC member Georgia Tech also made the semis, and lost to North Carolina in the championship. The fourth semifinalist, St. Bonaventure, was playing its first season following the departure of All-American Bob Lanier, who led the Brown Indians to the 1970 Final Four (Lanier was injured in the 1970 regional final vs. Villanova and did not play in either Final Four game).

== Selected teams ==
Below is a list of the 16 teams selected for the tournament.

Team	Conference	Overall record	Appearance	Last bid
Dayton	Independent	18–8	12th	1968
Duke	ACC	18–8	4th	1970
Georgia Tech	Independent	20–8	2nd	1970
Hawaii	Independent	22–4	1st	Never
La Salle	Middle Atlantic	20–6	8th	1965
Louisville	Missouri Valley	20–8	9th	1970
Michigan	Big Ten	18–6	1st	Never
North Carolina	ACC	22–6	2nd	1970
Oklahoma	Big Eight	19–7	2nd	1970
Providence	Independent	19–7	7th	1967
Purdue	Big Ten	18–6	1st	Never
St. Bonaventure	Independent	18–5	8th	1964
St. John's	Independent	18–8	20th	1970
Syracuse	Independent	19–6	5th	1967
Tennessee	SEC	20–6	3rd	1969
UMass	Yankee	23–3	2nd	1970

== Bracket ==
Below is the tournament bracket.

First Round
North Carolina	90
UMass	49
Providence	64
Louisville	58
Tennessee	84
St. John's	83
Duke	68
Dayton	60
Michigan	86
Syracuse	76
Georgia Tech	70
La Salle	67
St. Bonaventure	94
Purdue	79
Hawaii	87
Oklahoma	86

Quarterfinals
North Carolina	86
Providence	79
Tennessee	64
Duke	78
Michigan	70
Georgia Tech	78
St. Bonaventure	73
Hawaii	64

Semifinals
North Carolina	73
Duke	69
Georgia Tech	76
St. Bonaventure	71

Finals
North Carolina	84
Georgia Tech	66

Third place game
Duke	88
St. Bonaventure	92

== See also ==
- 1971 NCAA University Division basketball tournament
- 1971 NCAA College Division basketball tournament
- 1971 NAIA Division I men's basketball tournament
- 1971 National Women's Invitational Tournament
