= 1972 ACC men's basketball tournament =

- Classification: Division I
- Teams: 7
- Site: Greensboro Coliseum; Greensboro, North Carolina
- Champions: North Carolina (5th title)
- Winning coach: Dean Smith (4th title)
- MVP: Bob McAdoo (North Carolina)

1971–72 ACC men's basketball standings
	Conf.				Overall
Team	W		L	PCT	W		L	PCT
No. 2 North Carolina †	9	–	3	.750	26	–	5	.839
No. 14 Maryland	8	–	4	.667	27	–	5	.844
No. 20 Virginia	8	–	4	.667	21	–	7	.750
Duke	6	–	6	.500	14	–	12	.538
NC State	6	–	6	.500	16	–	10	.615
Wake Forest	3	–	9	.250	8	–	18	.308
Clemson	2	–	10	.167	10	–	16	.385
† 1972 ACC tournament winner Rankings from AP Poll

The 1972 Atlantic Coast Conference men's basketball tournament was held in Greensboro, North Carolina, at the Greensboro Coliseum from March 9–11. North Carolina defeated Maryland, 73–64, to win the championship. Bob McAdoo of North Carolina was named the tournament MVP. With the departure of South Carolina, the ACC was left with seven members, so the top seed received a bye into the semifinals from 1972 through and including 1979.

== Bracket ==
Quarterfinals; March 9
4	Duke	73
5	NC State	60
2	#13 Maryland	54
7	Clemson	52
3	#15 Virginia	74
6	Wake Forest	65

Semifinals; March 10
1	#3 North Carolina	63
4	Duke	48
2	#13 Maryland	62
3	#15 Virginia	57

Championship Game; March 11
1	#3 North Carolina	73
2	#13 Maryland	64
