= Middletown, Pennsylvania =

Middletown is the name of more than one location in the U.S. state of Pennsylvania:

- Middletown, Dauphin County, Pennsylvania of the Harrisburg metropolitan area, zip code 17057
  - Middletown (Amtrak station)
- Middletown, Northampton County, Pennsylvania, zip code 18017
- Middletown Township, Bucks County, Pennsylvania, zip code 19047
- Middletown Township, Delaware County, Pennsylvania, zip code 19063
- Middletown Township, Susquehanna County, Pennsylvania
- Middletown, McKean County, Pennsylvania, on Pennsylvania Route 646

== See also ==
- Middleburg (disambiguation)
- Middletown (disambiguation)
- Middletown Township, Pennsylvania (disambiguation)
- West Middletown, Pennsylvania, Washington County
