= 1970–71 Drexel Dragons men's basketball team =

American college basketball season

1970–71 Drexel Dragons men's basketball
- Conference: Middle Atlantic Conferences
- University–Eastern
- Record: 7–17 (0–6 MAC)
- Head coach: Frank Szymanski (3rd season)
- Home arena: 32nd Street Armory

1970–71 MAC men's basketball standings
| | Conf. | | | | Overall |
| Team | W | | L | PCT | W | | L | PCT |
|---|---|---|---|---|---|---|---|---|
University–Eastern
| Saint Joseph's† | 6 | – | 0 | 1.000 | 19 | – | 9 | .679 |
| La Salle | 5 | – | 1 | .833 | 20 | – | 7 | .741 |
| Hofstra | 4 | – | 2 | .667 | 16 | – | 8 | .667 |
| Temple | 3 | – | 3 | .500 | 13 | – | 12 | .520 |
| American | 2 | – | 4 | .333 | 13 | – | 12 | .520 |
| West Chester | 1 | – | 5 | .167 | 7 | – | 18 | .280 |
| Drexel | 0 | – | 6 | .000 | 7 | – | 17 | .292 |
University–Western
| Lafayette | 9 | – | 1 | .900 | 17 | – | 9 | .654 |
| Rider | 8 | – | 2 | .800 | 20 | – | 6 | .769 |
| Delaware | 5 | – | 5 | .500 | 11 | – | 14 | .440 |
| Bucknell | 4 | – | 6 | .400 | 9 | – | 14 | .391 |
| Lehigh | 4 | – | 6 | .400 | 10 | – | 16 | .385 |
| Gettysburg | 0 | – | 10 | .000 | 4 | – | 21 | .160 |
† 1971 MAC men's basketball tournament winner Rankings from AP Poll

The 1970–71 Drexel Dragons men's basketball team represented Drexel University during the 1970–71 men's basketball season. The Dragons, led by 3rd year head coach Frank Szymanski, played their home games at the 32nd Street Armory and were members of the University–Eastern division of the Middle Atlantic Conferences (MAC).

The team finished the season 7–17, and finished in 7th place in the University–Eastern division of the MAC in the regular season.

On March 24, 1971, head coach Frank Szymanski announced that he would be departing Drexel to become the athletic director at the University of Baltimore.

== Roster ==
1970–71 Drexel Dragons men's basketball team
Players
Coaches

| Pos. | # | Name | Height | Weight | Year | Previous school | Hometown |
|---|---|---|---|---|---|---|---|
| C | 44 | Francis Korwek (injured) | 6 ft 6 in (1.98 m) | 200 lb (91 kg) | | Archmere Academy |
| | | | — | — |

Head coach

- Frank Szymanski

Assistant coach(es)

Legend

- (C) Team captain
- (S) Suspended
- (I) Ineligible
- (W) Walk-on
- Injured
- Current redshirt

== Schedule ==
| Date time, TV | Rank^{#} | Opponent^{#} | Result | Record | High points | High rebounds | High assists | Site (attendance) city, state |
Regular season
| December 2, 1970*; 8:00 pm | | at Delaware Valley | L 66–70 | 0–1 | – | – | – | |
| Unknown* | | Pennsylvania Military College | W 62–55 | 1–1 | – | – | – | 32nd Street Armory; Philadelphia, PA |
| December 14, 1970 | | at American | L 64–91 | 1–2 (0–1) | – | – | – | |
| Unknown | | at Hofstra | L 61–74 | 1–3 (0–2) | – | – | – | |
| Unknown* | | at Lehigh | L 74–76 | 1–4 | – | – | – | |
| Unknown* | | vs. Towson State; Berwick Tournament Semifinals | W 74–59 | 2–4 | – | – | – | Bloomsburg, PA |
| December 1970* | | at Bloomsburg; Berwick Tournament Championship | L 60–63 | 2–5 | – | – | – | Bloomsburg, PA |
| January 3, 1971* | | Delaware | L 69–77 | 2–6 | – | – | – | 32nd Street Armory; Philadelphia, PA |
| Unknown | | at Muhlenberg | L 71–80 | 2–7 | – | – | – | |
| January 9, 1971 | | at West Chester | L 55–61 | 2–8 (0–3) | – | – | – | |
| January 12, 1971* | | Swarthmore | W 105–64 | 3–8 | 27 – Coley | 18 – Coley | – | 32nd Street Armory; Philadelphia, PA |
| January 16, 1971*; 8:30 pm | | at Moravian | L 64–78 | 3–9 | – | – | – | |
| January 19, 1971; 8:00 pm | | Saint Joseph's | L 75–84 | 3–10 (0–4) | 29 – Glick | 9 – Gunter | 4 – Glick | 32nd Street Armory (2,200); Philadelphia, PA |
| January 23, 1971*; 8:00 pm | | Gettysburg | W 70–68 | 4–10 | – | – | – | 32nd Street Armory; Philadelphia, PA |
| January 28, 1971; 8:00 pm | | No. 14 La Salle | L 63–81 | 4–11 (0–5) | – | – | – | 32nd Street Armory; Philadelphia, PA |
| January 30, 1971*; 8:00 pm | | at Rider | L 80–88 | 4–12 | – | – | – | |
| February 1, 1971; 8:00 pm | | at Temple | L 53–54 | 4–13 (0–6) | – | – | – | (1,200) |
| February 3, 1971*; 8:00 pm | | Haverford | W 88–72 | 5–13 | – | – | – | 32nd Street Armory; Philadelphia, PA |
| February 6, 1971*; 8:30 pm | | at Johns Hopkins | L 74–77 | 5–14 | – | – | – | |
| February 10, 1971*; 8:00 pm | | at Delaware | L 48–72 | 5–15 | – | – | – | |
| February 13, 1971*; 8:00 pm | | Scranton | W 93–74 | 6–15 | – | – | – | 32nd Street Armory; Philadelphia, PA |
| February 17, 1971*; 8:00 pm | | Ursinus | L 60–62 | 6–16 | – | – | – | 32nd Street Armory; Philadelphia, PA |
| February 20, 1971*; 8:00 pm | | Franklin & Marshall | W 94–60 | 7–16 | – | – | – | 32nd Street Armory; Philadelphia, PA |
| February 24, 1971*; 8:15 pm | | at Philadelphia Textile | L 66–83 | 7–17 | – | – | – | Philadelphia, PA |
*Non-conference game. ^{#}Rankings from AP. (#) Tournament seedings in parentheses. All times are in Eastern Time.
