= 1972–73 North Carolina Tar Heels men's basketball team =

American college basketball season

1972–73 North Carolina Tar Heels men's basketball

NIT, 3rd place
- Conference: Atlantic Coast Conference

Ranking
- Coaches: No. 12
- AP: No. 11
- Record: 25–8 (8–4 ACC)
- Head coach: Dean Smith (12th season)
- Assistant coaches: John Lotz (8th season); Bill Guthridge (6th season); Eddie Fogler (2nd season)
- Captains: Donn Johnston; George Karl
- Home arena: Carmichael Auditorium

1972–73 ACC men's basketball standings
	Conf.				Overall
Team	W		L	PCT	W		L	PCT
No. 2 NC State †	12	–	0	1.000	27	–	0	1.000
No. 11 North Carolina	8	–	4	.667	25	–	8	.758
No. 8 Maryland	7	–	5	.583	23	–	7	.767
Duke	4	–	8	.333	12	–	14	.462
Virginia	4	–	8	.333	13	–	12	.520
Clemson	4	–	8	.333	12	–	14	.462
Wake Forest	3	–	9	.250	12	–	15	.444
† 1973 ACC tournament winner Rankings from AP Poll

The 1972–73 North Carolina Tar Heels men's basketball team represented the University of North Carolina at Chapel Hill during the 1972–73 men's college basketball season.

== Schedule ==
Date time, TV	Rank^{#}	Opponent^{#}	Result	Record	Site city, state
November 25*		St. Thomas (FL)	W 107–62		Carmichael Auditorium; Chapel Hill, NC
December 2*		Pittsburgh	W 99–70		Carmichael Auditorium; Chapel Hill, NC
December 5*		vs. Dartmouth	W 128–86		Greensboro, NC
December 9*	No. 13	vs. Virginia Tech	W 96–82		Charlotte, NC
December 11*	No. 13	vs. No. 8 Kentucky	W 78–70		Louisville, KY
December 15*	No. 11	vs. Duke; Big Four Tournament	W 91–86		Greensboro, NC
December 16*	No. 11	vs. No. 6 NC State; Big Four Tournament	L 61–68		Greensboro, NC
December 22*	No. 13	at California	W 64–61		Berkeley, CA
December 28*	No. 11	vs. Utah; Rainbow Classic	W 73–61		Honolulu, HI
December 29*	No. 11	vs. Washington; Rainbow Classic	W 89–72		Honolulu, HI
December 30*	No. 11	vs. Louisville; Rainbow Classic	W 89–86		Honolulu, HI
January 4*	No. 9	vs. Furman	W 100–67		Charlotte, NC
January 6*	No. 9	vs. Nebraska	W 79–62		Greensboro, NC
January 10	No. 7	Clemson	W 92–58		Carmichael Auditorium; Chapel Hill, NC
January 17	No. 4	at Wake Forest	W 99–80		Greensboro, NC
January 20	No. 4	Duke	W 82–71		Carmichael Auditorium; Chapel Hill, NC
January 25	No. 3	Virginia	L 78–84		Carmichael Auditorium; Chapel Hill, NC
January 27	No. 3	at No. 4 Maryland	L 88–94		Cole Field House; College Park, MD
January 31	No. 8	Wake Forest	W 69–51		Carmichael Auditorium; Chapel Hill, NC
February 5	No. 8	at No. 2 NC State	L 73–76		Raleigh, NC
February 9*	No. 6	vs. Georgia Tech; North-South Doubleheader	W 107–72		Charlotte, NC
February 10	No. 6	vs. Clemson; North-South Doubleheader	W 84–69		Charlotte, NC
February 14	No. 6	No. 10 Maryland	W 95–85		Carmichael Auditorium; Chapel Hill, NC
February 17*	No. 6	vs. Florida State	W 91–79		Madison Square Garden; New York, NY
February 21*	No. 6	Miami (OH)	L 92–102		Carmichael Auditorium; Chapel Hill, NC
February 24	No. 6	at Virginia	W 76–68		Charlottesville, VA
February 27	No. 6	No. 2 NC State	L 78–82		Carmichael Auditorium; Chapel Hill, NC
March 3	No. 7	at Duke	W 72–70		Cameron Indoor Stadium; Durham, NC
ACC Tournament
March 8*	(2) No. 8	vs. (7) Wake Forest; Quarterfinal	L 52–54 ^{OT}		Greensboro Coliseum; Greensboro, NC
National Invitation Tournament
March 17*	No. 11	vs. Oral Roberts; First round	W 82–65		Madison Square Garden; New York, NY
March 20*	No. 11	vs. Massachusetts; Quarterfinal	W 73–63		Madison Square Garden; New York, NY
March 24*	No. 11	vs. Notre Dame; Semifinal	L 71–78		Madison Square Garden; New York, NY
March 25*	No. 11	vs. Alabama; Third Place	W 88–69		Madison Square Garden; New York, NY
*Non-conference game. ^{#}Rankings from AP poll. (#) Tournament seedings in parentheses.
