= 1973 ACC men's basketball tournament =

- Classification: Division I
- Teams: 7
- Site: Greensboro Coliseum; Greensboro, North Carolina
- Champions: NC State (7th title)
- Winning coach: Norm Sloan (2nd title)
- MVP: Tommy Burleson (NC State)

1972–73 ACC men's basketball standings
	Conf.				Overall
Team	W		L	PCT	W		L	PCT
No. 2 NC State †	12	–	0	1.000	27	–	0	1.000
No. 11 North Carolina	8	–	4	.667	25	–	8	.758
No. 8 Maryland	7	–	5	.583	23	–	7	.767
Duke	4	–	8	.333	12	–	14	.462
Virginia	4	–	8	.333	13	–	12	.520
Clemson	4	–	8	.333	12	–	14	.462
Wake Forest	3	–	9	.250	12	–	15	.444
† 1973 ACC tournament winner Rankings from AP Poll

The 1973 Atlantic Coast Conference men's basketball tournament was held in Greensboro, North Carolina, at the Greensboro Coliseum from March 8–10. NC State defeated Maryland, 76–74, to win the championship. Tommy Burleson of NC State was named the tournament MVP.

== Bracket ==
Quarterfinals; March 8
4	Duke	55
5	Virginia	59
2	#8 North Carolina	52
7	Wake Forest	54^{OT}
3	#10 Maryland	77
6	Clemson	61

Semifinals; March 9
1	#2 NC State	63
5	Virginia	51
7	Wake Forest	65
3	#10 Maryland	73

Championship Game; March 10
1	#2 NC State	76
3	#10 Maryland	74
