= 1972–73 Duke Blue Devils men's basketball team =

American college basketball season

1972–73 Duke Blue Devils men's basketball
- Conference: Atlantic Coast Conference
- Record: 12–14 (4–8 ACC)
- Head coach: Bucky Waters
- Home arena: Cameron Indoor Stadium

1972–73 ACC men's basketball standings
	Conf.				Overall
Team	W		L	PCT	W		L	PCT
No. 2 NC State †	12	–	0	1.000	27	–	0	1.000
No. 11 North Carolina	8	–	4	.667	25	–	8	.758
No. 8 Maryland	7	–	5	.583	23	–	7	.767
Duke	4	–	8	.333	12	–	14	.462
Virginia	4	–	8	.333	13	–	12	.520
Clemson	4	–	8	.333	12	–	14	.462
Wake Forest	3	–	9	.250	12	–	15	.444
† 1973 ACC tournament winner Rankings from AP Poll

The 1972–73 Duke Blue Devils men's basketball team represented Duke University in the 1972–73 NCAA Division I men's basketball season. The head coach was Bucky Waters and the team finished the season with an overall record of 12–14 and did not qualify for the NCAA tournament.

== Schedule ==
Date time, TV	Rank^{#}	Opponent^{#}	Result	Record	Site city, state
December 2, 1972*		William & Mary	W 98–74	1–0	Cameron Indoor Stadium; Durham, N.C.
December 8, 1972*		vs. Santa Clara; Cable Car Classic	W 69–65	2–0	War Memorial Gymnasium; San Francisco, Calif.
December 9, 1972*		vs. San Francisco; Cable Car Classic	L 68–72	2–1	War Memorial Gymnasium; San Francisco, Calif.
December 12, 1972*		East Carolina	W 108–74	3–1	Cameron Indoor Stadium; Durham, N.C.
December 15, 1972		vs. No. 11 North Carolina; Big Four Tournament	L 86–91	3–2	Greensboro Coliseum; Greensboro, N.C.
December 16, 1972		vs. Wake Forest; Big Four Tournament	W 80–67	4–2	Greensboro Coliseum; Greensboro, N.C.
December 27, 1972*		at UNLV; Las Vegas Classic	L 83–89	4–3	Las Vegas Convention Center; Las Vegas, Nev.
December 28, 1972*		vs. Purdue; Las Vegas Classic	L 77–82	4–4	Las Vegas Convention Center; Las Vegas, Nev.
December 30, 1972*		Harvard	W 102–76	5–4	Cameron Indoor Stadium; Durham, N.C.
January 3, 1973		at Virginia	L 74–80 ^{1OT}	5–5	
January 6, 1973		at Wake Forest	L 80–83	5–6	
January 10, 1973		at NC State	L 87–94	5–7	
January 13, 1973		Clemson	W 75–73	6–7	Cameron Indoor Stadium; Durham, N.C.
January 17, 1973*		at Davidson	W 78–75	7–7	
January 20, 1973		at No. 4 North Carolina	L 71–82	7–8	
January 24, 1973*		at Richmond	W 70–66	8–8	
January 27, 1973		at Georgia Tech	L 86–88	8–9	
February 3, 1973		No. 3 Maryland	W 85–81	9–9	Cameron Indoor Stadium; Durham, N.C.
February 7, 1973		Wake Forest	W 84–71	10–9	Cameron Indoor Stadium; Durham, N.C.
February 13, 1973		Virginia	W 90–66	11–9	Cameron Indoor Stadium; Durham, N.C.
February 17, 1973		Notre Dame	W 86–74	12–9	Cameron Indoor Stadium; Durham, N.C.
February 21, 1973		NC State	L 50–74	12–10	Cameron Indoor Stadium; Durham, N.C.
February 24, 1973		at No. 8 Maryland	L 68–96	12–11	
February 28, 1973		at Clemson	L 50–75	12–12	
March 3, 1973		No. 7 North Carolina	L 70–72	12–13	Cameron Indoor Stadium; Durham, N.C.
March 8, 1973		vs. Virginia; ACC tournament	L 55–59	12–14	Greensboro Coliseum; Greensboro, N.C.
*Non-conference game. ^{#}Rankings from AP Poll. (#) Tournament seedings in parentheses. Source: Duke media guide
