= Middletown Township, Pennsylvania =

Middletown Township is the name of some places in the U.S. state of Pennsylvania:

- Middletown Township, Bucks County, Pennsylvania
- Middletown Township, Delaware County, Pennsylvania
- Middletown Township, Susquehanna County, Pennsylvania
