= 1970–71 Duke Blue Devils men's basketball team =

American college basketball season

1970–71 Duke Blue Devils men's basketball

NIT, Third-place game
- Conference: Atlantic Coast Conference
- Record: 20–10 (9–5 ACC)
- Head coach: Bucky Waters
- Home arena: Duke Indoor Stadium

1970–71 ACC men's basketball standings
	Conf.				Overall
Team	W		L	PCT	W		L	PCT
No. 13 North Carolina	11	–	3	.786	26	–	6	.813
No. 6 South Carolina †	10	–	4	.714	23	–	6	.793
Duke	9	–	5	.643	20	–	10	.667
Wake Forest	7	–	7	.500	16	–	10	.615
Virginia	6	–	8	.429	15	–	11	.577
NC State	5	–	9	.357	13	–	14	.481
Maryland	5	–	9	.357	14	–	12	.538
Clemson	3	–	11	.214	9	–	17	.346
† 1971 ACC tournament winner Rankings from AP Poll

The 1970–71 Duke Blue Devils men's basketball team represented Duke University in the 1970–71 NCAA Division I men's basketball season. The head coach was Bucky Waters and the team finished the season with an overall record of 20–10 and did not qualify for the NCAA tournament.
