= 1971–72 North Carolina Tar Heels men's basketball team =

American college basketball season

1971–72 North Carolina Tar Heels men's basketball

ACC Tournament Champions ACC Regular Season Champions

NCAA Men's Division I Tournament, Final Four
- Conference: Atlantic Coast Conference

Ranking
- Coaches: No. 2
- AP: No. 2
- Record: 26–5 (9–3 ACC)
- Head coach: Dean Smith (11th season)
- Assistant coaches: John Lotz (7th season); Bill Guthridge (5th season); Eddie Fogler (1st season)
- Captains: Steve Previs; Dennis Wuycik
- Home arena: Carmichael Auditorium

1971–72 ACC men's basketball standings
	Conf.				Overall
Team	W		L	PCT	W		L	PCT
No. 2 North Carolina †	9	–	3	.750	26	–	5	.839
No. 14 Maryland	8	–	4	.667	27	–	5	.844
No. 20 Virginia	8	–	4	.667	21	–	7	.750
Duke	6	–	6	.500	14	–	12	.538
NC State	6	–	6	.500	16	–	10	.615
Wake Forest	3	–	9	.250	8	–	18	.308
Clemson	2	–	10	.167	10	–	16	.385
† 1972 ACC tournament winner Rankings from AP Poll

The 1971–72 North Carolina Tar Heels men's basketball team represented University of North Carolina. The head coach was Dean Smith. The team played its home games in Chapel Hill, North Carolina, and was a member of the Atlantic Coast Conference.

== Roster ==
Name	#	Position	Height	Year	Home Town
Ray Hite	12	Guard	5–10	Sophomore	Hyattsville, MD
Steve Previs	13	Guard	6–3	Senior	Bethel Park, MD
Bill Chambers	20	Guard/Forward	6–4	Senior	Greensboro, NC
George Karl	22	Guard	6–2	Junior	Penn Hills, PA
John O'Donnell	30	Forward	6–6	Sophomore	New York, NY
Bill Chamberlain	31	Forward	6–6	Senior	New York, NY
Darrell Elston	32	Guard	6–3	Sophomore	Tipton, IN
Roger Jamison	33	Guard	5–11	Junior	Greensboro, NC
Bobby Jones	34	Forward	6–8	Sophomore	Charlotte, NC
Bob McAdoo	35	Center/Forward	6–9	Junior	Greensboro, NC
Donn Johnston	40	Forward	6–8	Junior	Jamestown, NY
Kim Huband	42	Guard/Forward	6–5	Senior	Wilmington, NC
Craig Corson	43	Center	6–10	Senior	Contoocook, NH
Dennis Wuycik	44	Forward	6–6	Senior	Ambridge, PA

== Schedule ==
Date time, TV	Rank^{#}	Opponent^{#}	Result	Record	Site city, state
December 2*	No. 2	Rice	W 127–69		Carmichael Auditorium; Chapel Hill, NC
December 4*	No. 2	at Pittsburgh	W 90–75		Fitzgerald Field House; Pittsburgh, PA
December 6*	No. 2	at Princeton	L 73–89		Jadwin Gymnasium; Princeton, NJ
December 11*	No. 3	Virginia Tech	W 93–60		Carmichael Auditorium; Chapel Hill, NC
December 17*	No. 4	vs. Wake Forest; Big Four Tournament	W 99–76		
December 18*	No. 4	vs. NC State; Big Four Tournament	W 99–68		
December 27*	No. 4	vs. Harvard	W 96–78		
December 29*	No. 4	vs. St. Joseph's (PA); Sugar Bowl Tournament	W 93–77		Loyola Field House; New Orleans, LA
December 30*	No. 4	vs. Bradley; Sugar Bowl Tournament	W 75–69		New Orleans, LA
January 8*	No. 3	Furman	W 118–66		Carmichael Auditorium; Chapel Hill, NC
January 12	No. 3	at Clemson	W 81–61		Clemson, SC
January 15	No. 3	at No. 8 Virginia	W 85–79		Charlottesville, VA
January 19	No. 3	Wake Forest	W 92–77		Carmichael Auditorium; Chapel Hill, NC
January 22	No. 3	at Duke	L 74–76		Cameron Indoor Stadium; Durham, NC
January 29	No. 3	No. 18 Maryland	W 92–72		Carmichael Auditorium; Chapel Hill, NC
February 3	No. 3	at Wake Forest	W 71–59		Greensboro, NC
February 7	No. 4	NC State	W 101–78		Carmichael Auditorium; Chapel Hill, NC
February 11	No. 3	vs. Clemson; North-South Doubleheader	W 73–50		Charlotte, NC
February 12*	No. 3	vs. Georgia Tech; North-South Doubleheader	W 118–73		Charlotte, NC
February 16	No. 3	at No. 19 Maryland	L 77–79 ^{OT}		College Park, MD
February 19*	No. 3	vs. Notre Dame	W 99–74		Madison Square Garden; New York, NY
February 23*	No. 5	Georgia Tech	W 87–66		Carmichael Auditorium; Chapel Hill, NC
February 26	No. 5	No. 13 Virginia	W 91–78		Carmichael Auditorium; Chapel Hill, NC
February 29	No. 5	at NC State	L 84–85		Raleigh, NC
March 4	No. 3	Duke	W 93–69		Carmichael Auditorium; Chapel Hill, NC
March 10*	No. 3	vs. Duke; ACC tournament	W 63–48		Greensboro, NC
March 11*	No. 3	vs. No. 13 Maryland; ACC Tournament	W 73–64		Greensboro, NC
March 16*	No. 2	vs. No. 6 South Carolina; NCAA tournament	W 92–69		WVU Coliseum; Morgantown, WV
March 18*	No. 2	vs. No. 3 Pennsylvania; NCAA Tournament	W 73–59		WVU Coliseum; Morgantown, WV
March 23*	No. 2	vs. No. 10 Florida State; NCAA Tournament	L 75–79		Los Angeles Sports Arena; Los Angeles
March 25*	No. 2	vs. No. 4 Louisville; NCAA Tournament • Third-place game	W 105–91		Los Angeles Sports Arena; Los Angeles
*Non-conference game. ^{#}Rankings from AP Poll. (#) Tournament seedings in parentheses. E=East.

== Team players drafted into the NBA ==
Year	Round	Pick	Player	NBA club
1972	1	2	Bob McAdoo	Buffalo Braves
1972	2	27	Dennis Wuycik	Boston Celtics
1972	3	43	Bill Chamberlain	Golden State Warriors
1972	7	111	Steve Previs	Boston Celtics
1972	13	176	Kim Huband	Buffalo Braves
1973	5	66	George Karl	New York Knicks
1973	18	207	Donn Johnston	Buffalo Braves
1974	1	5	Bobby Jones	Houston Rockets
1974	3	43	Darrell Elston	Atlanta Hawks
1974	10	174	John O'Donnell	New York Knicks
