= 1970–71 Cincinnati Bearcats men's basketball team =

American college basketball season

1970–71 Cincinnati Bearcats men's basketball
- Conference: Independent
- Record: 14–12
- Head coach: Tay Baker
- Home arena: Armory Fieldhouse

1970–71 NCAA University Division men's basketball independents standings
	Conf.				Overall
Team	W		L	PCT	W		L	PCT
No. 2 Marquette		–		–	28	–	1	.966
No. 9 Fordham		–		–	26	–	3	.897
No. 11 Jacksonville		–		–	22	–	4	.846
No. 15 Duquesne		–		–	21	–	4	.840
Hawaii		–		–	23	–	5	.821
No. 19 Villanova		–		–	27	–	7	.794
St. Bonaventure		–		–	21	–	6	.778
No. 14 Houston		–		–	22	–	7	.759
Utah State		–		–	20	–	7	.741
Syracuse		–		–	19	–	7	.731
Georgia Tech		–		–	23	–	9	.719
Providence		–		–	20	–	8	.714
Fairleigh Dickinson		–		–	16	–	7	.696
Rutgers		–		–	16	–	7	.696
Holy Cross		–		–	18	–	8	.692
No. 12 Notre Dame		–		–	20	–	9	.690
Dayton		–		–	18	–	9	.667
St. John's (NY)		–		–	18	–	9	.667
Denver		–		–	17	–	9	.654
Florida State		–		–	17	–	9	.654
Loyola (LA)		–		–	16	–	10	.615
Marshall		–		–	16	–	10	.615
Colgate		–		–	15	–	10	.600
Saint Francis (PA)		–		–	15	–	10	.600
Pittsburgh		–		–	14	–	10	.583
Boston College		–		–	15	–	11	.577
Northern Illinois		–		–	13	–	10	.565
Southern Illinois		–		–	13	–	10	.565
Creighton		–		–	14	–	11	.560
Virginia Tech		–		–	14	–	11	.560
Manhattan		–		–	13	–	11	.542
Cincinnati		–		–	14	–	12	.538
Detroit		–		–	14	–	12	.538
Niagara		–		–	14	–	12	.538
West Virginia		–		–	13	–	12	.520
Centenary		–		–	13	–	13	.500
Pan American		–		–	13	–	13	.500
Navy		–		–	12	–	12	.500
Air Force		–		–	12	–	14	.462
Georgetown		–		–	12	–	14	.462
Seattle		–		–	12	–	14	.462
Army		–		–	11	–	13	.458
Saint Peter's		–		–	11	–	13	.458
Iona		–		–	10	–	12	.455
Penn State		–		–	10	–	12	.455
George Washington		–		–	11	–	14	.440
Seton Hall		–		–	11	–	15	.423
Long Island		–		–	10	–	15	.400
Butler		–		–	10	–	16	.385
Canisius		–		–	8	–	13	.381
Fairfield		–		–	9	–	15	.375
Hardin–Simmons		–		–	9	–	16	.360
Oklahoma City		–		–	9	–	16	.360
Xavier		–		–	9	–	17	.346
DePaul		–		–	8	–	17	.320
St. Francis (NY)		–		–	8	–	17	.320
Tulane		–		–	8	–	18	.308
Boston University		–		–	7	–	18	.280
Miami (FL)		–		–	7	–	19	.269
NYU		–		–	5	–	20	.200
Portland		–		–	5	–	21	.192
Loyola (IL)		–		–	4	–	20	.167
Rankings from AP Poll

The 1970–71 Cincinnati Bearcats men's basketball team represented the University of Cincinnati during the 1970–71 NCAA men's basketball season.

== Roster ==
1970–71 Cincinnati Bearcats men's basketball team
Players
Coaches

Pos.	#	Name	Height	Weight	Year	Hometown
F	22	Jack Ajzner	6 ft 9 in (2.06 m)	220 lb (100 kg)	Sr	Paterson, New Jersey
G	31	Rick Barrett	6 ft 2 in (1.88 m)	170 lb (77 kg)	Jr	Trenton, New Jersey
C	43	Denny Bosse	6 ft 7 in (2.01 m)	210 lb (95 kg)	Jr	Cincinnati, Ohio
F	40	Derrek Dickey	6 ft 7 in (2.01 m)	210 lb (95 kg)	So	Cincinnati, Ohio
F	24	Don Hass	6 ft 4 in (1.93 m)	210 lb (95 kg)	Sr	Trenton, New Jersey
G	23	Jerry Schmeider	6 ft 0 in (1.83 m)	175 lb (79 kg)	Jr	Butler, Pennsylvania
F	55	Tom Schoenfield	6 ft 4 in (1.93 m)	195 lb (88 kg)	So	Cincinnati, Ohio
G	50	Steve Wenderfer	6 ft 4 in (1.93 m)	170 lb (77 kg)	Sr	Paterson, New Jersey

Head coach

- Tay Baker

Assistant coach(es)

Legend

- (C) Team captain
- (S) Suspended
- (I) Ineligible
- (W) Walk-on
- Injured
- Current redshirt

== Schedule ==
Date time, TV	Rank^{#}	Opponent^{#}	Result	Record	Site city, state
December 1		Cleveland State	W 85–75	1–0	Armory Fieldhouse; Cincinnati, Ohio
December 5		at UC-Riverside	W 98–75	2–0	Armory Fieldhouse; Cincinnati, Ohio
December 12		at Miami (OH)	L 56–69	2–1	Millett Hall; Oxford, Ohio
December 17		at Iowa	W 73–70	3–1	Iowa Field House; Iowa City, Iowa
December 19		Bowling Green State	W 86–74	4–1	Armory Fieldhouse; Cincinnati, Ohio
December 22		Loyola Marymount	L 61–63	4–2	Armory Fieldhouse; Cincinnati, Ohio
December 26		California	L 76–82	4–3	Armory Fieldhouse; Cincinnati, Ohio
December 29		at Vanderbilt	L 83–86	4–4	
December 30		at Loyola (IL)	W 74–64	5–4	
January 2		Drake	W 60–59	6–4	Armory Fieldhouse; Cincinnati, Ohio
January 4		Rice	W 92–80	7–4	Armory Fieldhouse; Cincinnati, Ohio
January 8		at St. Louis	L 67–68	7–5	St. Louis Arena
January 11		Northern Illinois	W 87–86	8–5	Armory Fieldhouse; Cincinnati, Ohio
January 20		at Louisville	L 72–85	8–6	Freedom Hall; Louisville, Kentucky
January 22		vs. Iowa	W 73–69	9–6	
January 26		at Ohio	L 83–92	9–7	Convocation Center
January 30		West Texas A&M	L 83–94	9–8	Armory Fieldhouse; Cincinnati, Ohio
February 2		Richmond	W 78–71	10–8	Armory Fieldhouse; Cincinnati, Ohio
February 6		at Kent State	W 74–63	11–8	Memorial Athletic & Convocation Center; Kent, Ohio
February 11		Dayton	L 69–70	11–9	Armory Fieldhouse; Cincinnati, Ohio
February 13		Old Dominion	W 108–96	12–9	Armory Fieldhouse; Cincinnati, Ohio
February 17		Xavier	L 65–66	12–10	Armory Fieldhouse; Cincinnati, Ohio
February 20		at George Washington	L 89–95	12–11	Fort Myer Ceremonial Hall
February 24		Louisville	W 79–78	13–11	Armory Fieldhouse; Cincinnati, Ohio
February 27		at Davidson	L 67–70	13–12	Charlotte Coliseum
March 2		Buffalo	W 82–59	14–12	Armory Fieldhouse; Cincinnati, Ohio
*Non-conference game. ^{#}Rankings from AP Poll. (#) Tournament seedings in parentheses.
