= 1970–71 South Carolina Gamecocks men's basketball team =

American college basketball season

1970–71 South Carolina Gamecocks men's basketball

ACC Tournament champion

NCAA Tournament, Sweet Sixteen
- Conference: Atlantic Coast Conference

Ranking
- Coaches: No. 6
- AP: No. 6
- Record: 23–6 (10–4 ACC)
- Head coach: Frank McGuire (7th season)
- Home arena: Carolina Coliseum

1970–71 ACC men's basketball standings
	Conf.				Overall
Team	W		L	PCT	W		L	PCT
No. 13 North Carolina	11	–	3	.786	26	–	6	.813
No. 6 South Carolina †	10	–	4	.714	23	–	6	.793
Duke	9	–	5	.643	20	–	10	.667
Wake Forest	7	–	7	.500	16	–	10	.615
Virginia	6	–	8	.429	15	–	11	.577
NC State	5	–	9	.357	13	–	14	.481
Maryland	5	–	9	.357	14	–	12	.538
Clemson	3	–	11	.214	9	–	17	.346
† 1971 ACC tournament winner Rankings from AP Poll

The 1970–71 South Carolina Gamecocks men's basketball team represented the University of South Carolina during the 1970–71 men's college basketball season. South Carolina won the ACC tournament championship, defeating North Carolina in the championship game 52–51. This was the last season South Carolina ever played in the ACC. The success South Carolina achieved on the court brought resentment and anger from fellow ACC schools, especially those on "Tobacco Road," as the conference members of the state of North Carolina were known. The hostility of the road crowds, the unfriendly behavior of coaches and athletic directors in the conference, and the discrepancies in eligibility standards led head coach Frank McGuire to support South Carolina becoming an Independent before the 1971–72 season. Despite South Carolina leaving the ACC in 1971, (as of 2018) they still remain the only school in the state of South Carolina to win an ACC tournament championship, even though Clemson, still remains in the ACC.

== Roster ==
Name	Position	Height	Year	Stats
John Roche	Guard	6–3	Senior	21.6 Pts, 2.3 Reb
Tom Owens	Center	6–10	Senior	15.0 Pts, 12.9 Reb
Tom Riker	Forward	6–10	Junior	14.0 Pts, 8.0 Reb
Kevin Joyce	Guard	6–2	Sophomore	12.1 Pts, 4.8 Reb
Rick Aydlett	Forward	6–7	Junior	7.8 Pts, 3.5 Reb
Bob Carver	Guard	6–2	Junior	7.2 Pts, 2.0 Reb
John Ribock	Forward	6–8	Senior	1.8 Pts, 2.3 Reb
Danny Traylor	Center	7–0	Sophomore	1.8 Pts, 2.1 Reb
Casey Manning	Guard	6–3	Sophomore	0.7 Pts, 0.7 Reb
Jimmy Powell	Guard	5–11	Junior	0.6 Pts, 0.0 Reb
Dennis Powell	Center	6–0	Junior	0.2 Pts, 0.2 Reb

== Schedule ==
Date time, TV	Rank^{#}	Opponent^{#}	Result	Record	Site city, state
December 3*	No. 2	Auburn	W 86–69	1-0	Carolina Coliseum; Columbia, SC
December 5*	No. 2	at No. 5 Notre Dame	W 85–82	2-0	Purcell Pavilion at the Joyce Center; South Bend, IN
December 12	No. 2	Duke	W 98-78	3-0 (1-0)	Carolina Coliseum; Columbia, SC
December 16	No. 2	Maryland	W 96–70	4-0 (2-0)	Carolina Coliseum; Columbia, SC
December 19*	No. 2	at Virginia Tech	W 78–76	5-0	Cassell Coliseum; Blacksburg, VA
December 26*	No. 2	vs. Cornell	W 83–60	6-0	
December 28*	No. 2	vs. Providence	W 102–86	7-0	
December 30*	No. 2	vs. No. 5 Western Kentucky	W 86–84	8-0	
January 2	No. 2	Clemson	W 81–53	9-0 (3-0)	Carolina Coliseum; Columbia, SC
January 4	No. 2	at North Carolina	L 64–79	9-1 (3-1)	Carmichael Auditorium; Chapel Hill, NC
January 6*	No. 2	Temple	W 84–71	10-1	Carolina Coliseum; Columbia, SC
January 9	No. 2	at Maryland	L 30–31	10-2 (3-2)	Cole Fieldhouse; College Park, MD
January 11	No. 2	at Virginia	L 49–50	10-3 (3-3)	University Hall; Charlottesville, VA
January 30	No. 10	No. 15 Virginia	W 92–70	11-3 (4-3)	Carolina Coliseum; Columbia, SC
February 1	No. 10	at Duke	L 71–82	11-4 (4-4)	Cameron Indoor Stadium; Durham, NC
February 4*	No. 7	at Furman	W 118–83	12-4	Carolina Coliseum; Columbia, SC
February 6	No. 7	at Clemson	W 47–44	13-4 (5-4)	Littlejohn Coliseum; Clemson, SC
February 10*	No. 9	vs. Davidson	W 70–62	14-4	Charlotte Coliseum; Charlotte, NC
February 17	No. 7	North Carolina State	W 79–63	15-4 (6-4)	Carolina Coliseum; Columbia, SC
February 20	No. 7	No. 8 North Carolina	W 72–66	16-4 (7-4)	Carolina Coliseum; Columbia, SC
February 22*	No. 7	Houston	W 88–71	17-4	Carolina Coliseum; Columbia, SC
February 24	No. 7	Wake Forrest	W 84–64	18-4 (8-4)	Carolina Coliseum; Columbia, SC
February 27	No. 7	at NC State	W 82–69	19-4 (9-4)	Reynolds Coliseum; Raleigh, NC
March 6	No. 6	Wake Forrest	W 88–73	20-4 (10-4)	Carolina Coliseum; Columbia, SC
March 11*	No. 6	vs. Maryland; ACC tournament	W 71–63	21-4	Greensboro Coliseum; Greensboro, NC
March 12*	No. 6	vs. NC State; ACC tournament	W 69–56	22-4	Greensboro Coliseum; Greensboro, NC
March 13*	No. 6	vs. No. 13 North Carolina; ACC tournament	W 52-51	23-4	Greensboro Coliseum; Greensboro, NC
March 18*	No. 6	vs. No. 3 Penn; NCAA tournament	L 64-79	23-5	Reynolds Coliseum; Raleigh, NC
March 20*	No. 6	vs. No. 9 Fordham; NCAA tournament • Third Place Game	L 90-100	23-6	Reynolds Coliseum; Raleigh, NC
*Non-conference game. ^{#}Rankings from AP Poll. (#) Tournament seedings in parentheses.

== Rankings ==
Ranking movements Legend: ██ Increase in ranking ██ Decrease in ranking
	Week																
Poll	Pre	1	2	3	4	5	6	7	8	9	10	11	12	13	14	15	Final
AP	2	2	2	2	2	2	2	6	11	10	7	10	7	7	6	6	6
Coaches	2	2	2	2	2	2	2	6	8	9	7	9	9	7	6	7	6

== Gamecocks drafted into the NBA ==
Year	Round	Pick	Player	NBA Club
1971	1	14	John Roche	Phoenix Suns
1971	4	58	Tom Owens	Houston Rockets
