= George Fisher (basketball coach) =

American basketball coach and administrator (1924–2014)

Biographical details
- Born: July 9, 1924; Greenbrier, Tennessee, U.S.
- Died: December 20, 2014 (aged 90); Clarksville, Tennessee, U.S.

Playing career
- 1945–1948: Austin Peay

Coaching career (HC unless noted)
- 1962–1971: Austin Peay

Administrative career (AD unless noted)
- 1972–1977: Austin Peay

Accomplishments and honors

Awards
- French League Best Coach (1987); OVC Coach of the Year (1967)

George D. Fisher (July 9, 1924 – December 20, 2014) was an American college basketball coach and athletic administrator at Austin Peay State University in Clarksville, Tennessee. Fisher, a native of Greenbrier, Tennessee, also attended Austin Peay and played baseball, basketball and football at the school. In 1962, he was named head basketball coach at his alma mater, where he shepherded the program into Division I status and coached the first African-American player in school history.

Following the close of his coaching career, Fisher became the Athletic director at the school and served in this capacity until 1977.
