= 1970–71 North Carolina Tar Heels men's basketball team =

American college basketball season

1970–71 North Carolina Tar Heels men's basketball

NIT Champions ACC Regular Season Champions

NIT, Champions
- Conference: Atlantic Coast Conference

Ranking
- Coaches: No. 13
- AP: No. 13
- Record: 26–6 (11–3 ACC)
- Head coach: Dean Smith (10th season)
- Assistant coach: Bill Guthridge (4th season)
- Home arena: Carmichael Auditorium

1970–71 ACC men's basketball standings
	Conf.				Overall
Team	W		L	PCT	W		L	PCT
No. 13 North Carolina	11	–	3	.786	26	–	6	.813
No. 6 South Carolina †	10	–	4	.714	23	–	6	.793
Duke	9	–	5	.643	20	–	10	.667
Wake Forest	7	–	7	.500	16	–	10	.615
Virginia	6	–	8	.429	15	–	11	.577
NC State	5	–	9	.357	13	–	14	.481
Maryland	5	–	9	.357	14	–	12	.538
Clemson	3	–	11	.214	9	–	17	.346
† 1971 ACC tournament winner Rankings from AP Poll

The 1970–71 North Carolina Tar Heels men's basketball team represented the University of North Carolina at Chapel Hill during the 1970–71 men's college basketball season.

== Schedule ==
Date time, TV	Rank^{#}	Opponent^{#}	Result	Record	Site city, state
December 1*		East Tennessee State	W 109–79		Carmichael Auditorium; Chapel Hill, NC
December 5*		at William & Mary	W 101–72		
December 12*		vs. Creighton	W 106–86		Charlotte, NC
December 15		Virginia	W 80–75		Carmichael Auditorium; Chapel Hill, NC
December 18*	No. 20	vs. NC State; Big Four Tournament	L 70–82		Greensboro, NC
December 19*	No. 20	vs. Duke; Big Four Tournament	W 83–81		Greensboro, NC
December 22*	No. 20	at Utah	L 86–105		Salt Lake City, UT
December 29*	No. 17	vs. Penn State	W 73–57		Greensboro, NC
December 30*		vs. Northwestern	W 98–74		Greensboro, NC
January 2*		vs. Tulane	W 101–79		Charlotte, NC
January 4		No. 2 South Carolina	W 79–64		Carmichael Auditorium; Chapel Hill, NC
January 9	No. 20	Duke	W 79–74		Carmichael Auditorium; Chapel Hill, NC
January 14	No. 15	Clemson	W 92–72		Carmichael Auditorium; Chapel Hill, NC
January 30	No. 15	at Wake Forest	L 84–96		Winston-Salem, NC
January 30	No. 20	Maryland	W 105–79		Carmichael Auditorium; Chapel Hill, NC
February 8	No. 16	at NC State	W 65–63		Raleigh, NC
February 12*	No. 11	vs. Georgia Tech; North-South Doubleheader	W 87–58		Charlotte, NC
February 13	No. 11	vs. Clemson; North-South Doubleheader	W 86–48		Charlotte, NC
February 17	No. 8	at Maryland	W 100–76		College Park, MD
February 20	No. 8	at No. 7 South Carolina	L 66–72		Columbia, SC
February 22*	No. 8	Florida State	W 70–61		Carmichael Auditorium; Chapel Hill, NC
February 27	No. 13	at Virginia	W 75–74		Charlottesville, VA
March 3	No. 12	NC State	W 97–81		Carmichael Auditorium; Chapel Hill, NC
March 6	No. 12	at Duke	L 83–92		Cameron Indoor Stadium; Durham, NC
March 11*	No. 13	vs. Clemson; ACC tournament	W 76–41		Greensboro, NC
March 12*	No. 13	vs. Virginia; ACC Tournament	W 78–68		Greensboro, NC
March 13*	No. 13	vs. No. 6 South Carolina; ACC Tournament	L 51–52		Greensboro, NC
March 20*	No. 13	vs. Massachusetts; NIT	W 90–49		Madison Square Garden; New York, NY
March 22*	No. 13	vs. Providence; NIT	W 86–79		Madison Square Garden; New York, NY
March 25*	No. 13	vs. Duke; NIT	W 73–67		Madison Square Garden; New York, NY
March 27*	No. 13	vs. Georgia Tech; NIT	W 84–66		Madison Square Garden; New York, NY
*Non-conference game. ^{#}Rankings from AP Poll. (#) Tournament seedings in parentheses.
