= 1970–71 Connecticut Huskies men's basketball team =

American college basketball season

1970–71 Connecticut Huskies men's basketball
- Conference: Yankee Conference
- Record: 10–14 (5–5 YC)
- Head coach: Dee Rowe (2nd season)
- Assistant coaches: Billy Kalbaugh; Jim Valvano
- Home arena: Hugh S. Greer Field House

1970–71 Yankee Conference men's basketball standings
	Conf.				Overall
Team	W		L	PCT	W		L	PCT
Massachusetts	10	–	0	1.000	23	–	4	.852
Rhode Island	8	–	2	.800	10	–	17	.370
Connecticut	5	–	5	.500	10	–	14	.417
New Hampshire	3	–	7	.300	11	–	12	.478
Maine	3	–	7	.300	8	–	16	.333
Vermont	1	–	9	.100	9	–	15	.375

The 1970–71 Connecticut Huskies men's basketball team represented the University of Connecticut in the 1970–71 collegiate men's basketball season. The Huskies completed the season with a 10–14 overall record. The Huskies were members of the Yankee Conference, where they ended the season with a 5–5 record. The Huskies played their home games at Hugh S. Greer Field House in Storrs, Connecticut, and were led by second-year head coach Dee Rowe.

== Schedule ==
Date time, TV	Rank^{#}	Opponent^{#}	Result	Record	Site (attendance) city, state
Regular Season
12/5/1970*		at Yale	L 80–94	0–1	Payne Whitney Gymnasium; New Haven, CT
12/9/1970		at New Hampshire	W 74–71	1–1 (1–0)	Lundholm Gym; Durham, NH
12/12/1970*		Boston University	W 64–62	2–1	Hugh S. Greer Field House; Storrs, CT
12/15/1970		Massachusetts	L 68–74	2–2 (1–1)	Hugh S. Greer Field House; Storrs, CT
12/18/1970*		vs. Oklahoma State; Bayou Classic	L 64–80	2–3	Lafayette, LA
12/19/1970*		vs. Yale; Bayou Classic	W 84–76	3–3	Lafayette, LA
1/7/1971		New Hampshire	W 84–79	4–3 (2–1)	Hugh S. Greer Field House; Storrs, CT
1/9/1971		Rhode Island	L 67–75	4–4 (2–2)	Hugh S. Greer Field House; Storrs, CT
1/12/1971*		at Boston College	L 69–71	4–5	Roberts Center; Boston, MA
1/16/1971		Vermont	W 107–82	5–5 (3–2)	Hugh S. Greer Field House; Storrs, CT
1/27/1971*		at Fairfield	L 72–88	5–6	Alumni Hall; Fairfield, CT
1/30/1971		at Maine	L 99–112	5–7 (3–3)	Memorial Gymnasium; Orono, ME
2/2/1971*		Dartmouth	L 62–69	5–8	Hugh S. Greer Field House; Storrs, CT
2/4/1971*		at Georgetown; Rivalry	L 75–98	5–9	McDonough Gymnasium; Washington, D.C.
2/6/1971		Maine	W 88–54	6–9 (4–3)	Hugh S. Greer Field House; Storrs, CT
2/8/1971*		Florida Southern	W 82–74	7–9	Hugh S. Greer Field House; Storrs, CT
2/10/1971*		at Colgate	W 94–76	8–9	Cotterell Court; Hamilton, NY
2/13/1971		at Massachusetts	L 67–89	8–10 (4–4)	Curry Hicks Cage; Amherst, MA
2/15/1971*		Holy Cross	L 78–103	8–11	Hugh S. Greer Field House; Storrs, CT
2/17/1971		at Vermont	W 100–80	9–11 (5–4)	Patrick Gym; Burlington, VT
2/20/1971*		Syracuse; Rivalry	L 76–97	9–12	Hugh S. Greer Field House; Storrs, CT
2/23/1971*		Rutgers	W 70–66	10–12	Hugh S. Greer Field House; Storrs, CT
2/25/1971*		at Manhattan	L 83–86	10–13	New York, NY
2/27/1971		at Rhode Island	L 78–96	10–14 (5–5)	Keaney Gymnasium; Kingston, RI
*Non-conference game. ^{#}Rankings from AP Poll. (#) Tournament seedings in parentheses. All times are in Eastern Time.

Schedule Source:
