= Frank Szymanski (basketball) =

American basketball coach

Biographical details
- Born: March 11, 1937 (age 89)

Playing career

Baseball
- 1956: Daytona Beach Islanders
- 1957: Cocoa Indians
- 1957–1958: Dubuque Packers
- 1959: Waterloo Hawks

Coaching career (HC unless noted)

Men's basketball
- 1960–1968: Baltimore JC
- 1968–1971: Drexel
- 1971–1983: Baltimore

Women's basketball
- 1987–1992: Loyola (MD)

Administrative career (AD unless noted)
- 1971–1983: Baltimore
- 1981–1987: ECAC Metro (commissioner)

Head coaching record
- Overall: 53–104 (.338) (Division I men's basketball); 24–103 (.189) (Division I women's basketball)

Francis Andrew Szymanski (born March 11, 1937) is an American basketball coach who was the men's basketball coach at Baltimore Junior College (1960–1968), Drexel University (1968–1971), and the University of Baltimore (1971–1983) and the women's coach at Loyola College (1987–1992). Prior to coaching, he played Minor League Baseball.

== Baseball ==
Szymanski was a standout baseball player at Baltimore's Patterson Park High School. In 1954 he was named to the All-Scholastic baseball team of newspaper The Baltimore Sun as a first baseman, and as an outfielder in 1955. He was the most valuable player of the 1955 All American Amateur Baseball Association tournament in Johnstown, Pennsylvania, going 10–22 with 2 home runs and 7 runs batted in.

On September 6, 1955, Szymanski signed a $4,000 minor league contract with the Cleveland Indians. He played for the Daytona Beach Islanders in 1956, batting .192 with 10 home runs and 55 RBIs. He batted .247 in 58 games for the Cocoa Indians in 1957, then moved to the Chicago White Sox organization. He played 64 games that season for the Dubuque Packers and hit .279 with 11 home runs and 42 RBIs. He split the 1958 season between the Packers and the Waterloo Hawks, a Boston Red Sox affiliate. He appeared in 59 games between the two clubs and hit 12 home runs and 41 RBI. In 1959, he played baseball at Baltimore Junior College.

== Basketball ==
In 1960, Szymanski became the head men's basketball coach at Baltimore Junior College. In 1968, he took the same job at the Drexel Institute of Technology (later Drexel University). He led the Dragons to a 26–39 record over three seasons and was head coach during their first season at the NCAA Division I level (1970–71).

Szymanski left Drexel in 1971 to become the head basketball coach and athletic director at the University of Baltimore. During his tenure as athletic director, the Bees won the 1975 NCAA Division II soccer tournament and moved to Division I. On the court, the Bees went 46–87 under Szymanski after they moved to Division I. The University of Baltimore ended its athletics program in 1983, but Szymanski remained with the school as a faculty member.

Szymanski was the first commissioner of the ECAC Metro. He served from the conference's founding in 1981 until the league moved its offices from Baltimore in 1987.

In 1987, Szymanski was named head coach of the Loyola Greyhounds women's basketball team. He posted a 24–103 record over five seasons and resigned during the 1991–92 season due to "the team's lack of progress, its won-lost record, and the increased responsibilities of [his] full-time position at the University of Baltimore".
