= John Roche (basketball) =

American basketball player (born 1949)

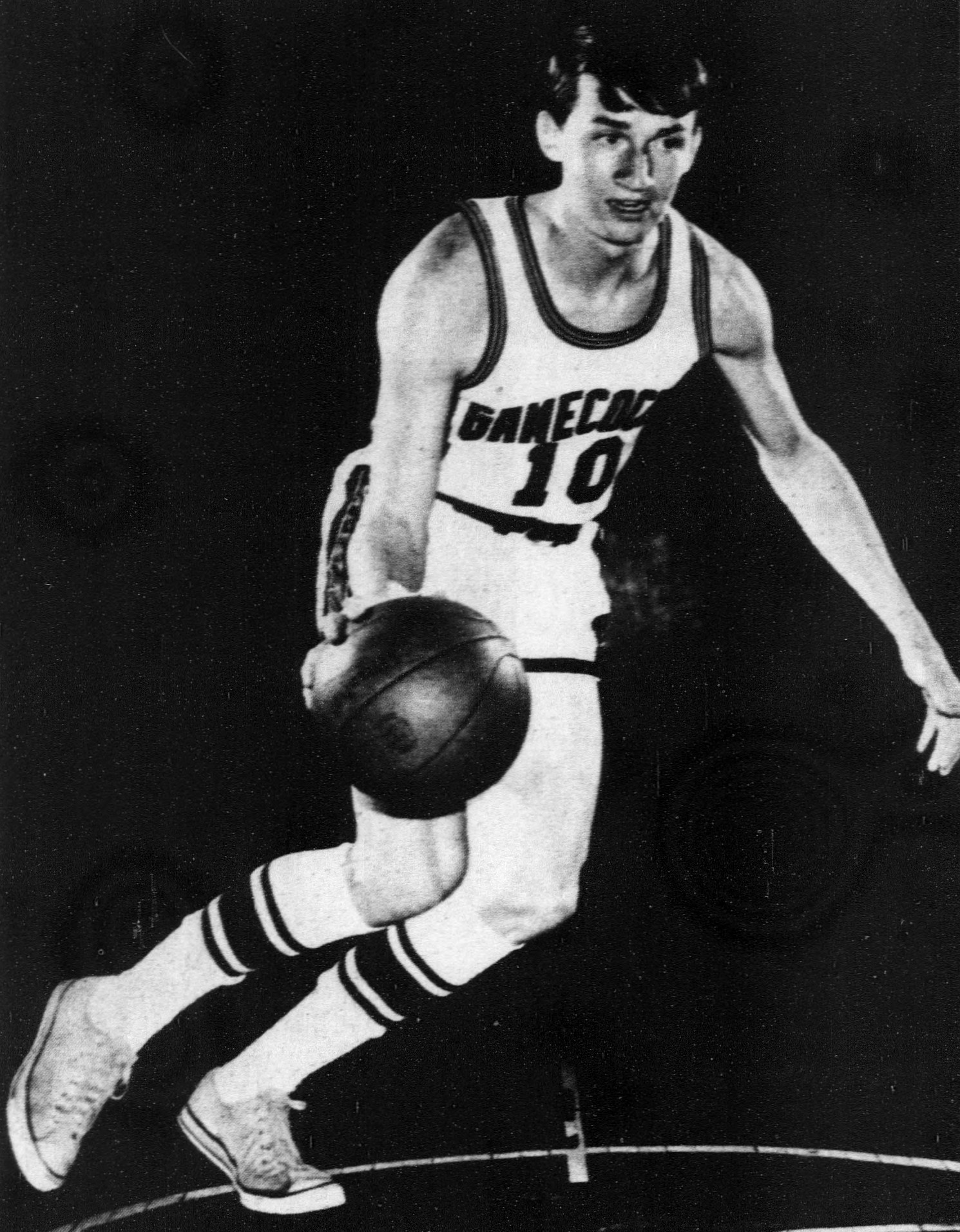
- Roche with South Carolina, circa 1969

Personal information
- Born: September 26, 1949 (age 77) New York City, New York, U.S.
- Listed height: 6 ft 3 in (1.91 m)
- Listed weight: 170 lb (77 kg)

Career information
- High school: La Salle Academy (New York City, New York)
- College: South Carolina (1968–1971)
- NBA draft: 1971: 1st round, 14th overall pick
- Drafted by: Phoenix Suns
- Playing career: 1971–1982
- Position: Point guard
- Number: 13, 11, 15, 10

Career history
- 1971–1974: New York Nets
- 1974–1975: Kentucky Colonels
- 1975: Utah Stars
- 1976: Los Angeles Lakers
- 1977–1978: Sinudyne Bologna
- 1979–1982: Denver Nuggets

Career highlights
- ABA All-Rookie First Team (1972); 2× Consensus second-team All-American (1970, 1971); 2× ACC Player of the Year (1969, 1970); 3× First-team All-ACC (1969–1971); No. 11 retired by South Carolina Gamecocks

Career ABA and NBA statistics
- Points: 5,345 (11.2 ppg)
- Rebounds: 736 (1.5 rpg)
- Assists: 1,880 (3.9 apg)
- Stats at NBA.com
- Stats at Basketball Reference

John Michael Roche (born September 26, 1949) is an American former professional basketball player in both the American Basketball Association (ABA) and the National Basketball Association (NBA). The 6-foot-3-inch (1.91 m), 170 pounds (77 kg) guard's career spanned from 1971 to 1982.

== Amateur ==
Roche attended high school at La Salle Academy and received his B.S. degree in business administration from the University of South Carolina in 1971. While at the University of South Carolina, he was twice named the ACC basketball Player of the Year and was second in the voting in his other varsity year. He was a consensus All-American and Academic All-American basketball player in 1970 and 1971. He was named the 20th best player in the history of the Atlantic Coast Conference on its 50-year anniversary team.

== ABA ==
After graduation, he was selected by the Phoenix Suns in the first round (14th pick) of the 1971 NBA draft and also selected by the Kentucky Colonels in the 1971 ABA Draft. Roche signed with the New York Nets of the ABA, who had obtained the rights to him from the Colonels. He was selected to the 1972 ABA All-Rookie team, and played with the Nets during his first three seasons. During the 1973–74 season, he was traded back to Colonels for Mike Gale and Wendell Ladner.

== NBA, legal education, and brief retirement ==
His NBA rights were traded by Phoenix to the Los Angeles Lakers, with whom he jumped to for the 1975–76 season. After being waived by the Lakers, he put his professional basketball career on hold (save for a season in Italy), as Roche pursued his J.D. (1981) from the University of Denver College of Law.

Roche resumed his NBA career after signing with the Denver Nuggets in 1979, playing three seasons with the Nuggets before retiring after the 1981–82 season.

Roche earned distinction as one of the NBA's leading shooters during the 1979–80 season, ranking fourth in three-point shooting percentage and 10th in free-throw percentage. Roche is the first in NBA history to hit 7 three-point field goals in a single quarter.

== Law ==
Roche is currently an attorney at the Denver office of the law firm Taylor|Anderson. He practiced at Davis, Graham and Stubbs for eighteen years and Snell & Wilmer for nine years before joining Taylor|Anderson in 2009. He is admitted to practice in the State of Colorado, the United States District Court for the District of Colorado and the United States Court of Appeals for the Tenth Circuit, and he is a member of the Colorado and Denver Bar Associations. Roche has also taught Remedies as an adjunct professor at the University of Denver Sturm College of Law.

Roche is a member of the New York City, LaSalle Academy, University of South Carolina and the State of South Carolina Halls of Fame. He is a nine time singles champion of the Denver City Open tennis tournament in his various age groups and a recipient of the Sam & Sid Milstein Award as "outstanding senior male tennis player" for the year 2014 in the Intermountain Colorado region. Roche is also an avid yoga practitioner.
