= 1970–71 Georgetown Hoyas men's basketball team =

American college basketball season

1970–71 Georgetown Hoyas men's basketball
- Conference: Independent
- Record: 12–14
- Head coach: John Magee (5th season)
- Assistant coach: Ed Hockenbury (1st season)
- Captains: Bob Hannan; Don Weber
- Home arena: McDonough Gymnasium

1970–71 NCAA University Division men's basketball independents standings
	Conf.				Overall
Team	W		L	PCT	W		L	PCT
No. 2 Marquette		–		–	28	–	1	.966
No. 9 Fordham		–		–	26	–	3	.897
No. 11 Jacksonville		–		–	22	–	4	.846
No. 15 Duquesne		–		–	21	–	4	.840
Hawaii		–		–	23	–	5	.821
No. 19 Villanova		–		–	27	–	7	.794
St. Bonaventure		–		–	21	–	6	.778
No. 14 Houston		–		–	22	–	7	.759
Utah State		–		–	20	–	7	.741
Syracuse		–		–	19	–	7	.731
Georgia Tech		–		–	23	–	9	.719
Providence		–		–	20	–	8	.714
Fairleigh Dickinson		–		–	16	–	7	.696
Rutgers		–		–	16	–	7	.696
Holy Cross		–		–	18	–	8	.692
No. 12 Notre Dame		–		–	20	–	9	.690
Dayton		–		–	18	–	9	.667
St. John's (NY)		–		–	18	–	9	.667
Denver		–		–	17	–	9	.654
Florida State		–		–	17	–	9	.654
Loyola (LA)		–		–	16	–	10	.615
Marshall		–		–	16	–	10	.615
Colgate		–		–	15	–	10	.600
Saint Francis (PA)		–		–	15	–	10	.600
Pittsburgh		–		–	14	–	10	.583
Boston College		–		–	15	–	11	.577
Northern Illinois		–		–	13	–	10	.565
Southern Illinois		–		–	13	–	10	.565
Creighton		–		–	14	–	11	.560
Virginia Tech		–		–	14	–	11	.560
Manhattan		–		–	13	–	11	.542
Cincinnati		–		–	14	–	12	.538
Detroit		–		–	14	–	12	.538
Niagara		–		–	14	–	12	.538
West Virginia		–		–	13	–	12	.520
Centenary		–		–	13	–	13	.500
Pan American		–		–	13	–	13	.500
Navy		–		–	12	–	12	.500
Air Force		–		–	12	–	14	.462
Georgetown		–		–	12	–	14	.462
Seattle		–		–	12	–	14	.462
Army		–		–	11	–	13	.458
Saint Peter's		–		–	11	–	13	.458
Iona		–		–	10	–	12	.455
Penn State		–		–	10	–	12	.455
George Washington		–		–	11	–	14	.440
Seton Hall		–		–	11	–	15	.423
Long Island		–		–	10	–	15	.400
Butler		–		–	10	–	16	.385
Canisius		–		–	8	–	13	.381
Fairfield		–		–	9	–	15	.375
Hardin–Simmons		–		–	9	–	16	.360
Oklahoma City		–		–	9	–	16	.360
Xavier		–		–	9	–	17	.346
DePaul		–		–	8	–	17	.320
St. Francis (NY)		–		–	8	–	17	.320
Tulane		–		–	8	–	18	.308
Boston University		–		–	7	–	18	.280
Miami (FL)		–		–	7	–	19	.269
NYU		–		–	5	–	20	.200
Portland		–		–	5	–	21	.192
Loyola (IL)		–		–	4	–	20	.167
Rankings from AP Poll

The 1970–71 Georgetown Hoyas men's basketball team represented Georgetown University during the 1970–71 NCAA University Division college basketball season. John Magee coached them in his fifth season as head coach. The team was an independent and played its home games at McDonough Gymnasium on the Georgetown campus in Washington, D.C. The team finished the season with a record of 12–14 and had no post-season play.

== Season recap ==
In recent seasons, Georgetown had established a pattern of strong starts followed by late-season collapses that sank hopes for a berth in a post-season tournament, losing seven of its final 10 games in the 1964–65 season, eight of its final 11 games in 1966–67, and seven of its last nine games in 1968–69. In 1969–70, however, it had played well enough for a bid in the 1970 National Invitation Tournament and had come close to defeating Pete Maravich and his Louisiana State teammates in the first round. With junior forward Art White – generally viewed at the time as the greatest player in Georgetown basketball history – as well as senior guard Don Weber and junior forward Mike Laughna returning, Magee had high hopes that a new era of success had dawned in Georgetown men's basketball.

Laughna had a strong season, shooting 48.2% from the field. Over the course of three consecutive games in February 1971 against American, Loyola, and New York University (NYU), he scored 76 points and pulled down 50 rebounds, and in the NYU game alone he grabbed 11 rebounds and scored 35 points, the only 30-plus-point scoring performance in a single game by a Georgetown player during the 1970s. During the season, he led the team in scoring in 14 games, including 10 of the last 11. White, meanwhile, scored in double figures in 21 of the season's 26 games and averaged 14.2 points per game, and Weber closed out his collegiate career by scoring in double figures 13 times, shooting 44% from the field, and leading the team in assists for the second straight year with 100.

Magee's hope that the 1970–71 team would build on the success of the previous year went unfulfilled: The team played very poorly on defense and, after opening 3–5 and then winning six of its next eight to improve to 9–7, it returned to the pattern of the teams of the latter half of the 1960s, losing seven of its last 10 games. The season culminated in a meeting with longtime rival Fordham, ranked No. 13 in the Associated Press Poll, before a sellout crowd at McDonough Gymnasium on March 4, 1971. Rams guard/forward Charlie Yelverton scored 38 points to lead Fordham to an 81–68 victory that gave the Rams a 22–2 record, and the win clinched Fordham's first bid to the NCAA tournament since 1954.

Georgetown finished the season with a record of 12–14 and had no post-season play. Magee's relationship with the team deteriorated as the season wore on. Praising only Laughna — when asked what lineup he would use for the team the following season, he said, "Laughna and four others" — Magee otherwise openly blamed the year's results on the performance of his players, specifically calling White "a disappointment" in an interview with the campus newspaper The Hoya. White did not return to the team for the following season because of academic issues, presaging a dismal Hoya performance in 1971–72.

The 1970–71 team was not ranked in the Top 20 in the Associated Press Poll or Coaches' Poll at any time.

== Roster ==
#	Name	Height	Weight (lbs.)	Position	Class	Hometown	Previous Team(s)
10	John Connors	6'7"	N/A	G/C	So.	New York, NY, U.S.	Cardinal Spellman HS
12	Don Weber	5'8"	160	G	Sr.	Ridgewood, NJ, U.S.	Don Bosco Preparatory HS
14	Dick Zeitler	5'11"	N/A	G	Sr.	Seaford, NY, U.S.	Archbishop Molloy HS
22	Tim Mercier	5'10"	N/A	G	Sr.	Jersey City, NJ, U.S.	St. Peter's Preparatory School
30	Mike Geoghegan	6'4"	N/A	F	So.	Cincinnati, OH, U.S.	St. Xavier HS
32	Bob Hannan	6'3"	N/A	F	Sr.	Paterson, NJ, U.S.	St. Mary HS
34	Tom McBride	5'10"	N/A	G	So.	South Lake, NJ, U.S.	Staunton Military Academy (Staunton, VA)
40	Ed MacNamara	N/A	N/A	F	Sr.	Dumont, NJ, U.S.	Bergen Catholic HS
42	Mike Laughna	6'7"	210	F	Jr.	North Caldwell, NJ, U.S.	Saint Benedict's Preparatory School
44	Art White	6'7"	190	F	Jr.	White Plains, NY, U.S.	Archbishop Stepinac HS
52	Mark Mitchell	6'8"	N/A	C/F	Jr.	Chicago, IL, U.S.	Loyola Academy
54	Mark Edwards	6'5"	N/A	F	So.	Hyattsville, MD, U.S.	DeMatha Catholic HS

== 1970–71 schedule and results ==
Date time, TV	Rank^{#}	Opponent^{#}	Result	Record	Site city, state
Regular Season
Tue., Dec. 1, 1970 no, no		Rensselaer	W 62–52	1-0	McDonough Gymnasium; Washington, DC
Sat., Dec. 5, 1970 no, no		at St. Joseph's	L 60–72	1-1	Palestra; Philadelphia, PA
Mon., Dec. 7, 1970 no, no		at William & Mary	W 88–71	2-1	George Preston Blow Gymnasium; Williamsburg, VA
Sat., Dec. 12, 1970 no, no		at St. John's	L 74–81	2-2	Alumni Hall; Queens, NY
Wed., Dec. 16, 1970 no, no		at Navy	L 69–76 ^{2OT}	2-3	Halsey Field House; Annapolis, MD
Sat., Dec. 19, 1970 no, no		Maryland	W 96–79	3-3	McDonough Gymnasium; Washington, DC
Tue., Dec. 29, 1970 no, no		vs. Wake Forest; Gold Coast Classic	L 88–90	3-4	West Palm Beach Auditorium; West Palm Beach, FL
Wed., Dec. 30, 1970 no, no		vs. Creighton; Gold Coast Classic	L 79–80	3-5	West Palm Beach Auditorium; West Palm Beach, FL
Sun., Jan. 3, 1971 no, no		Brown	W 80–76	4-5	McDonough Gymnasium; Washington, DC
Thu., Jan. 7, 1971 no, no		Randolph–Macon	W 71–54	5-5	McDonough Gymnasium; Washington, DC
Sat., Jan. 9, 1971 no, no		Boston University	W 95–78	6-5	McDonough Gymnasium; Washington, DC
Wed., Jan. 13, 1971 no, no		at Columbia	L 68–80	6-6	University Gymnasium; New York, NY
Sat., Jan. 16, 1971 no, no		at Seton Hall	L 69–74	6-7	Walsh Gymnasium; South Orange, NJ
Sat., Jan. 30, 1971 no, no		at Fairleigh Dickinson	W 71–59	7-7	Campus Gymnasium; Rutherford, NJ
Mon., Feb. 1, 1971 no, no		at Fairfield	W 78–65	8-7	New Haven Arena; New Haven, CT
Thu., Feb. 4, 1971 no, no		Connecticut; Rivalry	W 98–75	9-7	McDonough Gymnasium; Washington, DC
Sat., Feb. 6, 1971 no, no		at American	L 57–60	9-8	Fort Myer Gymnasium; Fort Myer, VA
Tue., Feb. 9, 1971 no, no		at Loyola Maryland	L 69–75	9-9	Alumni Gymnasium; Baltimore, MD
Thu., Feb. 11, 1971 no, no		at New York University	W 91–80	10-9	Madison Square Garden; New York, NY
Sat., Feb. 13, 1971 no, no		at Rutgers	L 53–58	10-10	College Avenue Gymnasium; New Brunswick, NJ
Tue., Feb. 16, 1971 no, no		Boston College	W 67–66	11-10	McDonough Gymnasium; Washington, DC
Sat., Feb. 20, 1971 no, no		at Penn State	L 75–84	11-11	Recreation Hall; State College, PA
Mon., Feb. 22, 1971 no, no		at George Washington	W 84–76	12-11	Fort Myer Gymnasium; Fort Myer, VA
Wed., Feb. 24, 1971 no, no		at Holy Cross	L 72–109	12-12	Worcester Memorial Auditorium; Worcester, MA
Sat., Feb. 27, 1971 no, no		Manhattan	L 78–86	12-13	McDonough Gymnasium; Washington, DC
Thu., Mar. 4, 1971 no, no		No. 13 Fordham	L 68–81	12-14	McDonough Gymnasium; Washington, DC
*Non-conference game. ^{#}Rankings from AP Poll. (#) Tournament seedings in parentheses.
