= 1970–71 Notre Dame Fighting Irish men's basketball team =

American college basketball season

1970–71 Notre Dame Fighting Irish men's basketball

NCAA Men's Division I Tournament, 3rd place
- Conference: Independent

Ranking
- Coaches: No. 14
- AP: No. 12
- Record: 20–9
- Head coach: John Dee (7th season)
- Home arena: Joyce Center

1970–71 NCAA University Division men's basketball independents standings
	Conf.				Overall
Team	W		L	PCT	W		L	PCT
No. 2 Marquette		–		–	28	–	1	.966
No. 9 Fordham		–		–	26	–	3	.897
No. 11 Jacksonville		–		–	22	–	4	.846
No. 15 Duquesne		–		–	21	–	4	.840
Hawaii		–		–	23	–	5	.821
No. 19 Villanova		–		–	27	–	7	.794
St. Bonaventure		–		–	21	–	6	.778
No. 14 Houston		–		–	22	–	7	.759
Utah State		–		–	20	–	7	.741
Syracuse		–		–	19	–	7	.731
Georgia Tech		–		–	23	–	9	.719
Providence		–		–	20	–	8	.714
Fairleigh Dickinson		–		–	16	–	7	.696
Rutgers		–		–	16	–	7	.696
Holy Cross		–		–	18	–	8	.692
No. 12 Notre Dame		–		–	20	–	9	.690
Dayton		–		–	18	–	9	.667
St. John's (NY)		–		–	18	–	9	.667
Denver		–		–	17	–	9	.654
Florida State		–		–	17	–	9	.654
Loyola (LA)		–		–	16	–	10	.615
Marshall		–		–	16	–	10	.615
Colgate		–		–	15	–	10	.600
Saint Francis (PA)		–		–	15	–	10	.600
Pittsburgh		–		–	14	–	10	.583
Boston College		–		–	15	–	11	.577
Northern Illinois		–		–	13	–	10	.565
Southern Illinois		–		–	13	–	10	.565
Creighton		–		–	14	–	11	.560
Virginia Tech		–		–	14	–	11	.560
Manhattan		–		–	13	–	11	.542
Cincinnati		–		–	14	–	12	.538
Detroit		–		–	14	–	12	.538
Niagara		–		–	14	–	12	.538
West Virginia		–		–	13	–	12	.520
Centenary		–		–	13	–	13	.500
Pan American		–		–	13	–	13	.500
Navy		–		–	12	–	12	.500
Air Force		–		–	12	–	14	.462
Georgetown		–		–	12	–	14	.462
Seattle		–		–	12	–	14	.462
Army		–		–	11	–	13	.458
Saint Peter's		–		–	11	–	13	.458
Iona		–		–	10	–	12	.455
Penn State		–		–	10	–	12	.455
George Washington		–		–	11	–	14	.440
Seton Hall		–		–	11	–	15	.423
Long Island		–		–	10	–	15	.400
Butler		–		–	10	–	16	.385
Canisius		–		–	8	–	13	.381
Fairfield		–		–	9	–	15	.375
Hardin–Simmons		–		–	9	–	16	.360
Oklahoma City		–		–	9	–	16	.360
Xavier		–		–	9	–	17	.346
DePaul		–		–	8	–	17	.320
St. Francis (NY)		–		–	8	–	17	.320
Tulane		–		–	8	–	18	.308
Boston University		–		–	7	–	18	.280
Miami (FL)		–		–	7	–	19	.269
NYU		–		–	5	–	20	.200
Portland		–		–	5	–	21	.192
Loyola (IL)		–		–	4	–	20	.167
Rankings from AP Poll

The 1970–71 Notre Dame Fighting Irish men's basketball team represented the University of Notre Dame during the 1970–71 season.

Guard Austin Carr was the team's captain and leading scorer, averaging 38.0 points per game. After the season, Carr was selected as a first-team player on the 1971 All-America team. Center Collis Jones was the leading rebounder with an average of 13.2 rebounds per game.

The team's sole loss was by a 79–72 score against Drake in the NCAA Tournament.

Following the season, Austin Carr was drafted by Cleveland Cavaliers with the first pick 1971 NBA draft.

== Roster ==
1970–71 Notre Dame Fighting Irish men's basketball team
Players
Coaches

Pos.	#	Name	Height	Weight	Year	Hometown
G	34	Austin Carr	6 ft 4 in (1.93 m)	200 lb (91 kg)	Sr	Washington, D.C.
F	43	Sid Catlett	6 ft 8 in (2.03 m)	230 lb (104 kg)	Sr	Washington, D.C.
G	31	John Egart	5 ft 11 in (1.8 m)	165 lb (75 kg)	Jr	Park Ridge, Illinois
F	44	Doug Gemmell	6 ft 3 in (1.91 m)	185 lb (84 kg)	Jr	Irvington, New Jersey
C	40	Bill Hinga	6 ft 7 in (2.01 m)	190 lb (86 kg)	So	Fort Wayne, Indiana
F	41	Jim Hinga	6 ft 4 in (1.93 m)	200 lb (91 kg)	Sr	Muncie, Indiana
F	42	Collis Jones	6 ft 7 in (2.01 m)	200 lb (91 kg)	Sr	Washington, D.C.
F	30	Bill Lucas	6 ft 4 in (1.93 m)	190 lb (86 kg)	So	Oak Park, Illinois
G	35	Jack Meehan	6 ft 1 in (1.85 m)	181 lb (82 kg)	Sr	Philadelphia, Pennsylvania
C	52	John Pleick	6 ft 8 in (2.03 m)	236 lb (107 kg)	Sr	El Segundo, California
F	53	Jim Regelean	6 ft 8 in (2.03 m)	195 lb (88 kg)	Jr	Lincoln, Nebraska
G	45	Don Silinski	6 ft 3 in (1.91 m)	190 lb (86 kg)	So	Pittsburgh, Pennsylvania
G	32	Thomas Sinnott	6 ft 4 in (1.93 m)	201 lb (91 kg)	Sr	Elizabeth, New Jersey

Head coach

- John Dee

Assistant coach(es)

Legend

- (C) Team captain
- (S) Suspended
- (I) Ineligible
- (W) Walk-on
- Injured
- Current redshirt

== Schedule ==
Date time, TV	Rank^{#}	Opponent^{#}	Result	Record	Site city, state
December 1	No. 5	at Michigan	W 94–81	1–0	Crisler Arena; Ann Arbor, Michigan
December 5	No. 5	No. 2 South Carolina	L 82–85	1–1	Joyce Center; Notre Dame, IN
December 10	No. 6	vs. Northwestern	W 94–88	2–1	Chicago Stadium; Chicago, Illinois
December 12	No. 6	at Saint Louis	W 68–67	3–1	St. Louis Arena; St. Louis, Missouri
December 15	No. 7	No. 13 Indiana	L 103–106	3–2	Joyce Center; Notre Dame, IN
December 29	No. 15	at No. 8 Kentucky	W 99–92	4–2	Freedom Hall; Louisville, Kentucky
December 31	No. 15	Santa Clara	W 85–83	5–2	Joyce Center; Notre Dame, IN
January 2	No. 15	Minnesota	W 97–73	6–2	Joyce Center; Notre Dame, IN
January 10	No. 9	at Air Force	W 75–71	7–2	Clune Arena; Colorado Springs, Colorado
January 12	No. 9	at No. 2 Marquette	L 66–71	7–3	Milwaukee Arena; Milwaukee, WI
January 14	No. 9	Detroit	W 93–79	8–3	Joyce Center; Notre Dame, IN
January 18	No. 9	at Duquesne	L 78–81	8–4	Civic Arena; Pittsburgh, Pennsylvania
January 23	No. 9	No. 1 UCLA	W 89–82	9–4	Joyce Center; Notre Dame, IN
January 26	No. 7	Michigan State	W 104–80	10–4	Joyce Center; Notre Dame, IN
January 30	No. 7	vs. No. 18 Illinois	L 66–69 ^{OT}	10–5	Chicago Stadium (17,000); Chicago, Illinois
February 6	No. 12	Creighton	W 102–91	11–5	Joyce Center; Notre Dame, IN
February 8	No. 9	Butler	W 93–81	12–5	Joyce Center; Notre Dame, IN
February 11	No. 9	at No. 18 Villanova	L 81–99	12–6	Villanova Field House; Philadelphia, Pennsylvania
February 13	No. 9	at DePaul	W 107–76	13–6	Alumni Hall; Chicago, Illinois
February 15		Valparaiso	W 100–75	14–6	Joyce Center; Notre Dame, IN
February 18	No. 14	at No. 18 Fordham	L 88–94	14–7	Madison Square Garden; New York
February 20	No. 14	at West Virginia	W 107–98	15–7	WVU Coliseum; Morgantown, WV
February 23	No. 19	New York	W 106–68	16–7	Joyce Center; Notre Dame, IN
February 27	No. 19	at St. John's	W 92–79	17–7	Alumni Hall; Queens, NY
March 1	No. 16	Dayton	W 83–82	18–7	Joyce Center; Notre Dame, IN
March 4	No. 16	Western Michigan	W 110–79	19–7	Joyce Center; Notre Dame, IN
March 13	No. 14	vs. TCU; NCAA tournament • First Round	W 102–94	20–7	Hofheinz Pavilion; Houston, Texas
March 18	No. 12	vs. No. 18 Drake; NCAA tournament • Semifinal	L 72–79 ^{OT}	20–8	Henry Leavitt Arena; Wichita, Kansas
March 20	No. 12	vs. No. 14 Houston; NCAA tournament • Third Place	L 106–119	20–9	Henry Leavitt Arena; Wichita, Kansas
*Non-conference game. ^{#}Rankings from AP Poll. (#) Tournament seedings in parentheses. MW=Midwest. All times are in Eastern Time.

== Team players drafted into the NBA ==
Round	Pick	Player	NBA club
1	1	Austin Carr	Cleveland Cavaliers
1	17	Collis Jones	Milwaukee Bucks
4	55	Sid Catlett	Cincinnati Royals
