= 1970–71 Washington State Cougars men's basketball team =

American college basketball season

1970–71 Washington State Cougars men's basketball
- Conference: Pacific-8
- Record: 12–14 (2–12 Pac-8)
- Head coach: Marv Harshman (13th season)
- Assistant coach: Jud Heathcote
- Home arena: Bohler Gymnasium

1970–71 Pacific-8 Conference men's basketball standings
	Conf.				Overall
Team	W		L	PCT	W		L	PCT
No. 1 UCLA	14	–	0	1.000	29	–	1	.967
No. 5 USC	12	–	2	.857	24	–	2	.923
Oregon	8	–	6	.571	17	–	9	.654
California	8	–	6	.571	16	–	9	.640
Washington	6	–	8	.429	15	–	13	.536
Oregon State	4	–	10	.286	12	–	14	.462
Washington State	2	–	12	.143	12	–	14	.462
Stanford	2	–	12	.143	6	–	20	.231
As of 1971; Rankings from AP Poll

The 1970–71 Washington State Cougars men's basketball team represented Washington State University for the 1970–71 NCAA college basketball season. Led by thirteenth-year head coach Marv Harshman, the Cougars were members of the Pacific-8 Conference and played their home games on campus at Bohler Gymnasium in Pullman, Washington.

The Cougars were 12–14 overall in the regular season and 2–12 in conference play, tied for last in the standings.

At the end of the season, assistant Jud Heathcote became head coach at the University of Montana.

A fixture in Pullman since 1958, Harshman departed in June for rival Washington in Seattle. Bob Greenwood, an assistant at Iowa and former head coach at Washington University in St. Louis, was hired in July.
