= 1970–71 Western Kentucky Hilltoppers basketball team =

American college basketball season

1970–71 Western Kentucky Hilltoppers basketball

NCAA Mideast Region Champion (Vacated) Ohio Valley Conference Champion

NCAA Tournament, Final Four Third Place (Vacated)
- Conference: Ohio Valley Conference

Ranking
- Coaches: No. 7
- AP: No. 7
- Record: 24–6 (Official record 20–5) (12–2 OVC)
- Head coach: John Oldham
- Assistant coach: Jim Richards
- Home arena: E. A. Diddle Arena

1970–71 Ohio Valley Conference men's basketball standings
	Conf.				Overall
Team	W		L	PCT	W		L	PCT
No. 7 Western Kentucky	12	–	2	.857	24	–	6	.800
Murray State	10	–	4	.714	19	–	5	.792
Eastern Kentucky	10	–	4	.714	16	–	8	.667
East Tennessee State	8	–	6	.571	12	–	12	.500
Austin Peay State	5	–	9	.357	10	–	14	.417
Morehead State	4	–	10	.286	8	–	17	.320
Tennessee Tech	4	–	10	.286	7	–	17	.292
Middle Tennessee	3	–	11	.214	11	–	15	.423
Rankings from AP Poll

The 1970–71 Western Kentucky Hilltoppers men's basketball team represented Western Kentucky University during the 1970–71 NCAA University Division men's basketball season. The Hilltoppers were led by Ohio Valley Conference Coach of the Year John Oldham and consensus All-American player Jim McDaniels. WKU won the OVC season championship, as well as the conference's automatic bid to the 1971 NCAA University Division basketball tournament. No conference tournament was held, so the conference bid was awarded to the season champion. The Hilltoppers advanced to the NCAA Final Four, though the tournament games were later vacated by the NCAA due to McDaniels having signed a contract with an agent.

For the second consecutive year, McDaniels was OVC Player of the Year and set the school record for most points scored in season and career, and highest scoring average. Jerry Dunn and Jim Rose joined McDaniels on the All-OVC Team. This team was one of the most talented in school history with several players being drafted by the NBA and ABA including McDaniels, Dunn, Rose, Clarence Glover, and Jerome Perry.

== Cultural Relevance ==
This year's Western Kentucky team was the first non-historically black Kentucky college to start five African-American players: McDaniels, Rose, Glover, Dunn, and Rex Bailey. Coach Oldham was pressured, and even threatened, not to start all five together, but resisted the pressure saying "they are my best five players".

== NCAA Sanctions ==
WKU's NCAA tournament games were later vacated by the NCAA after it was discovered that McDaniels had signed with a professional agent prior to the tournament. "I admit I made a mistake," McDaniels told the Courier-Journal in an interview. "There was a lot of pressure. I got around some people who did not have my best interests at heart." The sanctions reduced their officially recognized record to 20–5.

== Schedule ==
Date time, TV	Rank^{#}	Opponent^{#}	Result	Record	Site city, state
Regular Season
12/3/1970*	No. 9	ODU	W 96–82	1–0	E. A. Diddle Arena; Bowling Green, KY
12/5/1970*	No. 9	UC Davis	W 88–65	2–0	E. A. Diddle Arena; Bowling Green, KY
12/10/1970*	No. 13	VCU	W 96–71	3–0	E. A. Diddle Arena; Bowling Green, KY
12/12/1970*	No. 13	Duquesne	W 69–62	4–0	E. A. Diddle Arena; Bowling Green, KY
12/19/1970*	No. 11	at Butler	W 100–90	5–0	Hinkle Fieldhouse; Indianapolis, IN
12/23/1970*	No. 10	vs. No. 4 Jacksonville	W 97–84	6–0	Freedom Hall; Louisville, KY
12/26/1970*	No. 10	vs. Saint Peter's; ECAC Holiday Festival	W 108–97	7–0	Madison Square Garden; New York, NY
12/28/1970*	No. 10	at No. 19 St. John's; ECAC Holiday Festival	W 86–67	8–0	Madison Square Garden; New York, NY
12/30/1970*	No. 5	vs. No. 2 South Carolina; ECAC Holiday Festival	L 84–86	8–1	Madion Square Garden; New York, NY
1/2/1971	No. 5	at East Tennessee	W 86–83	9–1 (1-0)	Memorial Center; Johnson City, TN
1/4/1971	No. 5	at Tennessee Tech	W 95–82	10–1 (2-0)	Memorial Gymnasium; Cookeville, TN
1/9/1971	No. 6	Eastern Kentucky	W 83–64	11–1 (3-0)	E. A. Diddle Arena; Bowling Green, KY
1/11/1971	No. 6	Morehead State	W 85–63	12–1 (4-0)	E. A. Diddle Arena; Bowling Green, KY
1/16/1971*	No. 5	at La Salle	L 76–91	12–2	Palestra; Philadelphia, PA
1/23/1971	No. 7	at Murray State	L 71–73	12–3 (4-1)	Racer Arena; Murray, KY
1/25/1971	No. 7	Austin Peay	W 117–72	13–3 (5-1)	E. A. Diddle Arena; Bowling Green, KY
1/30/1971	No. 7	Middle Tennessee	W 80–66	14–3 (6-1)	E. A. Diddle Arena; Bowling Green, KY
2/2/1971	No. 12	at Middle Tennessee	W 87–73	15–3 (7-1)	Murphy Center; Murfreesboro, TN
2/8/1971*	No. 12	at Dayton	L 60–63	15–4	UD Arena; Dayton, OH
2/13/1971	No. 7	Tennessee Tech	W 67–57	16–4 (8-1)	E. A. Diddle Arena; Bowling Green, KY
2/15/1971	No. 7	East Tennessee	W 83–65	17–4 (9-1)	E. A. Diddle Arena; Bowling Green, KY
2/20/1971	No. 9	at Morehead State	W 89–70	18–4 (10-1)	Wetherby Gymnasium; Morehead, KY
2/22/1971	No. 9	at Eastern Kentucky	W 94–93 ^{OT}	19–4 (11-1)	Alumni Coliseum; Richmond, KY
2/27/1971	No. 9	Murray State; Record attendance 14,277	W 73–59	20–4 (12-1)	E. A. Diddle Arena; Bowling Green, KY
3/1/1971	No. 9	at Austin Peay	L 94–96	20–5 (12-2)	Memorial Health Gymnasium; Clarksville, TN
1971 NCAA University Division basketball tournament
3/13/1971*	No. 7	vs. No. 9 Jacksonville; Mideast Region First Round	W 74–72	21–5	Athletic & Convocation Center; Notre Dame, IN
3/18/1971*	No. 7	vs. No. 8 Kentucky; Sweet Sixteen	W 107–83	22–5	Georgia Coliseum; Athens, GA
3/20/1971*	No. 7	vs. No. 10 Ohio State; Mideast Regional Final	W 81–78 ^{OT}	23–5	Georgia Coliseum; Athens, GA
3/25/1971*	No. 7	vs. No. 19 Villanova; Final Four	L 89–92 ^{2OT}	23–6	Astrodome; Houston, TX
3/25/1971*	No. 7	vs. No. 4 Kansas; Final Four Consolation	W 77–75	24–6	Astrodome; Houston, TX
*Non-conference game. ^{#}Rankings from AP Poll; NCAA Tournament Games Vacated. (#) Tournament seedings in parentheses.
