= 1970–71 UCLA Bruins men's basketball team =

American college basketball season

1970–71 UCLA Bruins men's basketball

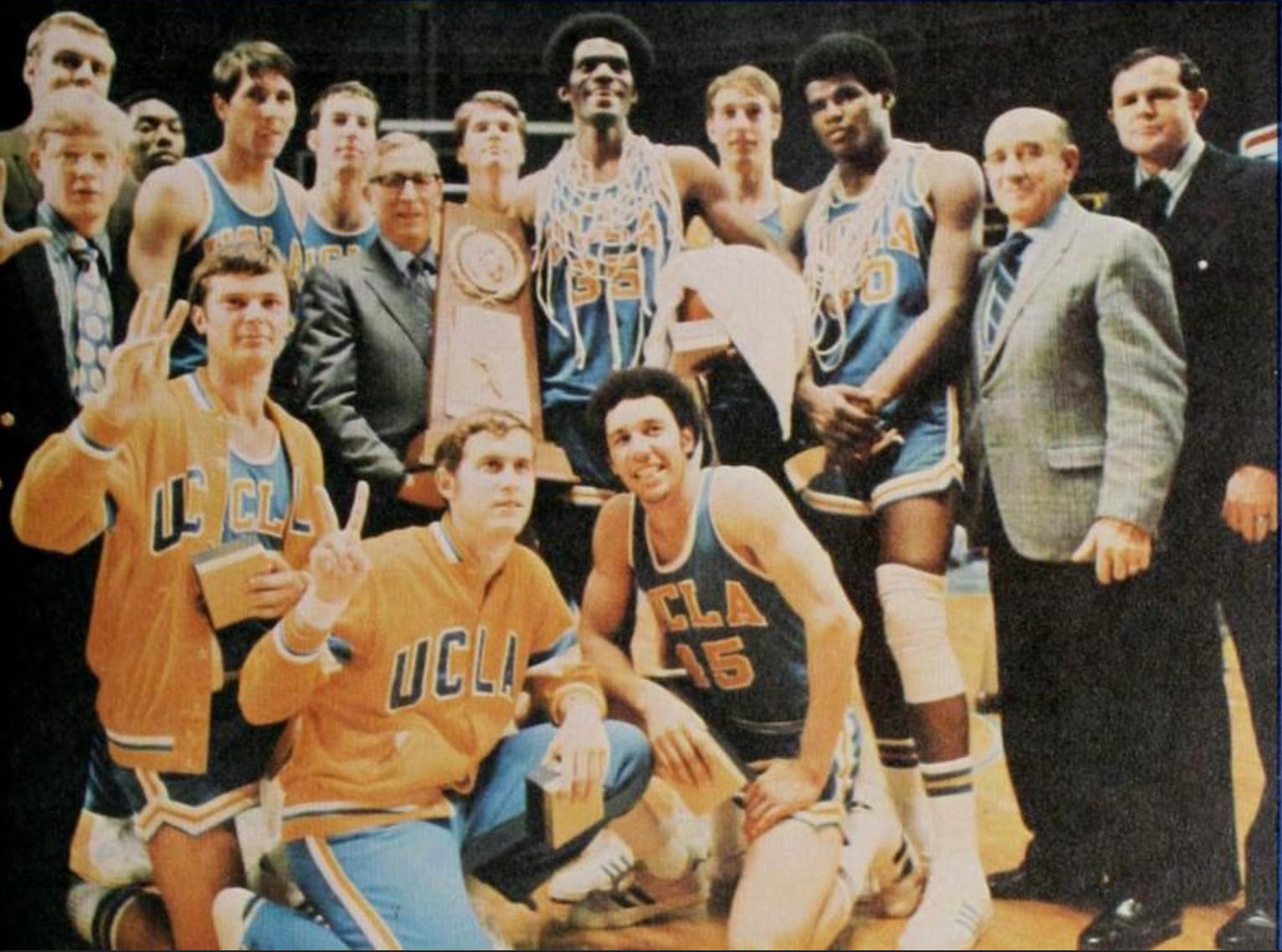
- Celebrating another national championship

NCAA tournament National Champions NCAA regular season champions Pac-8 champions

National Championship Game, W 68–62 vs. Villanova
- Conference: Pacific-8 Conference

Ranking
- Coaches: No. 1
- AP: No. 1
- Record: 29–1 (14–0 Pac-8)
- Head coach: John Wooden (23rd season)
- Assistant coaches: Denny Crum; Gary Cunningham
- Home arena: Pauley Pavilion

1970–71 Pacific-8 Conference men's basketball standings
| | Conf. | | | | Overall |
| Team | W | | L | PCT | W | | L | PCT |
|---|---|---|---|---|---|---|---|---|
| No. 1 UCLA | 14 | – | 0 | 1.000 | 29 | – | 1 | .967 |
| No. 5 USC | 12 | – | 2 | .857 | 24 | – | 2 | .923 |
| Oregon | 8 | – | 6 | .571 | 17 | – | 9 | .654 |
| California | 8 | – | 6 | .571 | 16 | – | 9 | .640 |
| Washington | 6 | – | 8 | .429 | 15 | – | 13 | .536 |
| Oregon State | 4 | – | 10 | .286 | 12 | – | 14 | .462 |
| Washington State | 2 | – | 12 | .143 | 12 | – | 14 | .462 |
| Stanford | 2 | – | 12 | .143 | 6 | – | 20 | .231 |
As of 1971; Rankings from AP Poll

The 1970–71 UCLA Bruins men's basketball team won the National Collegiate Championship on March 27, 1971, in the Astrodome in Houston, Texas. It was UCLA's fifth consecutive national title, and seventh in eight years under head coach John Wooden. The Bruins defeated Villanova 68–62, but the Wildcats' runner-up finish was later vacated by the NCAA.

Smith Barrier, executive sports editor at the Daily News and Record of Greensboro, North Carolina, wrote: "Mister John Wooden has a watch factory out in Los Angeles. It's a bit different from most Swiss works. They don't make watches, they win 'em."

The Bruins' only blemish was an 89–82 loss at Notre Dame on January 23. The victory over UC Santa Barbara on January 30 began UCLA's record 88-game winning streak; it lasted nearly three years, broken on January 19, 1974, again at Notre Dame.

UCLA averaged 83.5 points per game, and allowed 71.1 points. Seniors Sidney Wicks and Curtis Rowe were selected to the consensus All-America team.

The Bruins opened NCAA West Regional in Salt Lake City with a 91–73 win over BYU, then edged Long Beach State 57–55 in the regional final.

At the Final Four in Houston, UCLA defeated fourth-ranked Kansas 68–60 in the semifinal game on Thursday night.

== Roster ==
1970–71 UCLA Bruins men's basketball team
Players
Coaches

| Pos. | # | Name | Height | Weight | Year | Hometown |
|---|---|---|---|---|---|---|
| G | 24 | Rick Betchley | 6 ft 5 in (1.96 m) | — | Sr |
| G | 45 | Henry Bibby | 6 ft 1 in (1.85 m) | — | Jr | Franklinton, North Carolina |
| G | 23 | Kenny Booker | 6 ft 4 in (1.93 m) | — | Sr | Long Beach, California |
| C | 34 | Jon Chapman | 6 ft 6 in (1.98 m) | — |
| G | 22 | Tommy Curtis (redshirt) | 5 ft 11 in (1.8 m) | — |
| F | 52 | John Ecker | 6 ft 6 in (1.98 m) | — | Sr |
| F | 54 | Larry Farmer | 6 ft 5 in (1.96 m) | — | So |
| G | 25 | Andy Hill | 6 ft 1 in (1.85 m) | — | Jr | Los Angeles, California |
| G/F | 53 | Larry Hollyfield | 6 ft 5 in (1.96 m) | — |
| C | 32 | Steve Patterson | 6 ft 9 in (2.06 m) | — | Sr | Riverside, California |
| F | 30 | Curtis Rowe | 6 ft 7 in (2.01 m) | — | Sr | Bessemer, Alabama |
| G | 42 | Terry Schofield | 6 ft 3 in (1.91 m) | — | Sr | Los Angeles, California |
| F | 35 | Sidney Wicks | 6 ft 8 in (2.03 m) | — | Sr | Los Angeles, California |

Head coach

John Wooden (Purdue)

Assistant coach(es)

- Denny Crum (UCLA)
- Gary Cunningham (UCLA)

Legend

- (C) Team captain
- (S) Suspended
- (I) Ineligible
- (W) Walk-on
- Injured
- Current redshirt

Roster
Last update: 2016-Mar-20

== Schedule ==
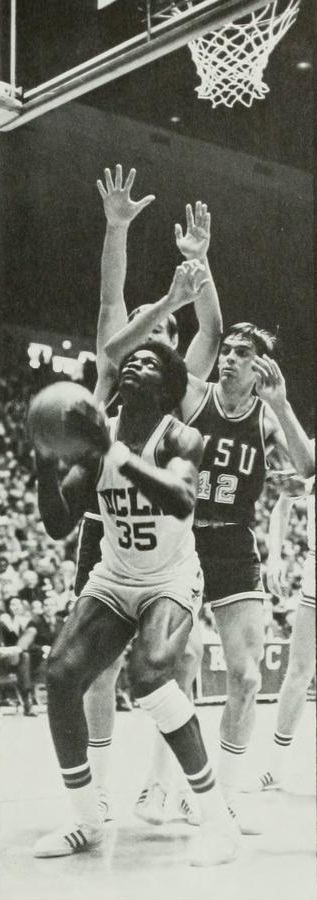
Sidney Wicks was a consensus All-American

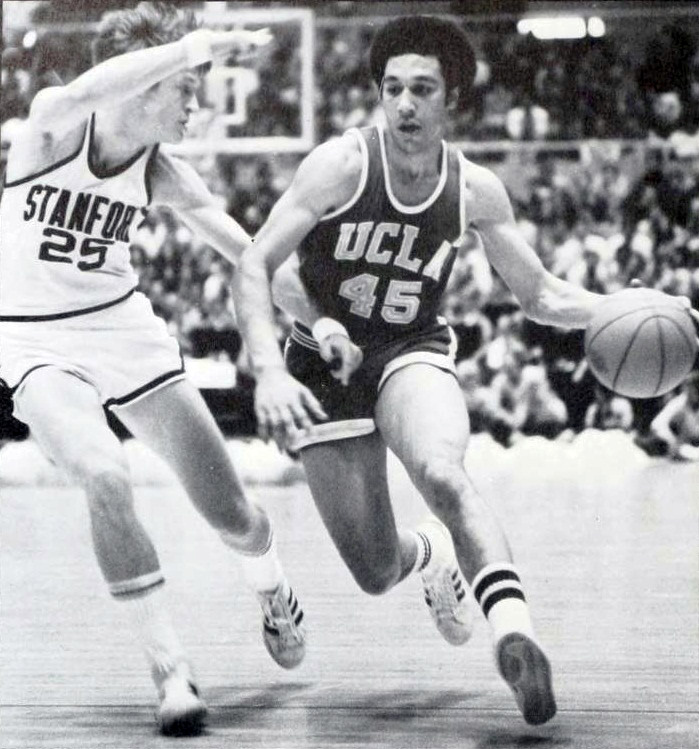
Henry Bibby against Stanford

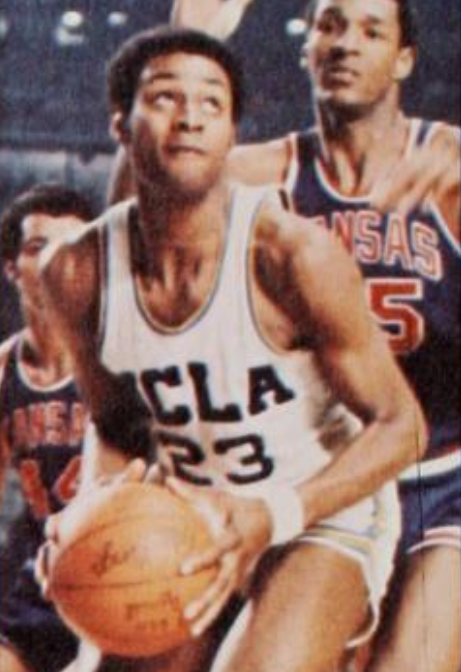
Kenny Booker against Kansas in the Final Four of the NCAA tournament

| Date time, TV | Rank^{#} | Opponent^{#} | Result | Record | Site city, state |
Regular Season
| December 4, 1970* | No. 1 | Baylor | W 108–77 | 1–0 | Pauley Pavilion; Los Angeles |
| December 5, 1970* | No. 1 | Rice | W 124–78 | 2–0 | Pauley Pavilion; Los Angeles, CA |
| December 11, 1970* | No. 1 | Pacific | W 100–88 | 3–0 | Pauley Pavilion; Los Angeles, CA |
| December 12, 1970* | No. 1 | Tulsa | W 95–75 | 4–0 | Pauley Pavilion; Los Angeles, CA |
| December 22, 1970* | No. 1 | Missouri | W 94–75 | 5–0 | Pauley Pavilion; Los Angeles, CA |
| December 23, 1970* | No. 1 | Saint Louis | W 79–65 | 6–0 | Pauley Pavilion; Los Angeles, CA |
| December 29, 1970* | No. 1 | vs. William & Mary; Steel Bowl | W 90–71 | 7–0 | Civic Arena; Pittsburgh, PA |
| December 30, 1970* | No. 1 | at Pittsburgh; Steel Bowl | W 77–65 | 8–0 | Civic Arena; Pittsburgh, PA |
| January 2, 1971* | No. 1 | Dayton | W 106–82 | 9–0 | Pauley Pavilion; Los Angeles, CA |
| January 8, 1971 | No. 1 | Washington | W 78–69 | 10–0 (1–0) | Pauley Pavilion; Los Angeles, CA |
| January 9, 1971 | No. 1 | Washington State | W 95–71 | 11–0 (2–0) | Pauley Pavilion; Los Angeles, CA |
| January 15, 1971 | No. 1 | at Stanford | W 58–53 | 12–0 (3–0) | Maples Pavilion; Stanford, CA |
| January 16, 1971 | No. 1 | at California | W 94–76 | 13–0 (4–0) | Harmon Gym; Berkeley, CA |
| January 22, 1971* | No. 1 | at Loyola–Chicago | W 87–62 | 14–0 | Chicago Stadium; Chicago, IL |
| January 23, 1971* | No. 1 | at No. 9 Notre Dame | L 82–89 | 14–1 | Athletic & Convocation Center; Notre Dame, IN |
| January 30, 1971* | No. 2 | UC Santa Barbara | W 74–61 | 15–1 | Pauley Pavilion; Los Angeles, CA |
| February 6, 1971 | No. 3 | at No. 2 USC | W 64–60 | 16–1 (5–0) | Los Angeles Memorial Sports Arena; Los Angeles, CA |
| February 12, 1971 | No. 1 | at Oregon | W 69–68 | 17–1 (6–0) | McArthur Court; Eugene, OR |
| February 13, 1971 | No. 1 | at Oregon State | W 67–65 | 18–1 (7–0) | Gill Coliseum; Corvallis, OR |
| February 19, 1971 | No. 1 | Oregon State | W 94–64 | 19–1 (8–0) | Pauley Pavilion; Los Angeles, CA |
| February 20, 1971 | No. 1 | Oregon | W 74–67 | 20–1 (9–0) | Pauley Pavilion; Los Angeles, CA |
| February 27, 1971 | No. 1 | at Washington State | W 57–53 | 21–1 (10–0) | Bohler Gymnasium; Pullman, WA |
| March 1, 1971 | No. 1 | at Washington | W 71–69 | 22–1 (11–0) | Hec Edmundson Pavilion; Seattle, WA |
| March 5, 1971 | No. 1 | California | W 103–69 | 23–1 (12–0) | Pauley Pavilion; Los Angeles, CA |
| March 6, 1971 | No. 1 | Stanford | W 107–72 | 24–1 (13–0) | Pauley Pavilion; Los Angeles, CA |
| March 13, 1971 | No. 1 | No. 3 USC | W 73–62 | 25–1 (14–0) | Pauley Pavilion; Los Angeles, CA |
NCAA Tournament
| March 18, 1971*; 8:20 pm | No. 1 | vs. No. 20 BYU; Regional semifinals | W 91–73 | 26–1 | Special Events Center (15,032); Salt Lake City, UT |
| March 20, 1971*; 3:30 pm, NBC | No. 1 | vs. No. 16 Long Beach State; Regional Final | W 57–55 | 27–1 | Special Events Center (14,003); Salt Lake City, UT |
| March 25, 1971*; 6:30 pm, NBC | No. 1 | vs. No. 4 Kansas; National semifinal | W 68–60 | 28–1 | Astrodome (31,428); Houston, TX |
| March 27, 1971*; 1:15 pm, NBC | No. 1 | vs. No. 19 Villanova; National Final | W 68–62 | 29–1 | Astrodome (31,765); Houston, TX |
*Non-conference game. ^{#}Rankings from AP Poll. (#) Tournament seedings in parentheses. All times are in Pacific time.

== Notes ==
- The Bruins also won the "Steel Bowl" in Pittsburgh in late December, defeating William & Mary and Pittsburgh.
- Sidney Wicks was a consensus All-American and Curtis Rowe was named to the second team.
- Sidney Wicks received player of the year awards from the USBWA and The Sporting News.
- November 21, 2010 – Sidney Wicks will be inducted into the National Collegiate Basketball Hall of Fame.
