= 1970–71 Washington Huskies men's basketball team =

American college basketball season

1970–71 Washington Huskies men's basketball
- Conference: Pacific-8 Conference
- Record: 15–13 (6–8 Pac-8)
- Head coach: Tex Winter (3rd season)
- Home arena: Hec Edmundson Pavilion

1970–71 Pacific-8 Conference men's basketball standings
	Conf.				Overall
Team	W		L	PCT	W		L	PCT
No. 1 UCLA	14	–	0	1.000	29	–	1	.967
No. 5 USC	12	–	2	.857	24	–	2	.923
Oregon	8	–	6	.571	17	–	9	.654
California	8	–	6	.571	16	–	9	.640
Washington	6	–	8	.429	15	–	13	.536
Oregon State	4	–	10	.286	12	–	14	.462
Washington State	2	–	12	.143	12	–	14	.462
Stanford	2	–	12	.143	6	–	20	.231
As of 1971; Rankings from AP Poll

The 1970–71 Washington Huskies men's basketball team represented the University of Washington for the 1970–71 NCAA college basketball season. Led by third-year head coach Tex Winter, the Huskies were members of the Pacific-8 Conference and played their home games on campus at Hec Edmundson Pavilion in Seattle, Washington.

The Huskies were 15–13 overall in the regular season and 6–8 in conference play, fifth in the standings.

After the season in May 1971, Winter left to become head coach of the NBA's San Diego Rockets, who moved to Houston that summer. Marv Harshman was hired in June, and he led the Huskies for fourteen seasons. He was previously the head coach at rival Washington State for thirteen years, preceded by thirteen years at his alma mater, Pacific Lutheran.
