= 1970–71 Marquette Warriors men's basketball team =

American college basketball season

1970–71 Marquette Warriors men's basketball

NCAA Men's Division I Tournament, Regional 3rd place
- Conference: Independent

Ranking
- Coaches: No. 2
- AP: No. 2
- Record: 28–1
- Head coach: Al McGuire
- Home arena: Milwaukee Arena

1970–71 NCAA University Division men's basketball independents standings
	Conf.				Overall
Team	W		L	PCT	W		L	PCT
No. 2 Marquette		–		–	28	–	1	.966
No. 9 Fordham		–		–	26	–	3	.897
No. 11 Jacksonville		–		–	22	–	4	.846
No. 15 Duquesne		–		–	21	–	4	.840
Hawaii		–		–	23	–	5	.821
No. 19 Villanova		–		–	27	–	7	.794
St. Bonaventure		–		–	21	–	6	.778
No. 14 Houston		–		–	22	–	7	.759
Utah State		–		–	20	–	7	.741
Syracuse		–		–	19	–	7	.731
Georgia Tech		–		–	23	–	9	.719
Providence		–		–	20	–	8	.714
Fairleigh Dickinson		–		–	16	–	7	.696
Rutgers		–		–	16	–	7	.696
Holy Cross		–		–	18	–	8	.692
No. 12 Notre Dame		–		–	20	–	9	.690
Dayton		–		–	18	–	9	.667
St. John's (NY)		–		–	18	–	9	.667
Denver		–		–	17	–	9	.654
Florida State		–		–	17	–	9	.654
Loyola (LA)		–		–	16	–	10	.615
Marshall		–		–	16	–	10	.615
Colgate		–		–	15	–	10	.600
Saint Francis (PA)		–		–	15	–	10	.600
Pittsburgh		–		–	14	–	10	.583
Boston College		–		–	15	–	11	.577
Northern Illinois		–		–	13	–	10	.565
Southern Illinois		–		–	13	–	10	.565
Creighton		–		–	14	–	11	.560
Virginia Tech		–		–	14	–	11	.560
Manhattan		–		–	13	–	11	.542
Cincinnati		–		–	14	–	12	.538
Detroit		–		–	14	–	12	.538
Niagara		–		–	14	–	12	.538
West Virginia		–		–	13	–	12	.520
Centenary		–		–	13	–	13	.500
Pan American		–		–	13	–	13	.500
Navy		–		–	12	–	12	.500
Air Force		–		–	12	–	14	.462
Georgetown		–		–	12	–	14	.462
Seattle		–		–	12	–	14	.462
Army		–		–	11	–	13	.458
Saint Peter's		–		–	11	–	13	.458
Iona		–		–	10	–	12	.455
Penn State		–		–	10	–	12	.455
George Washington		–		–	11	–	14	.440
Seton Hall		–		–	11	–	15	.423
Long Island		–		–	10	–	15	.400
Butler		–		–	10	–	16	.385
Canisius		–		–	8	–	13	.381
Fairfield		–		–	9	–	15	.375
Hardin–Simmons		–		–	9	–	16	.360
Oklahoma City		–		–	9	–	16	.360
Xavier		–		–	9	–	17	.346
DePaul		–		–	8	–	17	.320
St. Francis (NY)		–		–	8	–	17	.320
Tulane		–		–	8	–	18	.308
Boston University		–		–	7	–	18	.280
Miami (FL)		–		–	7	–	19	.269
NYU		–		–	5	–	20	.200
Portland		–		–	5	–	21	.192
Loyola (IL)		–		–	4	–	20	.167
Rankings from AP Poll

The 1970–71 Marquette Warriors men's basketball team represented Marquette University in NCAA Division I men's competition in the 1970–71 academic year. The Warriors were ranked either No. 1 or No. 2 from January 1971 through the end of the regular season and finished the regular season undefeated with a record of 28–0. The team advanced to the 1971 NCAA University Division basketball tournament where it defeated Miami and SEC champion Kentucky, but lost to Ohio State. The team finished with a 28–1 record.

The team was coached by Al McGuire who was selected by the Associated Press as the college coach of the year for the 1970–71 season. McGuire was later inducted into the Naismith Memorial Basketball Hall of Fame.

Guard Dean Meminger was the team's captain and leading scorer, averaging 21.2 points per game. Center Jim Chones was the leading rebounder with an average of 11.5 rebounds per game. After the season, Meminger was selected as a first-team player on the 1971 All-America team, and Chones received first-team honors on the 1972 All-America team. Meminger and Chones both went on to have successful careers in professional basketball.

The team's sole loss was by a 60–59 score against Ohio State in the NCAA Tournament. Pacific Eight Conference referee Mel Ross called a controversial fifth and final foul on Meminger, depriving Marquette of its most valuable player for the game's final five minutes. After the season, Marquette named referee Ross to its "all-opponent team".

Prior to losing to Ohio State, Marquette had compiled a 39-game winning streak dating back to the previous season.

== Roster ==
1970–71 Marquette Warriors men's basketball team
Players
Coaches

Pos.	#	Name	Height	Weight	Year	Hometown
F	54	Bob Black	6 ft 4 in (1.93 m)	205 lb (93 kg)	Sr	Corning, Arkansas
F	31	Gary Brell	6 ft 6 in (1.98 m)	190 lb (86 kg)	Sr	Milwaukee, Wisconsin
F	22	Jim Chones	6 ft 11 in (2.11 m)	220 lb (100 kg)	So	Racine, Wisconsin
F	50	George Frazier	6 ft 3 in (1.91 m)	185 lb (84 kg)	So	New York
G	33	Gary Grzesk	6 ft 0 in (1.83 m)	172 lb (78 kg)	Jr	Milwaukee, Wisconsin
F	45	Bob Lackey	6 ft 6 in (1.98 m)	200 lb (91 kg)	Jr	Evanston, Illinois
F	30	Guy Lam	6 ft 8 in (2.03 m)	200 lb (91 kg)	Jr	Arlington Heights, Illinois
G	12	Allie McGuire	6 ft 3 in (1.91 m)	175 lb (79 kg)	So	Brookfield, Wisconsin
F	42	Hugh McMahon	6 ft 6 in (1.98 m)	205 lb (93 kg)	Sr	Brooklyn, New York
F	53	Terry McQuade	6 ft 5 in (1.96 m)	190 lb (86 kg)	Jr	Beechurst, New York
G	14	Dean Meminger	6 ft 0 in (1.83 m)	175 lb (79 kg)	Sr	New York
C	11	Mike Mills	6 ft 10 in (2.08 m)	190 lb (86 kg)	So	Milwaukee, Wisconsin
G	25	Mark Ostrand	6 ft 3 in (1.91 m)	170 lb (77 kg)	So	Sturgeon Bay, Wisconsin
F	21	Tom Sonnenberg	6 ft 4 in (1.93 m)	180 lb (82 kg)	Sr	Milwaukee, Wisconsin
G	15	Kurt Spychalla	6 ft 4 in (1.93 m)	180 lb (82 kg)	So	Schofield, Wisconsin

Head coach

- Al McGuire

Assistant coach(es)

- Hank Raymonds

Legend

- (C) Team captain
- (S) Suspended
- (I) Ineligible
- (W) Walk-on
- Injured
- Current redshirt

== Schedule ==
Date time, TV	Rank^{#}	Opponent^{#}	Result	Record	Site city, state
Regular season
December 2		St. John's (MN)	W 87–58	1–0	Milwaukee Arena; Milwaukee, WI
December 5		St. Louis	W 95–72	2–0	Milwaukee Arena; Milwaukee, WI
December 8*		at Minnesota	W 70–61	3–0	Williams Arena; Minneapolis, MN
December 12		Nevada	W 102–74	4–0	Milwaukee Arena; Milwaukee, WI
December 19		Long Beach State	W 83–66	5–0	Milwaukee Arena; Milwaukee, WI
December 23		at North Texas	W 67–57	6–0	Ken Bahnsen Gym; Denton, Texas
December 29		Dartmouth	W 98–55	7–0	Milwaukee Arena; Milwaukee, WI
December 30	No. 3	Wisconsin; Milwaukee Classic	W 72–69	8–0	Milwaukee Arena; Milwaukee, WI
January 2		at Detroit	W 70–61	9–0	Calihan Hall; Detroit, Michigan
January 5		Loyola	W 78–63	10–0	Milwaukee Arena; Milwaukee, WI
January 9		Xavier	W 91–60	11–0	Milwaukee Arena; Milwaukee, WI
January 12	No. 2	No. 9 Notre Dame	W 71–66	12–0	Milwaukee Arena; Milwaukee, WI
January 16		New Mexico State	W 65–53	13–0	Milwaukee Arena; Milwaukee, WI
January 23		DePaul	W 73–51	14–0	Milwaukee Arena; Milwaukee, WI
January 26		Northern Michigan	W 106–57	15–0	Milwaukee Arena; Milwaukee, WI
January 29		at Loyola (IL)	W 87–52	16–0	Alumni Gym
February 2		at Wisconsin	W 89–75	17–0	Wisconsin Field House; Madison, WI
February 6		at DePaul	W 84–55	18–0	Alumni Hall
February 9		UW Milwaukee	W 98–56	19–0	Milwaukee Arena; Milwaukee, WI
February 13		Detroit	W 81–67	20–0	Milwaukee Arena; Milwaukee, WI
February 20		vs. Air Force	W 77–62	21–0	Clune Arena
February 22		at Creighton	W 66–61	22–0	Omaha Civic Auditorium
February 25	No. 2	at No. 11 Fordham	W 85–80	23–0	Madison Square Garden
February 27		Tulane	W 90–76	24–0	Milwaukee Arena; Milwaukee, WI
March 3		at Bowling Green State	W 90–74	25–0	Anderson Arena
March 6		at Xavier	W 76–58	26–0	Cincinnati Gardens
NCAA Tournament
March 13		vs. No. 20 Miami (OH); First Round	W 62–47	27–0	Joyce Center; South Bend, Indiana
March 18		vs. No. 10 Ohio State; Semifinal	L 59–60	27–1	Stegeman Coliseum; Athens, GA
March 20		vs. No. 8 Kentucky; Third Place	W 91–74	28–1	Stegeman Coliseum; Athens, GA
*Non-conference game. ^{#}Rankings from AP Poll. (#) Tournament seedings in parentheses. All times are in Eastern Time.

== Team players drafted into the NBA ==
Round	Pick	Player	NBA club
1	16	Dean Meminger	New York Knicks
3	51	Gary Brell	Milwaukee Bucks
