= 1970–71 St. John's Redmen basketball team =

American college basketball season

1970–71 St. John's Redmen men's basketball

Vanderbilt Invitational Champions

1971 NIT, First round
- Conference: Independent
- Record: 18–9
- Head coach: Frank Mulzoff
- Assistant coach: Chuck McAuley
- Captains: John DeVasto; Pete LaMantia
- Home arena: Alumni Hall; Madison Square Garden

1970–71 NCAA University Division men's basketball independents standings
	Conf.				Overall
Team	W		L	PCT	W		L	PCT
No. 2 Marquette		–		–	28	–	1	.966
No. 9 Fordham		–		–	26	–	3	.897
No. 11 Jacksonville		–		–	22	–	4	.846
No. 15 Duquesne		–		–	21	–	4	.840
Hawaii		–		–	23	–	5	.821
No. 19 Villanova		–		–	27	–	7	.794
St. Bonaventure		–		–	21	–	6	.778
No. 14 Houston		–		–	22	–	7	.759
Utah State		–		–	20	–	7	.741
Syracuse		–		–	19	–	7	.731
Georgia Tech		–		–	23	–	9	.719
Providence		–		–	20	–	8	.714
Fairleigh Dickinson		–		–	16	–	7	.696
Rutgers		–		–	16	–	7	.696
Holy Cross		–		–	18	–	8	.692
No. 12 Notre Dame		–		–	20	–	9	.690
Dayton		–		–	18	–	9	.667
St. John's (NY)		–		–	18	–	9	.667
Denver		–		–	17	–	9	.654
Florida State		–		–	17	–	9	.654
Loyola (LA)		–		–	16	–	10	.615
Marshall		–		–	16	–	10	.615
Colgate		–		–	15	–	10	.600
Saint Francis (PA)		–		–	15	–	10	.600
Pittsburgh		–		–	14	–	10	.583
Boston College		–		–	15	–	11	.577
Northern Illinois		–		–	13	–	10	.565
Southern Illinois		–		–	13	–	10	.565
Creighton		–		–	14	–	11	.560
Virginia Tech		–		–	14	–	11	.560
Manhattan		–		–	13	–	11	.542
Cincinnati		–		–	14	–	12	.538
Detroit		–		–	14	–	12	.538
Niagara		–		–	14	–	12	.538
West Virginia		–		–	13	–	12	.520
Centenary		–		–	13	–	13	.500
Pan American		–		–	13	–	13	.500
Navy		–		–	12	–	12	.500
Air Force		–		–	12	–	14	.462
Georgetown		–		–	12	–	14	.462
Seattle		–		–	12	–	14	.462
Army		–		–	11	–	13	.458
Saint Peter's		–		–	11	–	13	.458
Iona		–		–	10	–	12	.455
Penn State		–		–	10	–	12	.455
George Washington		–		–	11	–	14	.440
Seton Hall		–		–	11	–	15	.423
Long Island		–		–	10	–	15	.400
Butler		–		–	10	–	16	.385
Canisius		–		–	8	–	13	.381
Fairfield		–		–	9	–	15	.375
Hardin–Simmons		–		–	9	–	16	.360
Oklahoma City		–		–	9	–	16	.360
Xavier		–		–	9	–	17	.346
DePaul		–		–	8	–	17	.320
St. Francis (NY)		–		–	8	–	17	.320
Tulane		–		–	8	–	18	.308
Boston University		–		–	7	–	18	.280
Miami (FL)		–		–	7	–	19	.269
NYU		–		–	5	–	20	.200
Portland		–		–	5	–	21	.192
Loyola (IL)		–		–	4	–	20	.167
Rankings from AP Poll

The 1970–71 St. John's Redmen basketball team represented St. John's University during the 1970–71 NCAA Division I men's basketball season. The team was coached by Frank Mulzoff in his first year at the school after Lou Carnesecca left to become the head coach of the New York Nets in the American Basketball Association. St. John's home games are played at Alumni Hall and Madison Square Garden.

The Redmen qualified for the National Invitation Tournament, where they lost to Tennessee in the first round.

== Roster ==
1970–71 St. John's Red Storm men's basketball team
Players
Coaches

Pos.	#	Name	Height	Weight	Year	Previous school	Hometown
G	5	Richard Lyons	6 ft 0 in (1.83 m)	165 lb (75 kg)	Jr	Holy Cross	New Hyde Park, NY
G	10	Larry Jenkins	5 ft 11 in (1.8 m)	160 lb (73 kg)	So	Andrew Jackson	Queens Village, NY
G/F	11	Ron Rutledge	6 ft 5 in (1.96 m)	180 lb (82 kg)	So	Rockwood Prep (MA)	Jamaica, NY
G/F	15	Billy Schaeffer	6 ft 5 in (1.96 m)	200 lb (91 kg)	So	Holy Cross	Bellerose, NY
G	20	Mike Keilty	6 ft 4 in (1.93 m)	190 lb (86 kg)	Jr	Holy Trinity	Woodside, NY
G	22	Frank Hoehleinn	6 ft 3 in (1.91 m)	175 lb (79 kg)	Jr	Sanford H. Calhoun	Merrick, NY
C	24	Bill Phillips	7 ft 0 in (2.13 m)	215 lb (98 kg)	Jr	Jamaica	Hollis, NY
G/F	25	Pete LaMantia (C)	6 ft 3 in (1.91 m)	185 lb (84 kg)	Sr	Bishop Reilly	Bayside, NY
F	33	Mel Davis	6 ft 6.5 in (1.99 m)	217 lb (98 kg)	So	Boys	Brooklyn, NY
F/C	34	Ed Searcy (redshirt)	6 ft 6 in (1.98 m)	210 lb (95 kg)	So	Power Memorial/Duquesne	New York, NY
G	35	John DeVasto (C)	6 ft 0 in (1.83 m)	150 lb (68 kg)	Sr	Loyola	Bronx, NY
F/C	44	Greg Cluess	6 ft 8 in (2.03 m)	215 lb (98 kg)	Jr	St. Agnes (NY)	West Hempstead, NY
F	55	Tony Prince	6 ft 7 in (2.01 m)	190 lb (86 kg)	So	Bishop Loughlin	South Ozone Park, NY

Head coach

- Frank Mulzoff (St. John's, '51)

Assistant coach(es)

- Chuck McAuley
- Joel de Angelis (freshmen coach)

Legend

- (C) Team captain
- (S) Suspended
- (I) Ineligible
- (W) Walk-on
- Injured
- Current redshirt

== Schedule and results ==
Date time, TV	Rank^{#}	Opponent^{#}	Result	Record	Site city, state
Regular Season
12/05/70*		vs. American	W 83-75	1-0	McDonough Gymnasium; Washington, D.C.
12/09/70*		at St. Joseph's	W 66-53	2-0	The Palestra; Philadelphia, PA
12/12/70*		Georgetown	W 80-74	3-0	Alumni Hall; Queens, NY
12/15/70*		Rhode Island	W 77-71	4-0	Alumni Hall; Queens, NY
12/18/70*		vs. Southern Methodist; Vanderbilt Invitational Semifinal	W 95-80	5-0	Memorial Gymnasium; Nashville, TN
12/19/70*		at Vanderbilt; Vanderbilt Invitational Championship	W 85-81	6-0	Memorial Gymnasium; Nashville, TN
12/22/70*	No. 19	Boston College	L 66-69	6-1	Alumni Hall; Queens, NY
12/26/70*	No. 19	vs. Holy Cross; ECAC Holiday Festival Quarterfinal	W 75-74 ^{OT}	7-1	Madison Square Garden; New York, NY
12/28/70*	No. 19	vs. No. 10 Western Kentucky; ECAC Holiday Festival Semifinal	L 67-86	7-2	Madison Square Garden; New York, NY
12/30/70*		vs. Providence; ECAC Holiday Festival Consolation	L 80-94	7-3	Madison Square Garden; New York, NY
01/09/71*		Hawaii	W 82-76	8-3	Alumni Hall; Queens, NY
01/16/71*		West Virginia	W 110-86	9-3	Alumni Hall; Queens, NY
01/20/71*		at Seton Hall	W 88-70	10-3	Walsh Gymnasium; South Orange, NJ
01/23/71*		St. Francis (NY)	W 98-57	11-3	Alumni Hall; Queens, NY
01/26/71*		at Davidson	L 54-56	11-4	Charlotte Coliseum; Charlotte, NC
01/30/71*		Dartmouth	W 66-56	12-4	Alumni Hall; Queens, NY
02/02/71*		at No. 17 Villanova	L 82-99	12-5	Villanova Field House; Villanova, PA
02/06/71*		at Army	W 63-55	13-5	USMA Fieldhouse; West Point, NY
02/11/71*		Niagara	W 82-71	14-5	Alumni Hall; Queens, NY
02/13/71*		No. 20 Fordham	L 72-76	14-6	Madison Square Garden; New York, NY
02/17/71*		at Syracuse	L 73-78	14-7	Manley Field House; Syracuse, NY
02/20/71*		Temple	W 74-67	15-7	Alumni Hall; Queens, NY
02/27/71*		No. 19 Notre Dame	L 79-92	15-8	Alumni Hall; Queens, NY
03/02/71*		at Holy Cross	W 89-74	16-8	Worcester Auditorium; Worcester, MA
03/06/71*		Providence	W 79-65	17-8	Alumni Hall; Queens, NY
03/11/71*		NYU	W 85-74	18-8	Madison Square Garden; New York, NY
NIT Tournament
03/20/71*		vs. No. 17 Tennessee; NIT First Round	L 83-84 ^{OT}	18-9	Madison Square Garden; New York, NY
*Non-conference game. ^{#}Rankings from AP Poll. (#) Tournament seedings in parentheses.
