= 1970–71 Pacific Tigers men's basketball team =

American college basketball season

1970–71 Pacific Tigers men's basketball

West Coast Athletic Conference Champions

NCAA tournament
- Conference: West Coast Athletic Conference
- Record: 22–6 (12–2 WCAC)
- Head coach: Dick Edwards
- Home arena: Pacific Pavilion

1970-71 WCAC men's basketball standings
	Conf.				Overall
Team	W		L	PCT	W		L	PCT
Pacific	12	–	2	.857	22	–	6	.786
Loyola (Calif.)	10	–	4	.714	15	–	10	.600
UNLV	9	–	5	.643	16	–	10	.615
Santa Clara	8	–	6	.571	11	–	15	.423
San Francisco	8	–	6	.571	10	–	16	.385
Pepperdine	4	–	10	.286	12	–	13	.480
Saint Mary's	4	–	10	.286	10	–	16	.385
Nevada	1	–	13	.071	3	–	23	.115
Rankings from AP Poll

The 1970–71 Pacific Tigers men's basketball team represented the University of Pacific during the 1970–71 NCAA Division I men's basketball season. Led by coach Dick Edwards, Pacific compiled a 22–6 record.

Center John Gianelli was the team's captain and leading scorer, averaging 21.4 points per game and 18.2 rebounds.

== Schedule ==
Date time, TV	Rank^{#}	Opponent^{#}	Result	Record	Site city, state
December 1*		Hayward State	W 98–53	1–0	Pacific Pavilion; Stockton, California
December 5*		at Fresno State	W 58–56	2–0	Selland Arena; Fresno, California
December 11*		UCLA	L 88–100	2–1	Pacific Pavilion; Stockton, California
December 12*		Wyoming	W 84–69	3–1	Pacific Pavilion; Stockton, California
December 14*		at Portland	W 72–60	4–1	Howard Hall
December 18*		at Seattle	L 75–77	4–2	KeyArena; Seattle, Washington
December 21*		Western Michigan	W 87–47	5–2	Pacific Pavilion; Stockton, California
December 23*		at San Jose State	W 74–68	6–2	Spartan Gym; San Jose, California
December 28*		vs. Texas Tech	L 80–84	6–3	
December 29*		vs. Seattle	W 80–70	7–3	
January 7		Santa Clara	W 72–60	8–3 (1–0)	Pacific Pavilion; Stockton, California
January 9		at San Francisco	L 64–72	8–4 (1–1)	War Memorial Gymnasium; San Francisco, California
January 14		UNLV	W 95–77	9–4 (2–1)	Pacific Pavilion; Stockton, California
January 16		at Nevada	W 95–61	10–4 (3–1)	Virginia Street Gym
January 23		at Santa Clara	L 78–80	10–5 (3–2)	San Jose Civic; San Jose, California
January 27*		San Jose State	W 103–87	11–5 (3–2)	Pacific Pavilion; Stockton, California
January 30		at Saint Mary's (CA)	W 103–81	12–5 (4–2)	Madigan Gym
February 4		Pepperdine	W 80–55	13–5 (5–2)	Pacific Pavilion; Stockton, California
February 6		Loyola Marymount	W 85–66	14–5 (6–2)	Pacific Pavilion; Stockton, California
February 8*		San Diego State	W 110–83	15–5 (6–2)	Pacific Pavilion; Stockton, California
February 13		San Francisco	W 81–63	16–5 (7–2)	Pacific Pavilion; Stockton, California
February 18		at UNLV	W 98–77	17–5 (8–2)	Las Vegas Convention Center; Paradise, Nevada
February 20		Nevada	W 96–77	18–5 (9–2)	Pacific Pavilion; Stockton, California
February 25		at Pepperdine	W 68–63	19–5 (10–2)	Campus Gym
February 27		at Loyola Marymount	W 88–75	20–5 (11–2)	Loyola Memorial Gymnasium
March 6		Saint Mary's (CA)	W 116–71	21–5 (12–2)	Pacific Pavilion; Stockton, California
NCAA Tournament
March 18*		vs. Long Beach State; Semifinals	L 65–78	21–6 (12–2)	Jon M. Huntsman Center; Salt Lake City, Utah
March 20*		vs. BYU; Third Place	W 84–81	22–6 (12–2)	Jon M. Huntsman Center; Salt Lake City, Utah
*Non-conference game. ^{#}Rankings from AP Poll. (#) Tournament seedings in parentheses.
