= 1970–71 Valparaiso Crusaders men's basketball team =

American college basketball season

1970–71 Valparaiso Crusaders men's basketball
- Conference: Indiana Collegiate Conference
- Record: 13-13 (4-4 Indiana Collegiate)
- Head coach: Bill Purden (1st season)
- Home arena: Hilltop Gym

The 1970–71 Valparaiso Crusaders men's basketball team represented Valparaiso University during the 1970–71 NCAA College Division men's basketball season.

== Roster ==
1970–71 Valparaiso Crusaders men's basketball team
Players	Coaches
Pos. / # / Name / Height / Weight / Year / Hometown; F / / John Wolfenberg / 6 ft 8 in (2.03 m) / 185 lb (84 kg) / So / Wauwatosa, Wisconsin	Head coach: Bill Purden; Assistant coach(es) Legend: (C) Team captain; (S) Suspended; (I) Ineligible; (W) Walk-on; Injured; Current redshirt

== Schedule ==
Date time, TV	Rank^{#}	Opponent^{#}	Result	Record	Site city, state
December 3		at Purdue	L 61–80	0–1	Mackey Arena; West Lafayette, Indiana
December 5		MacMurray	L 68–78	0–2	Hilltop Gym; Valparaiso, Indiana
December 7		at Air Force	L 80–91	0–3	Clune Arena; Colorado Springs, Colorado
December 11		Luther	W 78–76	1–3	Hilltop Gym; Valparaiso, Indiana
December 12		Saint Olaf	W 109–79	2–3	Hilltop Gym; Valparaiso, Indiana
December 15		Wabash	W 83–79	3–3	Hilltop Gym; Valparaiso, Indiana
December 19		at Northwestern	L 49–76	3–4	Welsh–Ryan Arena; Evanston, Illinois
December 28		vs. Long Island	L 52–73	3–5	Springfield, Massachusetts
December 29		vs. American International	W 78–61	4–5	Springfield, Massachusetts
December 30		at Springfield	L 49–54	4–6	Springfield, Massachusetts
January 2		Harvard	W 82–79	5–6	Hilltop Gym; Valparaiso, Indiana
January 6		Saint Joseph’s (IN)	L 85–90	5–7	Hilltop Gym; Valparaiso, Indiana
January 9		at Evansville	L 73–77	5–8	
January 13		at Ball State	L 72–89	5–9	
January 23		Indiana State	L 70–87	5–10	Hilltop Gym; Valparaiso, Indiana
January 30		Tulane	W 66–65	6–10	Hilltop Gym; Valparaiso, Indiana
February 3		at Butler	L 86–91	6–11	
February 6		DePauw	W 97–75	7–11	Hilltop Gym; Valparaiso, Indiana
February 10		Evansville	L 80–89	7–12	Hilltop Gym; Valparaiso, Indiana
February 13		Lakeland	W 78–53	8–12	Hilltop Gym; Valparaiso, Indiana
February 15		at Notre Dame	L 75–100	8–13	Joyce Center; Notre Dame, Indiana
February 17		at Loyola	W 71–60	9–13	
February 20		Butler	W 95–82	10–13	Hilltop Gym; Valparaiso, Indiana
February 23		at DePauw	W 84–65	11–13	
February 27		Indiana Central	W 69–58	12–13	Hilltop Gym; Valparaiso, Indiana
March 1		at St. Joseph’s	W 79–76	13–13	
*Non-conference game. ^{#}Rankings from AP Poll. (#) Tournament seedings in parentheses.
