= 1970–71 Houston Cougars men's basketball team =

American college basketball season

1970–71 Houston Cougars men's basketball
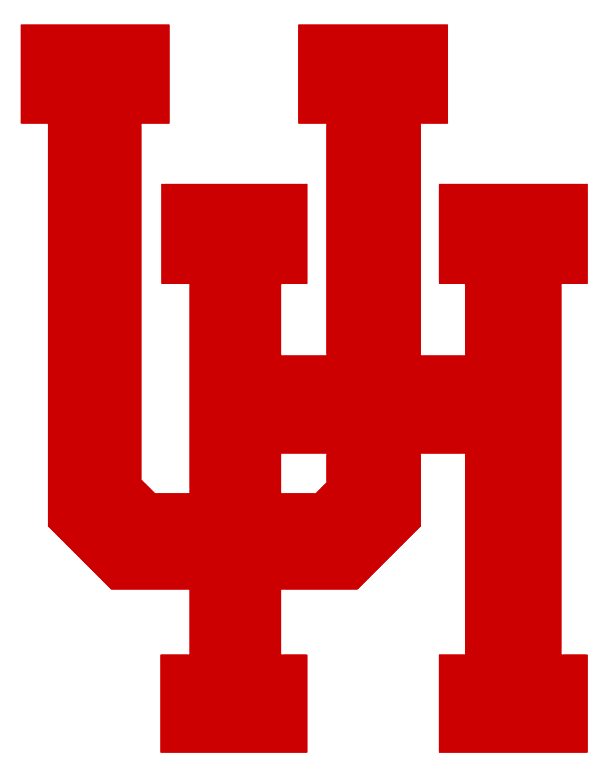

NCAA tournament, Regional Semifinals
- Conference: Independent

Ranking
- Coaches: No. 18
- AP: No. 14
- Record: 22–7
- Head coach: Guy Lewis (15th season)
- Assistant coaches: Harvey Pate; Don Schverak
- Home arena: Hofheinz Pavilion

1970–71 NCAA University Division men's basketball independents standings
	Conf.				Overall
Team	W		L	PCT	W		L	PCT
No. 2 Marquette		–		–	28	–	1	.966
No. 9 Fordham		–		–	26	–	3	.897
No. 11 Jacksonville		–		–	22	–	4	.846
No. 15 Duquesne		–		–	21	–	4	.840
Hawaii		–		–	23	–	5	.821
No. 19 Villanova		–		–	27	–	7	.794
St. Bonaventure		–		–	21	–	6	.778
No. 14 Houston		–		–	22	–	7	.759
Utah State		–		–	20	–	7	.741
Syracuse		–		–	19	–	7	.731
Georgia Tech		–		–	23	–	9	.719
Providence		–		–	20	–	8	.714
Fairleigh Dickinson		–		–	16	–	7	.696
Rutgers		–		–	16	–	7	.696
Holy Cross		–		–	18	–	8	.692
No. 12 Notre Dame		–		–	20	–	9	.690
Dayton		–		–	18	–	9	.667
St. John's (NY)		–		–	18	–	9	.667
Denver		–		–	17	–	9	.654
Florida State		–		–	17	–	9	.654
Loyola (LA)		–		–	16	–	10	.615
Marshall		–		–	16	–	10	.615
Colgate		–		–	15	–	10	.600
Saint Francis (PA)		–		–	15	–	10	.600
Pittsburgh		–		–	14	–	10	.583
Boston College		–		–	15	–	11	.577
Northern Illinois		–		–	13	–	10	.565
Southern Illinois		–		–	13	–	10	.565
Creighton		–		–	14	–	11	.560
Virginia Tech		–		–	14	–	11	.560
Manhattan		–		–	13	–	11	.542
Cincinnati		–		–	14	–	12	.538
Detroit		–		–	14	–	12	.538
Niagara		–		–	14	–	12	.538
West Virginia		–		–	13	–	12	.520
Centenary		–		–	13	–	13	.500
Pan American		–		–	13	–	13	.500
Navy		–		–	12	–	12	.500
Air Force		–		–	12	–	14	.462
Georgetown		–		–	12	–	14	.462
Seattle		–		–	12	–	14	.462
Army		–		–	11	–	13	.458
Saint Peter's		–		–	11	–	13	.458
Iona		–		–	10	–	12	.455
Penn State		–		–	10	–	12	.455
George Washington		–		–	11	–	14	.440
Seton Hall		–		–	11	–	15	.423
Long Island		–		–	10	–	15	.400
Butler		–		–	10	–	16	.385
Canisius		–		–	8	–	13	.381
Fairfield		–		–	9	–	15	.375
Hardin–Simmons		–		–	9	–	16	.360
Oklahoma City		–		–	9	–	16	.360
Xavier		–		–	9	–	17	.346
DePaul		–		–	8	–	17	.320
St. Francis (NY)		–		–	8	–	17	.320
Tulane		–		–	8	–	18	.308
Boston University		–		–	7	–	18	.280
Miami (FL)		–		–	7	–	19	.269
NYU		–		–	5	–	20	.200
Portland		–		–	5	–	21	.192
Loyola (IL)		–		–	4	–	20	.167
Rankings from AP Poll

The 1970–71 Houston Cougars men's basketball team represented the University of Houston in NCAA University Division competition in the 1970–71 season.

Houston, coached by Guy Lewis, played its home games in the Hofheinz Pavilion in Houston, Texas, and was then an Independent.

== Roster ==
1970–71 Houston Cougars men's basketball team
Players
Coaches

Pos.	#	Name	Height	Weight	Year	Previous school	Hometown
F	12	Dwight Jones	6 ft 10 in (2.08 m)	210 lb (95 kg)	So	Wheatley HS	Houston, Texas
G	24	Poo Welch	6 ft 3 in (1.91 m)	—	Sr	Tyler JC	Lake Charles, Louisiana
F	42	Dwight Davis	6 ft 8 in (2.03 m)	220 lb (100 kg)	Jr	Worthing HS	Houston, Texas
F	52	Steve Newsome	6 ft 8 in (2.03 m)	—	So		Columbia, Missouri

Head coach

- Guy Lewis (Houston)

Assistant coach(es)

- Harvey Pate (Oklahoma State)
- Don Schverak (Houston)

Legend

- (C) Team captain
- (S) Suspended
- (I) Ineligible
- (W) Walk-on
- Injured
- Current redshirt

Roster

== Schedule and results ==
Date time, TV	Rank^{#}	Opponent^{#}	Result	Record	Site city, state
Regular season
Dec 3, 1970	No. 17	Northwestern State	W 81–68	1–0	Hofheinz Pavilion; Houston, Texas
Dec 5, 1970	No. 17	at Tennessee	L 58–79	1–1	Stokely Athletic Center; Knoxville, Tennessee
Dec 7, 1970		at Florida	W 61–60	2–1	Florida Gymnasium; Gainesville, Florida
Dec 11, 1970		Tulane; Bluebonnet Classic	W 91–60	3–1	Hofheinz Pavilion; Houston, Texas
Dec 12, 1970		No. 18 Oregon; Bluebonnet Classic	W 81–68	4–1	Hofheinz Pavilion; Houston, Texas
Dec 18, 1970		vs. No. 10 Villanova; Jayhawk Classic	W 99–84	5–1	Allen Fieldhouse; Lawrence, Kansas
Dec 19, 1970		at No. 12 Kansas; Jayhawk Classic	L 73–89	5–2	Allen Fieldhouse; Lawrence, Kansas
Dec 21, 1970		Auburn	W 79–76	6–2	Hofheinz Pavilion; Houston, Texas
Dec 29, 1970		vs. No. 10 Tennessee; Trojan Classic	W 68–65	7–2	Los Angeles Memorial Sports Arena; Los Angeles, California
Dec 30, 1970		at No. 4 USC; Trojan Classic	L 64–77	7–3	Los Angeles Memorial Sports Arena; Los Angeles, California
Jan 4, 1971		Dayton	W 106–80	8–3	Hofheinz Pavilion; Houston, Texas
Jan 6, 1971		Creighton	W 83–76	9–3	Hofheinz Pavilion; Houston, Texas
Jan 9, 1971		West Texas State	W 90–71	10–3	Hofheinz Pavilion; Houston, Texas
Jan 13, 1971		at Lamar Tech	W 106–88	11–3	McDonald Gym; Beaumont, Texas
Jan 16, 1971		at Centenary (LA)	W 74–68	12–3	Gold Dome; Shreveport, Louisiana
Jan 20, 1971		UNLV	W 130–73	13–3	Hofheinz Pavilion; Houston, Texas
Jan 23, 1971		at Kansas State	W 73–71	14–3	Ahearn Field House; Manhattan, Kansas
Jan 25, 1971		Centenary (LA)	W 80–69	15–3	Hofheinz Pavilion; Houston, Texas
Feb 4, 1971	No. 18	at LIU	W 81–75	16–3	Schwartz Athletic Center; New York City, New York
Feb 6, 1971	No. 18	Seattle	W 93–92	17–3	Hofheinz Pavilion; Houston, Texas
Feb 13, 1971	No. 15	at Loyola (LA)	L 89–92	17–4	Loyola Field House; New Orleans, Louisiana
Feb 20, 1971		at Miami (FL)	W 99–93	18–4	Miami Beach Convention Center; Miami Beach, Florida
Feb 22, 1971		at No. 7 South Carolina	L 71–88	18–5	Carolina Coliseum; Columbia, South Carolina
Feb 25, 1971		Lamar Tech	W 93–74	19–5	Hofheinz Pavilion; Houston, Texas
Feb 27, 1971		No. 6 Jacksonville	W 83–82	20–5	Hofheinz Pavilion; Houston, Texas
Mar 1, 1971	No. 15	at West Texas State	L 77–86	20–6	West Texas State Fieldhouse; Canyon, Texas
NCAA tournament
Mar 13, 1971	No. 18	New Mexico State; Regional quarterfinals – First round	W 72–69	21–6	Hofheinz Pavilion; Houston, Texas
Mar 18, 1971	No. 14	vs. No. 4 Kansas; Regional semifinals – Sweet Sixteen	L 77–78	21–7	Levitt Arena; Wichita, Kansas
Mar 20, 1971	No. 14	vs. No. 12 Notre Dame; Regional third-place game	W 119–106	22–7	Levitt Arena; Wichita, Kansas
*Non-conference game. ^{#}Rankings from AP Poll. (#) Tournament seedings in parentheses. All times are in Central Time.

== Rankings ==
Ranking movements Legend: ██ Increase in ranking ██ Decrease in ranking — = Not ranked
	Week															
Poll	Pre	1	2	3	4	5	6	7	8	9	10	11	12	13	14	Final
AP	17	—	—	—	—	—	—	—	—	18	15	—	—	15	18	14
Coaches	—	—	—	—	—	—	—	—	—	—	17	18	—	14	15	18
