= Jack Kraft =

American basketball player-coach (1921–2014)

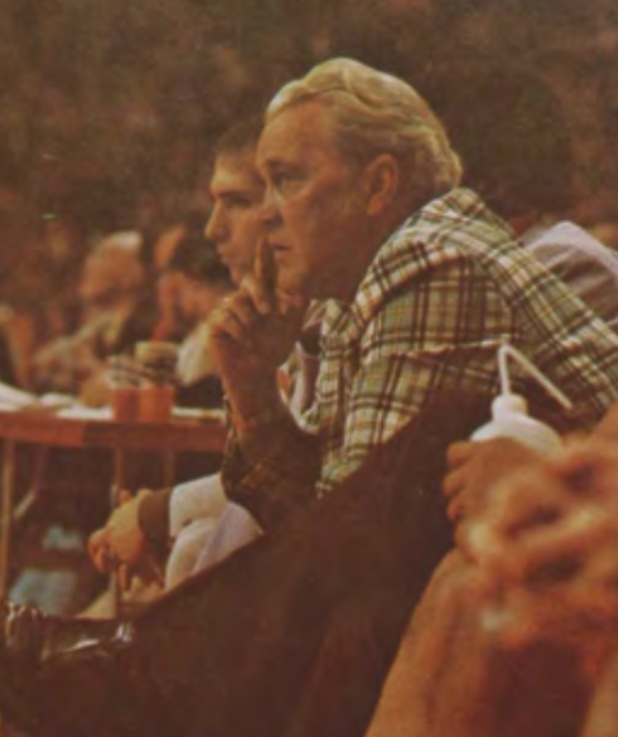
- Kraft from the 1975 Renaissance Yearbook

Biographical details
- Born: February 10, 1921; Philadelphia, Pennsylvania, U.S.
- Died: August 28, 2014 (aged 93); Cape May Court House, New Jersey, U.S.

Playing career
- 1939–1942: Saint Joseph's

Coaching career (HC unless noted)
- 1948–1960: Bishop Neumann HS
- 1960–1961: Malvern Prep
- 1961–1973: Villanova
- 1973–1980: Rhode Island

John Jack Kraft (February 10, 1921 – August 28, 2014) was an American basketball coach who coached Villanova for 12 years, from 1961 through 1973. He compiled a 238–95 record (.715). Kraft led Villanova to the NCAA Tournament six times, and five times to the NIT. Only once did Kraft's teams fail to earn a post-season bid, in his final season of 1973. The 1971 team, led by Howard Porter, reached the NCAA Championship game, and lost to UCLA at the height of the UCLA dynasty. However, that appearance was subsequently erased from the books after Porter was retroactively declared ineligible for signing a professional contract midway through his senior year.

Notable players who played for Jack Kraft at Villanova include Chris Ford, Tom Ingelsby, Wali Jones, Bill Melchionni, Howard Porter, Hank Simeontkowski, Jim Washington, and Hubie White.

Kraft died on August 28, 2014, at the age of 93 in Cape May County, New Jersey. In honor of his memory, the Villanova basketball players wore a JK decal on their uniforms for the 2014–15 season.

== Head coaching record ==
Record table
Season	Team	Overall	Conference	Standing	Postseason
Villanova Wildcats (Independent) (1961–1973)
1961–62	Villanova	21–7			NCAA Elite 8
1962–63	Villanova	19–10			NIT Semifinal/NIT 4th Place
1963–64	Villanova	24–4			NCAA Sweet 16
1964–65	Villanova	23–5			NIT Runner Up
1965–66	Villanova	18–11			NIT Semifinal/NIT 3rd Place
1966–67	Villanova	17–9			NIT 1st Round
1967–68	Villanova	19–9			NIT Quarterfinals
1968–69	Villanova	21–5			NCAA 1st Round
1969–70	Villanova	22–7			NCAA Elite 8
1970–71	Villanova	27–7*			NCAA Runner Up*
1971–72	Villanova	20–8			NCAA 2nd Round
1972–73	Villanova	11–14			
Villanova:		242–96			
Rhode Island Rams (Yankee) (1973–1976)
1973–74	Rhode Island	11–14	6–5	4th	
1974–75	Rhode Island	5–20	3–7	5th	
1975–76	Rhode Island	14–12	7–5	T-2nd	
Rhode Island:		30–46	23–37		
Rhode Island Rams (independent) (1976–1979)
1976–77	Rhode Island	13–13			
1977–78	Rhode Island	24–7			NCAA 1st Round
1978–79	Rhode Island	20–9			NIT 1st Round
Rhode Island:		57–29			
Rhode Island Rams (ECAC North) (1979–1980)
1979–80	Rhode Island	15–13	14–12	T-4th	
1980–81	Rhode Island	1–0			Retire Due To Ill Health
Rhode Island:		16–13	15–12		
Rhode Island:		103–88	38–49		
Total:		345–184			
National champion Postseason invitational champion Conference regular season champion Conference regular season and conference tournament champion Division regular season champion Division regular season and conference tournament champion Conference tournament champion

* NCAA Tournament appearance and standing as tournament runner-up vacated after Howard Porter was ruled ineligible. Official record for 1970–71 is 23–6. & Record at Villanova is 238–95, and overall record is 341–183, without vacated games.

== See also ==
- List of NCAA Division I Men's Final Four appearances by coach
