= 1970–71 Duquesne Dukes men's basketball team =

American college basketball season

1970–71 Duquesne Dukes men's basketball

NCAA tournament, First round
- Conference: Independent

Ranking
- AP: No. 15
- Record: 21–4
- Head coach: Red Manning (13th season)
- Home arena: Civic Arena

1970–71 NCAA University Division men's basketball independents standings
	Conf.				Overall
Team	W		L	PCT	W		L	PCT
No. 2 Marquette		–		–	28	–	1	.966
No. 9 Fordham		–		–	26	–	3	.897
No. 11 Jacksonville		–		–	22	–	4	.846
No. 15 Duquesne		–		–	21	–	4	.840
Hawaii		–		–	23	–	5	.821
No. 19 Villanova		–		–	27	–	7	.794
St. Bonaventure		–		–	21	–	6	.778
No. 14 Houston		–		–	22	–	7	.759
Utah State		–		–	20	–	7	.741
Syracuse		–		–	19	–	7	.731
Georgia Tech		–		–	23	–	9	.719
Providence		–		–	20	–	8	.714
Fairleigh Dickinson		–		–	16	–	7	.696
Rutgers		–		–	16	–	7	.696
Holy Cross		–		–	18	–	8	.692
No. 12 Notre Dame		–		–	20	–	9	.690
Dayton		–		–	18	–	9	.667
St. John's (NY)		–		–	18	–	9	.667
Denver		–		–	17	–	9	.654
Florida State		–		–	17	–	9	.654
Loyola (LA)		–		–	16	–	10	.615
Marshall		–		–	16	–	10	.615
Colgate		–		–	15	–	10	.600
Saint Francis (PA)		–		–	15	–	10	.600
Pittsburgh		–		–	14	–	10	.583
Boston College		–		–	15	–	11	.577
Northern Illinois		–		–	13	–	10	.565
Southern Illinois		–		–	13	–	10	.565
Creighton		–		–	14	–	11	.560
Virginia Tech		–		–	14	–	11	.560
Manhattan		–		–	13	–	11	.542
Cincinnati		–		–	14	–	12	.538
Detroit		–		–	14	–	12	.538
Niagara		–		–	14	–	12	.538
West Virginia		–		–	13	–	12	.520
Centenary		–		–	13	–	13	.500
Pan American		–		–	13	–	13	.500
Navy		–		–	12	–	12	.500
Air Force		–		–	12	–	14	.462
Georgetown		–		–	12	–	14	.462
Seattle		–		–	12	–	14	.462
Army		–		–	11	–	13	.458
Saint Peter's		–		–	11	–	13	.458
Iona		–		–	10	–	12	.455
Penn State		–		–	10	–	12	.455
George Washington		–		–	11	–	14	.440
Seton Hall		–		–	11	–	15	.423
Long Island		–		–	10	–	15	.400
Butler		–		–	10	–	16	.385
Canisius		–		–	8	–	13	.381
Fairfield		–		–	9	–	15	.375
Hardin–Simmons		–		–	9	–	16	.360
Oklahoma City		–		–	9	–	16	.360
Xavier		–		–	9	–	17	.346
DePaul		–		–	8	–	17	.320
St. Francis (NY)		–		–	8	–	17	.320
Tulane		–		–	8	–	18	.308
Boston University		–		–	7	–	18	.280
Miami (FL)		–		–	7	–	19	.269
NYU		–		–	5	–	20	.200
Portland		–		–	5	–	21	.192
Loyola (IL)		–		–	4	–	20	.167
Rankings from AP Poll

The 1970–71 Duquesne Dukes men's basketball team represented Duquesne University in 1970–71 NCAA University Division men's basketball season. The Dukes qualified for the NCAA tournament, where they lost to Penn in the first round.

== Roster ==
1970–71 Duquesne Dukes men's basketball team
Players
Coaches

Pos.	#	Name	Height	Weight	Year	Hometown
G	14	Mike Barr	6 ft 3 in (1.91 m)	165 lb (75 kg)	Jr	Canton, Ohio
F	30	Mickey Davis	6 ft 7 in (2.01 m)	195 lb (88 kg)	Jr	Monaca, Pennsylvania
C	52	Barry Nelson	6 ft 10 in (2.08 m)	236 lb (107 kg)	Sr	Blawnox, Pennsylvania
C	54	Gray Nelson	6 ft 10 in (2.08 m)	240 lb (109 kg)	Sr	Blawnox, Pennsylvania

Head coach

Assistant coach(es)

Legend

- (C) Team captain
- (S) Suspended
- (I) Ineligible
- (W) Walk-on
- Injured
- Current redshirt

== Schedule ==
Date time, TV	Rank^{#}	Opponent^{#}	Result	Record	Site city, state
Regular season
Dec 1, 1970		Roanoke	W 80–73	1–0	Civic Arena; Pittsburgh, Pennsylvania
Dec 3, 1970		Baltimore	W 92–60	2–0	Civic Arena; Pittsburgh, Pennsylvania
Dec 7, 1970		at American	W 81–70	3–0	Fort Myer Ceremony Hall; Washington, D.C.
Dec 12, 1970		at No. 13 Western Kentucky	W 92–60	3–1	E. A. Diddle Arena; Bowling Green, Kentucky
Dec 22, 1970		Steubenville	W 90–50	4–1	Civic Arena; Pittsburgh, Pennsylvania
Dec 29, 1970		Pittsburgh	L 58–70	4–2	Civic Arena; Pittsburgh, Pennsylvania
Dec 30, 1970		William & Mary	W 79–54	5–2	Civic Arena; Pittsburgh, Pennsylvania
Jan 6, 1971		at Xavier	W 84–77	6–2	Schmidt Fieldhouse; Cincinnati, Ohio
Jan 13, 1971		vs. Saint Francis	W 111–71	7–2	
Jan 18, 1971		No. 9 Notre Dame	W 81–78	8–2	Civic Arena; Pittsburgh, Pennsylvania
Jan 21, 1971		Cleveland State	W 106–60	9–2	Civic Arena; Pittsburgh, Pennsylvania
Jan 23, 1971		No. 10 St. Bonaventure	W 89–68	10–2	Civic Arena; Pittsburgh, Pennsylvania
Jan 28, 1971	No. 17	DePaul	W 90–74	11–2	Civic Arena; Pittsburgh, Pennsylvania
Jan 30, 1971	No. 17	at Creighton	W 72–69	12–2	Omaha Civic Auditorium; Omaha, Nebraska
Feb 1, 1971	No. 14	at Santa Clara	W 84–73	13–2	San Jose Civic Auditorium; San Jose, California
Feb 3, 1971	No. 14	at San Francisco	W 90–77	14–2	War Memorial Gymnasium; San Francisco, California
Feb 7, 1971	No. 14	No. 17 Villanova	W 87–78	15–2	Civic Arena; Pittsburgh, Pennsylvania
Feb 10, 1971	No. 12	at Providence	W 85–80	16–2	Alumni Hall; Providence, Rhode Island
Feb 14, 1971	No. 12	Rhode Island	W 116–95	17–2	Civic Arena; Pittsburgh, Pennsylvania
Feb 17, 1971	No. 10	at La Salle	W 95–86	18–2	Palestra; Philadelphia, Pennsylvania
Feb 20, 1971	No. 10	Saint Peter's	W 104–98	19–2	Civic Arena; Pittsburgh, Pennsylvania
Feb 24, 1971	No. 8	at Boston College	L 52–67	19–3	Roberts Center; Chestnut Hill, Massachusetts
Feb 28, 1971	No. 8	Niagara	W 99–69	20–3	Civic Arena; Pittsburgh, Pennsylvania
Mar 2, 1971	No. 11	Detroit	W 93–73	21–3	Civic Arena; Pittsburgh, Pennsylvania
NCAA Tournament
Mar 13, 1971*	No. 11	vs. No. 5 Pennsylvania; East regional quarterfinal	L 65–70	21–4	WVU Coliseum; Morgantown, West Virginia
*Non-conference game. ^{#}Rankings from AP Poll. (#) Tournament seedings in parentheses. E=East. All times are in Eastern Time.
