= 1970–71 USC Trojans men's basketball team =

American college basketball season

1970–71 USC Trojans men's basketball
- Conference: Pacific–8 Conference
- Record: 24–2 (12–2 Pac 8)
- Head coach: Bob Boyd (4th season)
- Home arena: Los Angeles Sports Arena

1970–71 Pacific-8 Conference men's basketball standings
| | Conf. | | | | Overall |
| Team | W | | L | PCT | W | | L | PCT |
|---|---|---|---|---|---|---|---|---|
| No. 1 UCLA | 14 | – | 0 | 1.000 | 29 | – | 1 | .967 |
| No. 5 USC | 12 | – | 2 | .857 | 24 | – | 2 | .923 |
| Oregon | 8 | – | 6 | .571 | 17 | – | 9 | .654 |
| California | 8 | – | 6 | .571 | 16 | – | 9 | .640 |
| Washington | 6 | – | 8 | .429 | 15 | – | 13 | .536 |
| Oregon State | 4 | – | 10 | .286 | 12 | – | 14 | .462 |
| Washington State | 2 | – | 12 | .143 | 12 | – | 14 | .462 |
| Stanford | 2 | – | 12 | .143 | 6 | – | 20 | .231 |
As of 1971; Rankings from AP Poll

The 1970–71 USC Trojans men's basketball team represented the University of Southern California during the 1970–71 college basketball season. The Trojans led by 4th year coach Bob Boyd.

== Roster ==
1970–71 USC Trojans men's basketball team
| Players | Coaches |
|---|---|
| Pos. / # / Name / Height / Weight / Year / Hometown; G / 25 / Paul Westphal / 6 ft 4 in (1.93 m) / 180 lb (82 kg) / Jr / Redondo Beach, California | Head coach: Bob Boyd; Assistant coach(es) Legend: (C) Team captain; (S) Suspended; (I) Ineligible; (W) Walk-on; Injured; Current redshirt |

== Schedule ==
| Date time, TV | Rank^{#} | Opponent^{#} | Result | Record | Site city, state |
|---|---|---|---|---|---|
| December 3* | | at Utah | W 90–81 | 1–0 | Jon M. Huntsman Center; Salt Lake City, Utah |
| December 5* | | at San Francisco | W 83–80 | 2–0 | War Memorial Gymnasium; San Francisco, California |
| December 11* | | BYU | W 101–65 | 3–0 | L.A. Sports Arena; Los Angeles, California |
| December 12* | | Arizona State | W 88–68 | 4–0 | L.A. Sports Arena; Los Angeles, California |
| December 18* | | vs. Florida State | W 94–85 | 5–0 | |
| December 19* | | at UTEP | W 65–63 | 6–0 | Memorial Gym; El Paso, Texas |
| December 21* | | Alabama | W 122–75 | 7–0 | L.A. Sports Arena; Los Angeles, California |
| December 29* | | Michigan State | W 88–63 | 8–0 | L.A. Sports Arena; Los Angeles, California |
| December 30* | | Houston | W 77–64 | 9–0 | L.A. Sports Arena; Los Angeles, California |
| January 2* | | No. 18 LSU | W 80–76 | 10–0 | L.A. Sports Arena; Los Angeles, California |
| January 8 | | Washington State | W 78–68 | 11–0 (1–0) | L.A. Sports Arena; Los Angeles, California |
| January 9 | | Washington | W 79–72 | 12–0 (2–0) | L.A. Sports Arena; Los Angeles, California |
| January 15 | | at California | W 90–66 | 13–0 (3–0) | Harmon Gym; Berkeley, California |
| January 16 | | at Stanford | W 71–51 | 14–0 (4–0) | Maples Pavilion; Stanford, California |
| January 29* | | vs. Illinois | W 81–68 | 15–0 (4–0) | Chicago Stadium; Chicago, Illinois |
| January 30* | | vs. Loyola (IL) | W 97–73 | 16–0 (4–0) | Chicago Stadium; Chicago, Illinois |
| February 6 | | UCLA | L 60–64 | 16–1 (4–1) | L.A. Sports Arena; Los Angeles, California |
| February 12 | | at Oregon State | W 82–63 | 17–1 (5–1) | Gill Coliseum; Corvallis, Oregon |
| February 13 | | at Oregon | W 93–78 | 18–1 (6–1) | McArthur Court; Eugene, Oregon |
| February 19 | | Oregon | W 63–55 | 19–1 (7–1) | L.A. Sports Arena; Los Angeles, California |
| February 20 | | Oregon State | W 110–75 | 20–1 (8–1) | L.A. Sports Arena; Los Angeles, California |
| February 27 | | at Washington | W 81–80 | 21–1 (9–1) | Hec Edmundson Pavilion; Seattle, Washington |
| March 1 | | at Washington State | W 75–64 | 22–1 (10–1) | Bohler Gymnasium; Pullman, Washington |
| March 5 | | Stanford | W 83–74 | 23–1 (11–1) | L.A. Sports Arena; Los Angeles, California |
| March 6 | | California | W 96–81 | 24–1 (12–1) | L.A. Sports Arena; Los Angeles, California |
| March 12 | | at UCLA | L 62–73 | 24–2 (12–2) | Pauley Pavilion; Los Angeles, California |
*Non-conference game. ^{#}Rankings from AP Poll. (#) Tournament seedings in parentheses.
