= 1970–71 Villanova Wildcats men's basketball team =

American college basketball season

1970–71 Villanova Wildcats men's basketball

NCAA tournament, runner-up (vacated)

National Championship Game, L 62-68 vs. UCLA (vacated)
- Conference: Independent

Ranking
- Coaches: No. 17
- AP: No. 19
- Record: 4-0 (27–7 unadjusted)
- Head coach: Jack Kraft (10th season)
- Home arena: Villanova Field House

1970–71 NCAA University Division men's basketball independents standings
	Conf.				Overall
Team	W		L	PCT	W		L	PCT
No. 2 Marquette		–		–	28	–	1	.966
No. 9 Fordham		–		–	26	–	3	.897
No. 11 Jacksonville		–		–	22	–	4	.846
No. 15 Duquesne		–		–	21	–	4	.840
Hawaii		–		–	23	–	5	.821
No. 19 Villanova		–		–	27	–	7	.794
St. Bonaventure		–		–	21	–	6	.778
No. 14 Houston		–		–	22	–	7	.759
Utah State		–		–	20	–	7	.741
Syracuse		–		–	19	–	7	.731
Georgia Tech		–		–	23	–	9	.719
Providence		–		–	20	–	8	.714
Fairleigh Dickinson		–		–	16	–	7	.696
Rutgers		–		–	16	–	7	.696
Holy Cross		–		–	18	–	8	.692
No. 12 Notre Dame		–		–	20	–	9	.690
Dayton		–		–	18	–	9	.667
St. John's (NY)		–		–	18	–	9	.667
Denver		–		–	17	–	9	.654
Florida State		–		–	17	–	9	.654
Loyola (LA)		–		–	16	–	10	.615
Marshall		–		–	16	–	10	.615
Colgate		–		–	15	–	10	.600
Saint Francis (PA)		–		–	15	–	10	.600
Pittsburgh		–		–	14	–	10	.583
Boston College		–		–	15	–	11	.577
Northern Illinois		–		–	13	–	10	.565
Southern Illinois		–		–	13	–	10	.565
Creighton		–		–	14	–	11	.560
Virginia Tech		–		–	14	–	11	.560
Manhattan		–		–	13	–	11	.542
Cincinnati		–		–	14	–	12	.538
Detroit		–		–	14	–	12	.538
Niagara		–		–	14	–	12	.538
West Virginia		–		–	13	–	12	.520
Centenary		–		–	13	–	13	.500
Pan American		–		–	13	–	13	.500
Navy		–		–	12	–	12	.500
Air Force		–		–	12	–	14	.462
Georgetown		–		–	12	–	14	.462
Seattle		–		–	12	–	14	.462
Army		–		–	11	–	13	.458
Saint Peter's		–		–	11	–	13	.458
Iona		–		–	10	–	12	.455
Penn State		–		–	10	–	12	.455
George Washington		–		–	11	–	14	.440
Seton Hall		–		–	11	–	15	.423
Long Island		–		–	10	–	15	.400
Butler		–		–	10	–	16	.385
Canisius		–		–	8	–	13	.381
Fairfield		–		–	9	–	15	.375
Hardin–Simmons		–		–	9	–	16	.360
Oklahoma City		–		–	9	–	16	.360
Xavier		–		–	9	–	17	.346
DePaul		–		–	8	–	17	.320
St. Francis (NY)		–		–	8	–	17	.320
Tulane		–		–	8	–	18	.308
Boston University		–		–	7	–	18	.280
Miami (FL)		–		–	7	–	19	.269
NYU		–		–	5	–	20	.200
Portland		–		–	5	–	21	.192
Loyola (IL)		–		–	4	–	20	.167
Rankings from AP Poll

The 1970–71 Villanova Wildcats men's basketball team represented Villanova University during the 1970–71 NCAA University Division men's basketball season. The team was led by head coach Jack Kraft and played its home games on campus at Villanova Field House in Villanova, Pennsylvania.

The independent Wildcats made a run through the NCAA tournament before falling to No. 1 UCLA, 68–62, in the championship game. Villanova finished with a 27–7 (.794) record. However, the NCAA later vacated 23 of Villanova’s wins in the 1970-71 season due to issues with the eligibility of Howard Porter.

== Roster ==
1970–71 Villanova Wildcats men's basketball team
Players
Coaches

Pos.	#	Name	Height	Weight	Year	Hometown
G	24	Tom Ingelsby	6 ft 3 in (1.91 m)	180 lb (82 kg)	So	Springfield, Pennsylvania
F	32	Hank Siemiontkowski	6 ft 7 in (2.01 m)	—	Jr	Port Richmond, Philadelphia
G	22	Ed Hastings	6 ft 2 in (1.88 m)	—	So	Philadelphia, Pennsylvania
G/F	42	Chris Ford	6 ft 5 in (1.96 m)	185 lb (84 kg)	Jr	Absecon, New Jersey
F	44	Clarence Smith	6 ft 6 in (1.98 m)	—	Sr	Harrisburg, Pennsylvania
G	12	John Fox	6 ft 3 in (1.91 m)	—	Sr	Pitman, New Jersey
G	20	Bob Gohl	6 ft 0 in (1.83 m)	—	Jr	Upper Darby Township, Pennsylvania
G	14	Greg Newman	6 ft 0 in (1.83 m)	—	Jr
C	30	Gary Jentz	6 ft 8 in (2.03 m)	—	So	Long Island, New York
F/C	54	Howard Porter	6 ft 8 in (2.03 m)	215 lb (98 kg)	Sr	Sarasota, Florida
G	34	Mike Daly	6 ft 1 in (1.85 m)	—	Jr	Drexel Hill, Pennsylvania
F	40	Joe McDowell	6 ft 4 in (1.93 m)	—	Jr	Springfield, Massachusetts

Head coach

- Jack Kraft (Saint Joseph's)

Assistant coach(es)

- Dan Dougherty (Saint Joseph's)

Legend

- (C) Team captain
- (S) Suspended
- (I) Ineligible
- (W) Walk-on
- Injured
- Current redshirt

== Schedule and results ==
Date time, TV	Rank^{#}	Opponent^{#}	Result	Record	Site city, state
Regular season
*		Philadelphia Textile	W 91–71	1–0	Villanova Field House; Philadelphia, Pennsylvania
Dec 5, 1970*	No. 8	Princeton	W 81–75	2–0	Palestra; Philadelphia, Pennsylvania
Dec 9, 1970*	No. 10	Detroit Mercy	W 95–67	3–0	Palestra; Philadelphia, Pennsylvania
Dec 11, 1970*	No. 10	Murray State	W 97–63	4–0	Palestra; Philadelphia, Pennsylvania
Dec 14, 1970*	No. 10	Xavier	W 84–62	5–0	Villanova Field House; Philadelphia, Pennsylvania
Dec 18, 1970*	No. 10	vs. Houston	L 84–99	5–1	
Dec 19, 1970*	No. 10	vs. Saint Joseph's	W 85–75	6–1	
Dec 23, 1970*	No. 13	at Stanford	W 96–76	7–1	Maples Pavilion; Stanford, California
Dec 25, 1970*	No. 13	vs. Illinois; Rainbow Classic	W 89–76	8–1	Neal S. Blaisdell Center (7,500); Honolulu, Hawaii
Dec 26, 1970*	No. 13	vs. BYU; Rainbow Classic	L 93–102	8–2	Neal S. Blaisdell Center; Honolulu, Hawaii
Dec 30, 1970*	No. 11	vs. Michigan; Rainbow Classic	L 87–103	8–3	Neal S. Blaisdell Center; Honolulu, Hawaii
*		at North Dakota	W 103–63	9–3	Hyslop Sports Center; Grand Forks, North Dakota
*		at North Dakota State	W 94–61	10–3	Bison Sports Arena; Fargo, North Dakota
Jan 9, 1971*	No. 14	Saint Peter's	W 118–84	11–3	Palestra; Philadelphia, Pennsylvania
Jan 13, 1971*	No. 13	DePaul	W 99–59	12–3	Palestra; Philadelphia, Pennsylvania
Jan 16, 1971*	No. 13	at Niagara	W 82–79	13–3	Gallagher Center; Lewiston, New York
Jan 18, 1971*	No. 14	at No. 10 St. Bonaventure	W 80–67	14–3	University Center; St. Bonaventure, New York
Jan 23, 1971*	No. 14	No. 4 Pennsylvania	L 70–78	14–4	Palestra; Philadelphia, Pennsylvania
Jan 26, 1971*	No. 16	at Seton Hall	W 72–52	15–4	Walsh Gymnasium; South Orange, New Jersey
Feb 2, 1971*	No. 17	St. John's	W 99–82	16–4	Villanova Field House; Philadelphia, Pennsylvania
Feb 7, 1971*	No. 17	at No. 14 Duquesne	L 78–87	16–5	Civic Arena; Pittsburgh, Pennsylvania
Feb 9, 1971*	No. 18	Fairfield	W 97–60	17–5	Villanova Field House; Philadelphia, Pennsylvania
Feb 11, 1971*	No. 18	No. 9 Notre Dame	W 99–81	18–5	Palestra; Philadelphia, Pennsylvania
Feb 13, 1971*	No. 18	No. 13 La Salle	L 69–73	18–6	Palestra; Philadelphia, Pennsylvania
Feb 17, 1971*		Canisius	W 82–59	19–6	Palestra; Philadelphia, Pennsylvania
Feb 20, 1971*		Saint Joseph's	W 63–55	20–6	Palestra; Philadelphia, Pennsylvania
Feb 23, 1971*		Providence	W 76–75	21–6	Villanova Field House; Philadelphia, Pennsylvania
Feb 26, 1971*		Temple	W 67–65	22–6	Palestra; Philadelphia, Pennsylvania
Mar 2, 1971*		at Boston College	W 90–77	23–6	Roberts Center; Chestnut Hill, Massachusetts
NCAA Tournament
Mar 13, 1971*	No. 19	vs. Saint Joseph's; First round	W 93–75	24–6	Palestra; Philadelphia, Pennsylvania
Mar 18, 1971*	No. 19	vs. No. 9 Fordham; East Regional semifinal	W 85–75	25–6	Reynolds Coliseum; Raleigh, North Carolina
Mar 20, 1971*	No. 19	vs. No. 3 Pennsylvania; East Regional final	W 90–47	26–6	Reynolds Coliseum; Raleigh, North Carolina
Mar 25, 1971*	No. 19	vs. No. 7 Western Kentucky; National semifinal	W 92–89 ^{2OT}	27–6	Astrodome; Houston, Texas
Mar 27, 1971*	No. 19	vs. No. 1 UCLA; National Final	L 62–68	27–7	Astrodome (31,765); Houston, Texas
*Non-conference game. ^{#}Rankings from AP Poll. (#) Tournament seedings in parentheses. E=East. All times are in Eastern Time.

== NBA draft ==
Round	Pick	Player	NBA club
2	32	Howard Porter	Chicago Bulls
