= 1971 NCAA University Division basketball tournament =

Edition of USA college basketball tournament

- NCAA logo from 1971 to 1979
- Season: 1970–71
- Teams: 25
- Finals site: Astrodome, Houston, Texas
- Champions: UCLA Bruins (7th title, 7th title game, 8th Final Four)
- Runner-up: Villanova Wildcats (Vacated) (1st title game, 2nd Final Four)
- Semifinalists: Kansas Jayhawks (5th Final Four); Western Kentucky Hilltoppers (Vacated) (1st Final Four)
- Winning coach: John Wooden (7th title)
- MOP: Howard Porter (Villanova, vacated)
- Attendance: 207,200
- Top scorer: Jim McDaniels (Western Kentucky) (147 points)

The 1971 NCAA University Division basketball tournament involved 25 schools playing in single-elimination play to determine the national champion of men's NCAA Division I college basketball. The 33rd annual edition of the tournament began on March 13, 1971, and ended with the championship game on March 27, at the Astrodome in Houston, Texas. A total of 29 games were played, including a third-place game in each region and a national third-place game. This was the last time the Final Four was held in Houston until 2011.

UCLA, coached by John Wooden, won its fifth consecutive national title (its seventh all-time, all in the last eight years) with a 68–62 victory in the final game over Villanova, coached by Jack Kraft. Howard Porter of Villanova was named the tournament's Most Outstanding Player. However, Villanova's placement in the tournament was later vacated because it was found that Porter had signed with an agent prior to the competition. Having lost to undefeated, second-ranked Penn (coached by Dick Harter) twice before, Porter did not think they would make it past the regionals where third-ranked South Carolina was also in their path. However, Penn vanquished South Carolina by 15 points, then had their worst game of the year against Villanova in the East Regional final, losing 90–47. Villanova's first-place finish in the East Regional was relinquished to Penn, with the regional consolation game winner, Fordham (coached by Digger Phelps, a former Penn assistant coach), receiving second place.

== Championship Game ==
UCLA was a heavy favorite over Villanova in the title game. But the Bruins did not cruise through the season in their accustomed fashion. They were severely threatened in their own conference (and backyard) by second-ranked USC, who lost only twice all season – both to UCLA. In addition, UCLA lost at Notre Dame and had several other close calls against Washington, Oregon, and Oregon State. In the West Regional final, the Bruins trailed Long Beach State by 11 points midway through the second half, and their star player Sidney Wicks was on the bench with four personal fouls. But Wicks returned and avoided his fifth foul (and disqualification), and the Bruins rallied to take a 55–53 lead. With 20 seconds remaining, Wicks sank two clinching free throws and UCLA escaped 57–55.

In the national championship game, UCLA jumped out to an early lead, but star players Sidney Wicks and Curtis Rowe struggled against Villanova's stingy zone defense. Only the outside shooting of Henry Bibby and a career best 29 points from center Steve Patterson kept the Bruins in the lead. In the meantime, Villanova stars Howard Porter and Chris Ford overcame early struggles to keep the Wildcats in the game. Midway through the second half, UCLA coach John Wooden ordered the Bruins to go into a four-corner stall offense (there was no shot clock in college basketball at this time), a tactic he rarely employed. Wooden said after the game he did so to bring Villanova out of their zone, and because he wanted to use the stage of the national championship game to show the NCAA that they should adopt a shot clock (something Wooden had long argued for). However, the tactic almost backfired as Villanova started forcing turnovers with an aggressive man-to-man defense. In addition, the stall took UCLA out of its offensive rhythm. Villanova closed the gap to 63–60 and had the ball with one minute to play. However, Porter missed a 15-foot off-balance jumper, Wicks grabbed the rebound, and UCLA made 5 of 6 free throws down the stretch to win 68–62.

In the national third-place game, Western Kentucky defeated Kansas, 77–75.

In a situation similar to Villanova's, Western Kentucky's placement in the tournament was vacated due to an NCAA investigation that showed Jim McDaniels had signed a professional contract and accepted money during the 1970–71 season. Western Kentucky would be found in violation twice more in the next 10 years, earning the school a "lack of institutional control" violation. This made the 1971 Final Four officially the first without a school from east of the Mississippi River. The 2021 Final Four is the first to actually have all four teams come from west of the Mississippi (Baylor, Gonzaga, Houston and UCLA).

The total attendance for the tournament was 220,447, a new record. The crowd of 31,765 for the championship game was also a new record.

== Schedule and venues ==
The following are the sites that were selected to host each round of the 1971 tournament:

First round

- March 13
  - East Region
    - Alumni Hall, Jamaica, New York (Host: St. John's University)
    - WVU Coliseum, Morgantown, West Virginia (Host: West Virginia University)
    - The Palestra, Philadelphia, Pennsylvania (Hosts: University of Pennsylvania, Ivy League)
  - Mideast Region
    - Athletic & Convocation Center, Notre Dame, Indiana (Host: University of Notre Dame)
  - Midwest Region
    - Hofheinz Pavilion, Houston, Texas (Host: University of Houston)
  - West Region
    - USU Assembly Center, Logan, Utah (Host: Utah State University)

Regional semifinals, 3rd-place games, and finals (Sweet Sixteen and Elite Eight)

- March 18 and 20
  - East Regional, Reynolds Coliseum, Raleigh, North Carolina (Host: North Carolina State University)
  - Mideast Regional, Georgia Coliseum, Athens, Georgia (Host: University of Georgia)
  - Midwest Regional, Levitt Arena, Wichita, Kansas (Host: Wichita State University)
  - West Regional, Special Events Center, Salt Lake City, Utah (Host: University of Utah)

National semifinals, 3rd-place game, and championship (Final Four and championship)

- March 25 and 27
  - Astrodome, Houston, Texas (Hosts: Rice University, Southwest Conference)

== Teams ==
Region	Team	Coach	Conference	Finished	Final Opponent	Score
East
East	Duquesne	John Manning	Independent	First round	Penn	L 70–65
East	Fordham	Digger Phelps	Independent	Regional third place	South Carolina	W 100–90
East	Furman	Joe Williams	Southern	First round	Fordham	L 105–74
East	Penn	Dick Harter	Ivy League	Regional Runner-up	Villanova	L 90–47
East	South Carolina	Frank McGuire	Atlantic Coast	Regional Fourth Place	Fordham	L 100–90
East	Saint Joseph's	Jack McKinney	Middle Atlantic	First round	Villanova	L 93–75
East	~~Villanova~~	Jack Kraft	Independent	~~Runner Up~~	UCLA	L 68–62
Mideast
Mideast	Jacksonville	Tom Wasdin	Independent	First round	Western Kentucky	L 74–72
Mideast	Kentucky	Adolph Rupp	Southeastern	Regional Fourth Place	Marquette	L 91–74
Mideast	Marquette	Al McGuire	Independent	Regional third place	Kentucky	W 91–74
Mideast	Miami (OH)	Darrell Hedric	Mid-American	First round	Marquette	L 62–47
Mideast	Ohio State	Fred Taylor	Big Ten	Regional Runner-up	Western Kentucky	L 81–78
Mideast	~~Western Kentucky~~	Johnny Oldham	Ohio Valley	~~Third Place~~	Kansas	W 77–75
Midwest
Midwest	Drake	Maury John	Missouri Valley	Regional Runner-up	Kansas	L 73–71
Midwest	Houston	Guy Lewis	Independent	Regional third place	Notre Dame	W 119–106
Midwest	Kansas	Ted Owens	Big Eight	Fourth Place	Western Kentucky	L 77–75
Midwest	New Mexico State	Lou Henson	Missouri Valley	First round	Houston	L 72–69
Midwest	Notre Dame	Johnny Dee	Independent	Regional Fourth Place	Houston	L 119–106
Midwest	TCU	Johnny Swaim	Southwest	First round	Notre Dame	L 102–94
West
West	BYU	Stan Watts	Western Athletic	Regional Fourth Place	Pacific	L 84–81
West	Long Beach State	Jerry Tarkanian	Pacific Coast	Regional Runner-up	UCLA	L 57–55
West	Pacific	Dick Edwards	West Coast	Regional third place	BYU	W 84–81
West	UCLA	John Wooden	Pacific-8	Champion	Villanova	W 68–62
West	Utah State	LaDell Andersen	Independent	First round	BYU	L 91–82
West	Weber State	Phil Johnson	Big Sky	First round	Long Beach State	L 77–66

== Bracket ==
* – Denotes overtime period

=== East region ===
Quarterfinals
Penn	70
Duquesne	65
Villanova#	93
Saint Joseph's	75
Fordham	105
Furman	74

Semifinals
South Carolina	64
Penn	79
Villanova#	85
Fordham	75

Finals
Penn	47
Villanova#	90
East Regional third place
South Carolina	90
Fordham	100

=== Mideast region ===
Quarterfinals
Western Kentucky#	74
Jacksonville	72
Marquette	62
Miami (OH)	47

Semifinals
Kentucky	83
Western Kentucky#	107
Ohio State	60
Marquette	59

Finals
Western Kentucky#	81
Ohio State	78*
Mideast Regional third place
Kentucky	74
Marquette	91

=== Midwest region ===
Quarterfinals
Houston	72
New Mexico State	69
Notre Dame	102
TCU	94

Semifinals
Kansas	78
Houston	77
Drake	79
Notre Dame	72*

Finals
Kansas	73
Drake	71
Midwest Regional third place
Houston	119
Notre Dame	106

=== West region ===
Quarterfinals
BYU	91
Utah State	82
Long Beach State	77
Weber State	66

Semifinals
UCLA	91
BYU	73
Pacific	65
Long Beach State	78

Finals
UCLA	57
Long Beach State	55
West Regional third place
BYU	81
Pacific	84

=== Final Four ===
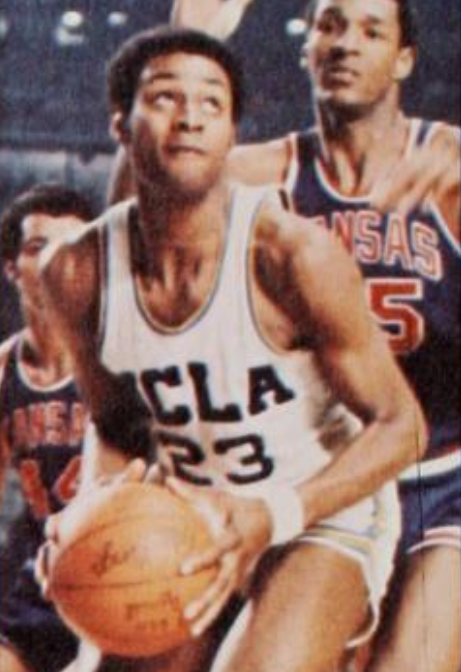
Kenny Booker of UCLA against Kansas in the Final Four.

National semifinals
E	Villanova#	92
ME	Western Kentucky#	89**
MW	Kansas	60
W	UCLA	68

National championship game
E	Villanova#	62
W	UCLA	68
National third-place game
ME	Western Kentucky#	77
MW	Kansas	75

# — The NCAA vacated 23 of Villanova's wins in the 1970–71 season including its appearance in the 1971 NCAA Tournament due to issues with the eligibility of Howard Porter. Western Kentucky also vacated its NCAA Tournament appearance in 1971 due to issues with the eligibility of Jim McDaniels. Unlike forfeiture, a vacated game does not result in the other school being credited with a win, only with the removal of any Villanova and Western Kentucky wins from all records.

== Tournament notes ==
- Jim McDaniels of Western Kentucky had 147 points, top scorer in the playoffs.
- Austin Carr of Notre Dame scored 289 career tournament points in seven games.
- As a result of the Villanova's forfeit to Penn, the 1971 Penn Quakers technically went undefeated but did not win the national championship. North Carolina State went undefeated in 1972–73 but did not win the national championship because they were on NCAA probation and were not eligible to participate in the NCAA tournament.
- Villanova and Western Kentucky became the first two teams to have an officially vacated NCAA Final Four result due to rules violations. This would be repeated by five teams that reached the national championship (as Villanova did), including one winner, among others who lost in the national semifinals (as Western Kentucky did).

== Announcers ==
Curt Gowdy, Tom Hawkins, and Jim Simpson (Final Four only) - First Round at Notre Dame, Indiana (Marquette-Miami Ohio, Western Kentucky-Jacksonville); Mideast Regional Final at Athens, Georgia; Final Four in Houston, Texas

- Jim Simpson and Pat Hernon - East Regional Final at Raleigh, North Carolina

== See also ==
- 1971 NCAA College Division basketball tournament
- 1971 National Invitation Tournament
- 1971 NAIA basketball tournament
- 1971 National Women's Invitation Tournament
