= 1970–71 Kentucky Wildcats men's basketball team =

1970–71 season of University of Kentucky men's basketball team

1970–71 Kentucky Wildcats men's basketball

NCAA Tournament Midwest Regional SEC regular season champions

NCAA Lost Midwest Regional Consolation vs Marquette, L 74–91
- Conference: Southeastern Conference

Ranking
- Coaches: No. 8
- AP: No. 8
- Record: 22–6 (16–2 SEC)
- Head coach: Adolph Rupp (40th season)
- Assistant coaches: Dick Parsons; Jim Hatfield
- Home arena: Memorial Coliseum

1970–71 Southeastern Conference men's basketball standings
	Conf.				Overall
Team	W		L	PCT	W		L	PCT
No. 8 Kentucky	16	–	2	.889	22	–	6	.786
No. 17 Tennessee	13	–	5	.722	21	–	7	.750
LSU	10	–	8	.556	14	–	12	.538
Mississippi State	9	–	9	.500	15	–	10	.600
Vanderbilt	9	–	9	.500	13	–	13	.500
Auburn	8	–	10	.444	11	–	15	.423
Florida	8	–	10	.444	11	–	15	.423
Ole Miss	6	–	12	.333	11	–	15	.423
Alabama	6	–	12	.333	10	–	16	.385
Georgia	5	–	13	.278	6	–	19	.240
Rankings from AP Poll

The 1970–71 Kentucky Wildcats men's basketball team was head coach Adolph Rupp's second to last team. While not as successful as his past Wildcats teams, would go reach the Sweet Sixteen, finishing the season with a 22–6 record (16–2) and a Southeastern Conference regular-season championship.

== Integration on UK basketball team ==
The integration process at the University of Kentucky was a lengthy process to fully complete. Starting with a teenager named Charles Eubanks; he applied to the College of Engineering, but, was denied because of his skin color. Eubanks was denied because of the Kentucky Day Law; which didn't allow black and white students to attend the same school. The lawsuit led to the creation of the "separate but equal" program at the Historically Black College and University of Kentucky State University. The University of Kentucky became integrated in 1949. Lyman T.Johnson was the first African-American to enroll at Kentucky; making the class of 1949 the first integrated class. In 1954, admissions at the university fully opened to undergraduate black students. Adolph Rupp was the head coach of the UK basketball team during the time of segregation within the basketball team. Rupp didn't sign a black player until 1969, even though all of the Universities athletic teams were officially desegregated. Adolph did recruit black players, but they had to be the best of best and carry no flaws. The SEC, which Kentucky played conference basketball in, didn't all black players to play; making it very difficult for black players. Rupp finally signed a black player, Tom Payne, during his second to last season; integrating the University of Kentucky basketball team.

== Adolph Rupp ==
Adolph Rupp's career at Kentucky was legendary and he is considered one of the greatest coaches in college basketball history. Rupp coached 41 seasons at UK and his record included coaching 32 All-Americans, 52 All-SEC players, 44 NBA draft picks, 2 National players of the year, 7 Olympic Gold medalists, and 4 Naismith Memorial basketball hall of fame members, However, Rupp had a lot of controversy during his career including the point-shaving scandal, lack of integration, racism, and a demanding coaching style. The 1951 point-shaving scandal, occurred while Rupp was the head coach; it involved four basketball players who were arrested for taking bribes from gamblers to "shave points" during the National Invitation Tournament game against the Loyola Ramblers. The NCAA voted to ban Kentucky from competing for a year; canceling their 1952–53 season. Adolph Rupp was one of the early innovators of the fast break and set offense and "guard around" plays. His coaching style was composed of repetition, as a result, he was demanding of his players; berating his players and putting maximum pressure on them. Adolph Rupp was forced into retirement when he was 70; he later went on to coach in the ABA and later became a vice-president within the ABA.

== NCAA appearance ==
Through the 1970s, Kentucky had the fifth-best winning percentage throughout all collegiate basketball teams in the nation. The University of Kentucky represented the Mideast division in the NCAA tournament of the 1970–71 season. Their first opponent of that year was facing the independent school of Marquette University whose record that year was 28–1 and was led by head coach, Al McGuire. Their next opponent and last would be Western Kentucky, led by John Oldham in the Sweet Sixteen; the Hilltoppers would make history that year by being the first non-historically black Kentucky college to start all black players. WKU beat UK, subsequently ending their 1970–71 basketball season.

== Breakout players ==
The University of Kentucky basketball team didn't accomplish their end goal of winning a national championship, but they did have two breakout players and an undefeated freshman team. Mike Casey was "Mr. Basketball" in Kentucky and averaged 18 points per game and led the team in free-throw shooting. After the, UK he went on to be drafted by the Chicago Bulls. Larry Steele started all three of his college years and averaged 13 points, 6 rebounds, and 3.9 assists per game. Steele was selected 1st team All-SEC twice, co-caption, MVP, Leadership, and hustle awards. He later went on to be drafted by the Trail Blazers in the NBA and the Kentucky Colonels, but ultimately played for Portland and won an NBA championship in 1977. During Adolph Rupp's time as head coach, he played the freshman on a separate team from the upperclassmen. The University of Kentucky also had an undefeated freshman basketball team that year.
