= 1970–71 NCAA University Division men's basketball rankings =

- Season: 1970–71
- NCAA Tournament: 1971
- Preseason No. 1: UCLA
- NCAA Tournament Champions: UCLA
NCAA University Division men's basketball rankings


The 1970–71 NCAA University Division men's basketball rankings was made up of two human polls, the AP Poll and the Coaches Poll, in addition to various other preseason polls.

== Legend ==
	Increase in ranking
	Decrease in ranking
	New to rankings from previous week
Italics	Number of first place votes
(#–#)	Win–loss record
т	Tied with team above or below also with this symbol

== AP Poll ==
	Preseason	Week 1 Dec. 7	Week 2 Dec. 14	Week 3 Dec. 21	Week 4 Dec. 28	Week 5 Jan. 4	Week 6 Jan. 11	Week 7 Jan. 18	Week 8 Jan. 25	Week 9 Feb. 1	Week 10 Feb. 8	Week 11 Feb. 15	Week 12 Feb. 22	Week 13 Mar. 1	Week 14 Mar. 8	Final Mar. 15	
1.	UCLA	UCLA (2–0)	UCLA (4–0)	UCLA (4–0)	UCLA (6–0)	UCLA (9–0)	UCLA (11–0)	UCLA (13–0)	Marquette (14–0)	Marquette (16–0)	UCLA (16–1)	UCLA (18–1)	UCLA (20–1)	UCLA (21–1)	UCLA (24–1)	UCLA (25–1)	1.
2.	South Carolina	South Carolina (2–0)	South Carolina (3–0)	South Carolina (5–0)	South Carolina (6–0)	South Carolina (9–0)	Marquette (11–0)	Marquette (13–0)	UCLA (14–1)	USC (16–0)	Marquette (18–0)	Marquette (20–0)	Marquette (21–0)	Marquette (23–0)	Marquette (26–0)	Marquette (27–0)	2.
3.	Kentucky	Jacksonville (2–0)	Kentucky (4–0)	Marquette (5–0)	Marquette (6–0)	Marquette (9–0)	USC (12–0)	USC (14–0)	USC (14–0)	UCLA (15–1)	USC (16–1)	USC (18–1)	USC (20–1)	USC (21–1)	USC (24–1)	Penn (27–0)	3.
4.	Jacksonville	Marquette (2–0)	Marquette (4–0)	Jacksonville (5–0)	USC (7–0)	USC (10–0)	Penn (11–0)	Penn (13–0)	Penn (15–0)	Penn (16–0)	Penn (18–0)	Penn (20–0)	Penn (22–0)	Kansas (22–1)	Penn (26–0)	Kansas (25–1)	4.
5.	Notre Dame	Kentucky (2–0)	Jacksonville (5–0)	Penn (5–0)	Western Kentucky (7–0)	Penn (8–0)	Western Kentucky (11–1)	Kansas (11–1)	Kansas (13–1)	Kansas (14–1)	Kansas (16–1)	Kansas (18–1)	Kansas (20–1)	Penn (24–0)	Kansas (23–1)	USC (24–2)	5.
6.	Marquette	Notre Dame (1–1)	Penn (4–0)	USC (6–0)	Penn (6–0)	Western Kentucky (9–1)	South Carolina (10–2)	Jacksonville (10–2)	Jacksonville (12–2)	Jacksonville (14–2)	Jacksonville (16–2)	Jacksonville (18–2)	Jacksonville (21–2)	South Carolina (19–4)	South Carolina (20–4)	South Carolina (23–4)	6.
7.	USC	Drake (2–0)	Notre Dame (3–1)	Kentucky (5–1)	Drake (8–0)	Jacksonville (7–2)	Jacksonville (8–2)	Western Kentucky (12–2)	Notre Dame (9–4)	South Carolina (11–3)	Western Kentucky (15–3)	South Carolina (14–4)	South Carolina (16–4)	Western Kentucky (20–4)	Western Kentucky (20–5)	Western Kentucky (21–5)	7.
8.	Villanova	Penn (2–0)	USC (4–0)	Kansas (6–0)	Kentucky (6–1)	Kansas (9–1)	Kansas (9–1)	Tennessee (11–2)	Tennessee (12–2)	Kentucky (13–3)	Kentucky (15–3)	North Carolina (16–3)	Duquesne (19–2)	Kentucky (20–4)	Kentucky (22–4)	Kentucky (22–4)	8.
9.	Western Kentucky	USC (2–0)	Drake (4–0)	Drake (6–0)	Jacksonville (5–1)	Notre Dame (6–2)	Notre Dame (7–2)	Notre Dame (8–3)	Utah State (15–2)	Western Kentucky (14–3)	Notre Dame (11–5)	Western Kentucky (16–4)	Western Kentucky (18–4)	Jacksonville (21–3)	Jacksonville (22–3)	Fordham (25–2)	9.
10.	Drake	Villanova (2–0)	Villanova (4–0)	Western Kentucky (5–0)	Tennessee (6–0)	St. Bonaventure (8–0)	Kentucky (9–2)	St. Bonaventure (9–1)	South Carolina (10–3)	La Salle (14–1)	South Carolina (13–4)	Duquesne (17–2)	Kentucky (18–4)	Fordham (21–2)	Fordham (23–2)	Ohio State (19–5)	10.
11.	Penn	Indiana (2–0)	Western Kentucky (4–0)	Indiana (5–1)	Villanova (8–1)	Kentucky (7–2)	Indiana (9–2)	South Carolina (10–3)	Kentucky (11–3)	Tennessee (13–3)	North Carolina (13–3)	La Salle (17–2)	Fordham (20–1)	Duquesne (19–3)	Duquesne (21–3)	Jacksonville (22–4)	11.
12.	Utah State	Kansas (2–0)	Kansas (4–0)	Tennessee (5–0)	Kansas (7–1)	Indiana (8–2)	St. Bonaventure (9–1)	Kentucky (10–3)	Western Kentucky (12–3)	Notre Dame (10–5)	Duquesne (15–2)	Kentucky (16–4)	Michigan (14–4)	North Carolina (19–4)	Ohio State (18–5)	Notre Dame (20–7)	12.
13.	Duke	Western Kentucky (2–0)	Indiana (3–1)	Villanova (6–1)	St. Bonaventure (6–0)	Louisville (8–1)	Villanova (11–3)	Utah State (12–2)	Oregon (10–2)	Utah State (15–3)	La Salle (15–2)	Tennessee (16–4)	North Carolina (17–4)	Ohio State (16–5)	North Carolina (20–5)	North Carolina (22–6)	13.
14.	Kansas	Army (2–0)	Tennessee (3–0)	Notre Dame (3–2)	Indiana (6–2)	Villanova (8–2)	Fordham (12–0)	Villanova (13–3)	La Salle (12–1)	Duquesne (12–2)	Tennessee (14–4)	Notre Dame (13–6)	La Salle (18–3)	Tennessee (19–5)	Notre Dame (19–7)	Houston (21–6)	14.
15.	New Mexico State	New Mexico State (2–0)	Utah State (5–1)	St. Bonaventure (5–0)	Notre Dame (3–2)	Utah State (9–2)	North Carolina (10–2)	La Salle (10–1)	Virginia (11–2)	Illinois (9–3)	Houston (17–3)	Utah State (19–4)	Louisville (17–4)	Houston (20–5)	Tennessee (20–6)	Duquesne (21–4)	15.
16.	Indiana	Utah State (2–1)	Oregon (4–1)	Purdue (5–2)	Oregon (6–1)	Drake (8–2)	Louisville (10–2)	Oregon (9–2)	Villanova (14–4)	North Carolina (12–3)	Michigan (12–4)	Michigan (13–4)	Utah State (19–5)	Notre Dame (17–7)	Utah State (20–6)	Long Beach State (23–4)	16.
17.	Houston	Tennessee (2–0)	New Mexico State (6–0) т	Oregon (5–1) т	Louisville (5–1)	Tennessee (7–2)	Utah State (10–2)	Fordham (12–1)	Duquesne (10–2)	Villanova (15–4)	Murray State (15–2)	Murray State (17–2)	Tennessee (17–5)	Long Beach State (21–4)	Long Beach State (22–4)	Tennessee (20–6)	17.
18.	Long Beach State	Oregon (3–0)	Florida State (5–1) т	North Carolina (5–1) т	LSU (5–0)	Fordham (11–0)	Tennessee (9–2)	Indiana (9–3)	Illinois (8–2)	Houston (15–3)	Villanova (16–4)	Fordham (18–1)	Ohio State (14–5)	Indiana (16–4)	Houston (20–6)	Drake (20–7)	18.
19.	NC State	St. Bonaventure (2–0)	St. Bonaventure (3–0)	St. John's (6–0)	Utah State (5–2)	North Carolina (8–2) т	Memphis State (11–2)	Virginia (11–2)	Murray State (13–2)	Murray State (14–2)	Utah State (17–4)	Louisville (16–4)	Notre Dame (15–7)	La Salle (19–4)	Duke (18–7)	Villanova (24–6)	19.
20.	St. Bonaventure	Louisville (2–0)	North Carolina (3–0)	New Mexico State (6–1)	Purdue (5–3)	Purdue (6–5) т	Oregon State (9–2)	North Carolina (11–3)	North Carolina (11–3)	Michigan (10–4)	Fordham (16–1)	Ohio State (12–5)	Long Beach State (20–4)	Utah State (20–6)	Miami (OH) (20–4)	BYU (19–9)	20.
	Preseason	Week 1 Dec. 7	Week 2 Dec. 14	Week 3 Dec. 21	Week 4 Dec. 28	Week 5 Jan. 4	Week 6 Jan. 11	Week 7 Jan. 18	Week 8 Jan. 25	Week 9 Feb. 1	Week 10 Feb. 8	Week 11 Feb. 15	Week 12 Feb. 22	Week 13 Mar. 1	Week 14 Mar. 8	Final Mar. 15	
		Dropped: Duke; Houston; Long Beach State; NC State	Dropped: Army; Louisville	Dropped: Utah State; Florida State	Dropped: North Carolina; St. John's; New Mexico State	Dropped: Oregon; LSU	Dropped: Drake; Purdue	Dropped: Louisville; Memphis State; Oregon State	Dropped: St. Bonaventure; Fordham; Indiana	Dropped: Oregon; Virginia	Dropped: Illinois (10–4)	Dropped: Houston; Villanova	Dropped: Murray State	Dropped: Michigan; Louisville (17–6)	Dropped: Indiana; La Salle (20–6)	Dropped: Utah State; Duke; Miami (OH)	

== Coaches Poll ==
	Preseason	Week 1 Dec. 7	Week 2 Dec. 14	Week 3 Dec. 21	Week 4 Dec. 28	Week 5 Jan. 4	Week 6 Jan. 11	Week 7 Jan. 18	Week 8 Jan. 25	Week 9 Feb. 1	Week 10 Feb. 8	Week 11 Feb. 15	Week 12 Feb. 22	Week 13 Mar. 1	Week 14 Mar. 8	Final Mar. 15	
1.	UCLA	UCLA (2–0)	UCLA (4–0)	UCLA (4–0)	UCLA (6–0)	UCLA (9–0)	UCLA (11–0)	UCLA (13–0)	USC (14–0)	USC (16–0)	UCLA (16–1)	UCLA (18–1)	UCLA (20–1)	UCLA (21–1)	UCLA (24–1)	UCLA (25–1)	1.
2.	South Carolina	South Carolina (2–0)	South Carolina (3–0)	South Carolina (5–0)	South Carolina (6–0)	South Carolina (9–0)	USC (12–0)	USC (14–0)	UCLA (14–1)	UCLA (15–1)	Marquette (18–0)	Marquette (20–0)	Marquette (21–0)	Marquette (23–0)	Marquette (26–0)	Marquette (27–0)	2.
3.	Jacksonville	Kentucky (2–0)	Jacksonville (5–0)	Jacksonville (5–0)	Marquette (6–0)	USC (10–0)	Marquette (11–0)	Marquette (13–0)	Marquette (14–0)	Marquette (16–0)	USC (16–1)	USC (18–1)	USC (20–1)	USC (21–1)	USC (24–1)	Penn (27–0)	3.
4.	Kentucky	Jacksonville (2–0)	Kentucky (4–0)	Marquette (5–0)	USC (7–0)	Marquette (9–0)	Penn (11–0)	Penn (13–0)	Penn (15–0)	Penn (16–0)	Penn (18–0)	Penn (20–0)	Penn (22–0)	Penn (24–0)	Penn (26–0)	Kansas (25–1)	4.
5.	Marquette	Marquette (2–0)	Marquette (4–0)	USC (6–0)	Western Kentucky (7–0)	Penn (8–0)	Western Kentucky (11–1)	Kansas (11–1)	Kansas (13–1)	Kansas (14–1)	Kansas (16–1)	Kansas (18–1)	Kansas (20–1)	Kansas (22–1)	Kansas (23–1)	USC (24–2)	5.
6.	Notre Dame	Notre Dame (1–1)	USC (4–0)	Penn (5–0)	Penn (6–0)	Western Kentucky (9–1)	South Carolina (10–2)	Jacksonville (10–2)	Jacksonville (12–2)	Jacksonville (14–2)	Jacksonville (16–2)	Jacksonville (18–2)	Jacksonville (21–2)	South Carolina (19–4)	Jacksonville (22–3)	South Carolina (23–4)	6.
7.	Penn	USC (2–0)	Penn (4–0)	Kentucky (5–1)	Kentucky (6–1)	Kansas (9–1)	Jacksonville (8–2)	Western Kentucky (12–2)	Notre Dame (9–4)	South Carolina (11–3)	Western Kentucky (15–3)	Western Kentucky (16–4)	South Carolina (16–4)	Western Kentucky (20–4)	South Carolina (20–4)	Western Kentucky (21–5)	7.
8.	Western Kentucky	Western Kentucky (2–0)	Kansas (4–0)	Kansas (6–0)	Jacksonville (5–1)	Kentucky (7–2)	Kansas (9–1)	South Carolina (10–3)	Tennessee (12–2)	Western Kentucky (14–3)	Kentucky (15–3)	Michigan (13–4)	Western Kentucky (18–4)	Jacksonville (21–3)	Western Kentucky (20–5)	Kentucky (22–4)	8.
9.	Utah State	Kansas (2–0)	Notre Dame (3–1)	St. John's (6–0)	Drake (8–0)	Jacksonville (7–2)	Kentucky (9–2)	Tennessee (11–2)	South Carolina (10–3)	Tennessee (13–3)	South Carolina (13–4)	South Carolina (14–4)	Fordham (20–1)	Fordham (21–2)	Kentucky (22–4)	Fordham (25–2)	9.
10.	USC	Penn (2–0)	Villanova (4–0)	Drake (6–0)	Villanova (8–1)	Notre Dame (6–2)	Notre Dame (7–2)	Villanova (13–3)	Western Kentucky (12–3)	Kentucky (13–3)	Notre Dame (11–5)	North Carolina (16–3)	Michigan (14–4)	Kentucky (20–4)	Fordham (23–2)	Ohio State (19–5)	10.
11.	Kansas	Indiana (2–0)	Western Kentucky (4–0)	Western Kentucky (5–0)	Kansas (7–1)	St. Bonaventure (8–0)	Fordham (12–0)	Utah State (12–2)	Utah State (15–2)	Illinois (9–3)	North Carolina (13–3)	La Salle (17–2)	Duquesne (19–2)	North Carolina (19–4)	Ohio State (18–5)	Jacksonville (22–4) т	11.
12.	Indiana	Villanova (2–0)	Drake (4–0)	Indiana (5–1)	Tennessee (6–0)	Villanova (8–2)	St. Bonaventure (9–1)	St. Bonaventure (9–1)	Oregon (10–2)	La Salle (14–1)	Michigan (12–4)	Duquesne (17–2)	Kentucky (18–4)	Duquesne (19–3)	Duquesne (21–3)	BYU (19–9) т	12.
13.	Villanova	Utah State (2–1)	Utah State (5–1)	Villanova (6–1)	St. John's (7–1)	Indiana (8–2)	Villanova (11–3)	Notre Dame (8–3)	Kentucky (11–3)	Notre Dame (10–5)	Duquesne (15–2)	Fordham (18–1)	North Carolina (17–4) т	Ohio State (16–5)	BYU (18–9)	North Carolina (22–6)	13.
14.	Florida State	Drake (2–0)	North Carolina (3–0)	Notre Dame (3–2)	Louisville (5–1)	Louisville (8–1) т	Indiana (9–2)	La Salle (10–1)	La Salle (12–1)	Fordham (13–1)	Fordham (16–1)	Kentucky (16–4)	La Salle (18–3) т	Houston (20–5)	North Carolina (20–5)	Notre Dame (20–7) т	14.
15.	Long Beach State	Louisville (2–0)	Indiana (3–1)	Oregon (5–1)	Colorado State (7–1) т	Oregon (7–2) т	North Carolina (10–2)	Oregon (9–2)	Fordham (12–1)	North Carolina (12–3)	La Salle (15–2) т	Tennessee (16–4)	Louisville (17–4) т	Louisville (17–6)	Houston (20–6) т	Long Beach State (23–4) т	15.
16.	Drake т	Florida State (3–0)	New Mexico State (6–0)	North Carolina (5–1)	New Mexico (9–1) т	Fordham (11–0)	Oregon (9–2)	Fordham (12–1)	Illinois (8–2)	Utah State (15–3)	Tennessee (14–4) т	Utah State (19–4)	Tennessee (17–5)	La Salle (19–4)	Drake (19–7) т	Drake (20–7)	16.
17.	Utah т	Long Beach State (1–1)	Colorado State (5–0)	Tennessee (5–0) т	Oregon (6–1)	Utah State (9–2)	Weber State (9–1)	Kentucky (10–3) т	Villanova (14–4)	Michigan (10–4)	Houston (17–3) т	Louisville (16–4)	Villanova (20–6)	Utah State (20–6)	Hawaii (22–4) т	Villanova (24–6)	17.
18.	Kansas State	Tennessee (2–0)	Florida State (5–1)	Utah State (5–2) т	Indiana (6–2) т	North Carolina (8–2)	Utah State (10–2)	Weber State (10–1) т	Duquesne (10–2) т	Duquesne (12–2)	Illinois (10–4) т	Houston (17–4) т	Utah State (19–5) т	Hawaii (22–4) т	Notre Dame (19–7) т	Houston (21–6) т	18.
19.	Duke	New Mexico (2–0)	Long Beach State (4–1)	Colorado State (6–1) т	LSU (5–0) т	Drake (8–2) т	Louisville (10–2) т	Illinois (8–2)	North Carolina (11–3) т	Villanova (15–4) т	Oregon (12–4) т	Villanova (18–6) т	Arizona State (15–7) т	Villanova (22–6) т	Utah State (20–6) т	Duquesne (21–4) т	19.
20.	Illinois	North Carolina (2–0)	St. John's (3–0)	New Mexico (8–1) т	Utah State (5–2) т	New Mexico (9–2) т	New Mexico (10–3) т	North Carolina (11–3)	Memphis State (12–3) т	Nebraska (12–3) т	Louisville (15–4)	Notre Dame (13–6)	Hawaii (21–3) т	Weber State (20–5) т	La Salle (20–6) т Louisville (19–7) т Weber State (21–5) т	Weber State (21–6)	20.
	Preseason	Week 1 Dec. 7	Week 2 Dec. 14	Week 3 Dec. 21	Week 4 Dec. 28	Week 5 Jan. 4	Week 6 Jan. 11	Week 7 Jan. 18	Week 8 Jan. 25	Week 9 Feb. 1	Week 10 Feb. 8	Week 11 Feb. 15	Week 12 Feb. 22	Week 13 Mar. 1	Week 14 Mar. 8	Final Mar. 15	
		Dropped: Utah; Kansas State; Duke; Illinois	Dropped: Louisville; Tennessee; New Mexico	Dropped: New Mexico State (6–1); Florida State; Long Beach State	Dropped: Notre Dame; North Carolina	Dropped: Tennessee; St. John's; Colorado State; LSU	Dropped: Drake	Dropped: Indiana (9–3); Louisville; New Mexico	Dropped: St. Bonaventure; Weber State	Dropped: Oregon; Memphis State	Dropped: Utah State (17–4); Villanova (16–4); Nebraska	Dropped: Illinois; Oregon	Dropped: Houston; Notre Dame (15–7)	Dropped: Michigan; Tennessee; Arizona State	Dropped: Villanova	Dropped: Hawaii; Utah State; La Salle; Louisville	
