= Drake Bulldogs men's basketball =

Drake University's men's basketball team

2026–27 Drake Bulldogs men's basketball team
- University: Drake University
- First season: 1906
- Athletic director: Brian Hardin
- Head coach: Eric Henderson (2nd season)
- Location: Des Moines, Iowa
- Arena: Knapp Center (capacity: 6,424)
- Conference: Missouri Valley
- Nickname: Bulldogs
- Colors: Blue and white
- Student section: The Dog Pound
- All-time record: 1,400–1,529 (.478)

NCAA Division I tournament Final Four
- 1969
Other NCAA Division I tournament results
Elite Eight	1969, 1970, 1971
Sweet Sixteen	1969, 1970, 1971
Appearances	1969, 1970, 1971, 2008, 2021, 2023, 2024, 2025

Conference tournament champions
- 2008, 2023, 2024, 2025

Conference regular-season champions
- 1935, 1936, 1939, 1964, 1969, 1970, 1971, 2008, 2019, 2025

Uniforms
Home	Away

The Drake Bulldogs men's basketball team represents Drake University, located in Des Moines, Iowa, in NCAA Division I basketball competition. The program is best known for making the 1969 Final Four. The Bulldogs have appeared eight times in the NCAA tournament, making their most recent appearance in 2025.

== History ==
=== The early years (1906–1959) ===
The first season Drake fielded a men's basketball team was 1906–07. The Bulldogs finished with a 2–1 record as an independent. The next year, during the 1907–08 season, they were charter members of the Missouri Valley Conference.

Drake went on to dominate the 1930s, winning three conference titles in the decade (1934–35, 1935–36, and 1938–39). The Bulldogs did not qualify for a postseason tournament by winning the conference title, though, as no post-season tournaments were held during the 1934–35 season. The following 1935–36 season Drake was invited to the District Olympic Tournament post-season tournament (defeating North Dakota 49–46, falling to Minnesota 36–19). The Bulldogs participated in the National Intercollegiate Tournament in 1937–38 (losing to Murray State 47–40) and 1938–39 (losing to Oklahoma State 28–15).

Throughout the 1940s and 1950s Drake's winning streak secured eight winning seasons. There was no Missouri Valley Conference play during the 1943–44 and 1944–45 seasons because of World War II. This was in part because most MVC schools did not play basketball during those seasons. In 1951 Drake withdrew from the MVC, along with Bradley, in protest of the MVC's failure to discipline Oklahoma A&M in the Johnny Bright Incident. Drake would not compete in the Missouri Valley Conference again until the 1956–57 season.

=== 1960–1986 ===
During the 1960s through mid-1980s, the Bulldogs were in the national rankings on a regular basis and the MVC was one of the premier conferences in men's basketball. Drake had fourteen winning seasons during this time.

=== Maury John era ===
Coach Maury John had a Drake record 211 wins (211-131) coaching the Bulldogs from 1958 to 1971. John came to Drake after he had compiled a 285–58 record (.831) at Moberly Junior College (1946–1958) and led Moberly to back-to-back NJCAA National Championships in 1954 and 1955. (John was replaced by Cotton Fitzsimmons at Moberly when he came to Drake.) After Coach John, Howard Stacey compiled a 34–44 record coaching Drake from 1971 to 1974, Bob Ortegel compiled a 94–103 record from 1974 to 1981 and Gary Garner was 95-104 from 1981 to 1988.

Under Coach John, Drake shared the 1963–64 Missouri Valley Conference title with Louisville and received an invitation to the 1964 National Invitation Tournament (NIT). In the NIT, Drake defeated Pittsburgh 87–82 in the first round and lost to tournament runner-up New Mexico 65–60 in the second round.

The 1968–69 Drake Bulldog season was by far the most accomplished in program history, as the Bulldogs advanced to the 1969 NCAA Final Four. The Bulldogs, under Coach John, won the Missouri Valley Conference outright and advanced to the 1969 NCAA Tournament Final Four, finishing third. During the tournament, Drake received a bye in the first round, defeated Texas A&M 81–63 in the Sweet Sixteen and Colorado State in the Elite Eight 84–77. The Bulldogs would fall to eventual champion UCLA with Coach John Wooden 85–82 in the national semifinal before routing North Carolina under Coach Dean Smith 104–84 in the third-place game.

In the 1969 NCAA Final Four, on March 20, 1969, in the National Semi-Final, Drake lost to UCLA with Kareem Abdul-Jabbar and Coach John Wooden 85–82. Drake, with 24 points from Willie McCarter, 13 points with 16 rebounds from Willie Wise, and defense from Rick Wanamaker and Dolph Pulliam, almost pulled off a historic upset. UCLA led 83–74 with one minute and 12 seconds remaining before Drake scored eight straight points to make the score 83–82 with just seconds remaining. (UCLA would go on to defeat Purdue (92–72) in the NCAA Championship game, their fourth of seven consecutive NCAA Championships.

The Los Angeles Times described the closing moments of the UCLA game: "Late in the game, UCLA led by three, but Drake had the ball and the momentum. Guard Willie McCarter put up a jumper from the left corner that ricocheted around the rim before falling into the hands of Drake forward Dolph Pulliam, who went straight back up with it. On the way up, Pulliam was hammered by Alcindor and Curtis Rowe, but the ball somehow made it through the hoop. The basket counted, but no foul was called against the Bruins. Eight seconds remained, and Drake trailed by one. UCLA escaped the Bulldogs' full-court press and got a pass through to Lynn Shackelford. In desperation, Drake's Ron Gwin fouled him. Shackelford made both of his one-and-one attempts."

After the game, Coach John Wooden was asked what had been wrong with UCLA. Wooden replied simply,"Drake."

In the 1969 NCAA 3rd-place game, the Bulldogs defeated Coach Dean Smith's ACC Champion North Carolina Tar Heels, with Charlie Scott convincingly, 104–84, behind 28 points from Willie McCarter. Drake finished the season 26–5.

Drake continued their success under Coach John in the next two seasons as they advanced to the Elite Eight of both the 1970 NCAA tournament and the 1971 NCAA tournament. Drake finished 22–7 in 1969–1970 and 21–8 in 1970–1971.

In the 1969–70 season once again captured the Missouri Valley Conference title and made their second straight NCAA tournament. Earning a bye in the first round, Drake defeated Houston, with Coach Guy Lewis and Dwight Davis, 92–87. Drake lost to New Mexico State 87–78 in the 1971 Midwest Regional Final.

In 1970–71, the Bulldogs earned their third straight Missouri Valley Conference championship. They made their third straight NCAA trip, qualifying for the 1971 NCAA tournament. There, Drake (21–8) defeated Notre Dame University with Austin Carr 79–72 in OT, then lost to Kansas 73–71 in the Midwest Regional Final.

In 1971, after 13 seasons and a Drake record 211 wins, Coach John left Drake for Iowa State University in Ames, Iowa. John's tenure at ISU was short, as he died of cancer on October 15, 1974 at the age of 55.

=== Bob Ortegel era ===
Drake won their first national tournament title during the 1974–75 season, capturing the National Commissioners Invitational Tournament postseason title under Coach Ortegel. In the tournament, the Bulldogs defeated USC 80–70, Bowling Green 78–65, and Arizona in the championship game 83–76.

The Bulldogs also advanced to the National Invitational Tournament during the 1980–81 season, under Coach Ortegel, losing to Minnesota in the first round 90–77 and the 1985–86 season under Coach Gary Garner, falling to Marquette 79–59 in the first round.

=== 1987–2006 ===
From 1987 to 2006, Drake did not have a winning season in men's basketball; the stretch included a 2–26 season in 1996–97 and a 3–24 season in 1997–98. The Bulldogs went through four coaches, none of whom finished with a winning coaching record at Drake.

In the 2001–02 season Drake suspended four players at winter semester break due to their not abiding by the school's 2.0 GPA rule (NCAA requires 1.8), but despite having a depleted roster, the Bulldogs nearly eked out a winning season. Drake entered the MVC tournament with a 14–14 record; but fell to Illinois State 63–64 on a buzzer beating shot, ending the season 14–15.

The next season (2002–03) Drake would finish 10–20, leading to the dismissal of head coach Kurt Kanaskie at season's end.

=== Tom Davis era ===
On April 22, 2003, Drake announced the hiring of former Iowa head coach Dr. Tom Davis as its new men's basketball coach. The hiring drew national attention and brought instant credibility to the struggling program. Davis’ career included sixteen 20-win seasons, 18 post season appearances, and he was named Associated Press National Coach of the Year in 1987.

During the 2003–04 season, Davis began a massive rebuilding project of Bulldog basketball. After going 37–51 in his first three seasons, the team finished 17–15 in the 2006–2007 season for its first winning record in 21 years. Following the season, Davis resigned and was succeeded by his son Keno Davis.

=== 2007–2008 season ===
Under the guidance of Keno Davis, the 2007–08 season was one of the most storied in Drake history. The Bulldogs won the Missouri Valley Conference regular season and tournament titles, advancing the NCAA tournament. Drake earned a five seed in the NCAA tournament and they were ranked nationally throughout the year. While playing Western Kentucky, though, Ty Rodgers hit a last-second 26-foot three-point shot, giving Western Kentucky a 101–99 overtime victory in the first round. Drake finished the season with a school best 28–5 record.

=== 2008–2017 ===
After the successful 2007–08 season, Keno Davis accepted the head basketball coach position at Providence. As a result, Drake AD Sandy Hatfield Clubb hired former Arizona State assistant coach Mark Phelps. In 2008–09, Phelps' first season, the Bulldogs finished with a 17–16 record, falling in the College Insider Tournament to Idaho. Despite his ability to recruit, Phelps' on the court coaching led to finishes of 7th and below in the MVC and dwindling fan attendance and support. Phelps's contract was not renewed following the 2012–13 season, and Drake AD Sandy Hatfield Clubb replaced him with her new choice Ray Giacoletti. After failing to finish above .500 for three seasons and a 1–8 start in his fourth year, Giacoletti turned in his resignation to Drake AD Sandy Hatfield Clubb on December 6, 2016, and Interim Head Coach Jeff Rutter took over in his place, leading the team to their ninth play-in game in nine seasons under a coach chosen by Drake AD Sandy Hatfield Clubb.

On March 26, 2017, Drake University President "Marty" Martin named former Furman University head coach Niko Medved as head men's basketball coach. After a 17–17 season that exceeded low expectations, Medved announced his departure from Drake, accepting an offer from Colorado State University on March 22, 2018, less than one year after his tenure at Drake began.

=== Darian DeVries era ===
On March 29, 2018, Creighton University assistant coach Darian DeVries was named the new head coach of the team. Devries led the Bulldogs to a regular season record of 23–8 and won the MVC Championship in his first year as head coach. Devries was named MVC Coach of the Year for his role in returning Drake to the top of The Valley.

In 2020, Drake hosted Northern Iowa in a nationally televised game which was also the first Knapp Center sell out since the 2007-08 season. Drake lost in humiliating fashion to their instate conference rival scoring a season low 43 points in route to a 70-43 loss. Six days later at Arch Madness Drake scored a revenge upset against Northern Iowa, becoming the first team in tournament history to upset a 1-seed in the quarterfinal round 77-56. Drake would lose in the semifinal round to eventual tournament champion Bradley. Although the NCAA tournament was canceled due to the COVID-19 pandemic before brackets could be announced, the loss sent their instate rivals to the tournament bubble and many bracketologists expected the loss to cost Northern Iowa their chance at an at-large NCAA Tournament bid. Drake's upset also became the first time in school history a coach had led their team to back-to-back 20 win seasons in their first two seasons at the school.

For the 2020-21 season, Drake had an undefeated non-conference season and started the season with an 18-0 record, the best start in school history. The Bulldogs finished regular season with 24 wins to mark their third-straight 20-win season, a feat which had only previously happened once. The Bulldogs also equaled a school record with 15 Missouri Valley Conference wins.

The 2020-21 team made the program's first NCAA Tournament appearance in 13 years. Their First Four appearance against former MVC foe Wichita State on March 18 resulted in a 53-52 victory, which was the team's first win in the tournament in 50 years. The Bulldogs bowed out in the next round against the USC Trojans two days later, ending their season at 26-5.

In the 2022-23 season the team won the Missouri Valley Conference Tournament and returned to the NCAA Tournament as the number 12 seed in the Midwest Region, losing in the first round to #5 seed Miami 56-63. The Bulldogs finished the season 27 and 8. The Drake Bulldogs gymnasium was featured in the final scene of the 2023 Peacock streaming movie Champions starring Woody Harrelson, Matt Cook & Caitlin Olson.

The 2023-24 season was Drake's sixth straight season, all under Devries, with 20 or more wins and saw Drake go undefeated at home throughout the entire season. Drake received an automatic bid to the NCAA Tournament and was selected as the No. 10 seed in the East Region, but lost to the #7 seed Washington State in the first round 61 to 66. After three NCAA appearances in four seasons, Devries left just three days after the conclusion of the season to become the head coach at West Virginia.

=== 2024–25 season ===
The 2024-25 season marked a new era for the Drake Bulldogs men's basketball program. Following the departure of head coach Darian DeVries to West Virginia after the 2023–24 season, Drake hired Ben McCollum as the program’s new head coach in April 2024. McCollum, who previously led Division II powerhouse Northwest Missouri State to four national championships, was tasked with continuing the program’s recent success at the Division I level.

In his first and only season at Drake, McCollum guided the Bulldogs to a 27–3 overall record and a 17–3 record in MVC play. The team captured its first outright MVC regular season championship since the 2007-08 season. Drake carried its momentum into the MVC Tournament, earning victories over Southern Illinois, Belmont, and Bradley to secure its third consecutive tournament title.

Drake received an automatic bid to the NCAA Tournament and was selected as the No. 11 seed in the West Region. In the first round, the Bulldogs defeated No. 6 seed Missouri 67–57, earning their first Round of 64 NCAA Tournament win since 1971. Their season came to an end in the second round after a hard-fought loss to Texas Tech.

Junior guard Bennett Stirtz played a key role throughout the season, leading the team in scoring and assists. He was named the Missouri Valley Conference Tournament Most Valuable Player following his performance during the Bulldogs' championship run.

Hours after their defeat in the Round of 32, McCollum accepted the head coaching position at the University of Iowa. Later that week, Drake announced the hiring of Eric Henderson, the former head coach of South Dakota State, to lead the program moving forward.

== Drake Bulldog head coaches ==
List of Drake Bulldogs men's basketball head coaches

== Record versus conference teams ==
Below are the records of the Bulldogs versus current members of the Missouri Valley Conference as of the 2025–26 season.

Team	Record
Belmont	6–2
Bradley	75–96
Evansville	38–28
Illinois State	42–63
Indiana State	55–49
Murray State	7–4
Northern Iowa	36–54
Southern Illinois	49–62
UIC	11–6
Valparaiso	14–10

== MVC All-Centennial Team ==
In 2006–07, the Missouri Valley Conference celebrated its centennial as the nation's second-oldest NCAA Division I conference. As part of the celebration, The Valley named All-Centennial teams for each of the sponsored sports. Two of the 50 men's basketball players named were from Drake's program.

Player	Years
Lewis Lloyd	1979–81
Willie McCarter	1966–69

== All-Century Team ==
Player	No.	Position	Years
Ted Payseur		Forward	1918–22
Harley Wilhelm		Forward	1919–23
Bill Boelter		Forward	1921–24
Chuck Everett		Forward	1923–27
Chuck Orebaugh		Guard	1933–37
William Evans	4	Forward	1942–43, '46–49
Walt O'Connor	20	Guard	1938–41
Gus Ollrich	4	Guard	1946–48, 1951–54
Red Murrell	33	Forward	1955–58
Gus Guydon	15	Guard	1958–61
Gene West	10	Guard	1962–65
Willie Wise	42	Forward	1967–69
Willie McCarter	15	Guard	1966–69
Dolph Pulliam	5	Forward	1966–69
Jeff Halliburton	42	Forward	1969–71
Wayne Kreklow	15	Guard	1975–79
Ken Harris	32	Forward	1973–77
Lewis Lloyd	30	Forward	1979–81
Melvin Mathis	44	Forward	1982–86
Sam Roark	32	Forward	1986–90
Lynnrick Rogers	22	Guard	1993–97

== Retired numbers ==
The Bulldogs have retired five jersey numbers, with the latest being a trio of numbers retired to honor the 1969 team, who went all the way to the Final Four.

Drake Bulldogs retired numbers
No.	Player	Career	No. ret.	Ref.
5	Dolph Pulliam	1965–1969	2009	
15	Willie McCarter	1966–1969	2009	
30	Lewis Lloyd	1979–1981	1981	
33	Red Murrell	1955–1958	1958	
42	Willie Wise	1967–1969	2009	

== Awards ==
=== Missouri Valley Conference Players of the Year ===
Player	No.	Position	Year(s) chosen
Jeff Halliburton	42	F	1971
Lewis Lloyd	30	SF	1980, 1981
Curt Smith	13	PG	1993
Adam Emmenecker	15	PG	2008
Tucker DeVries	12	G/F	2023, 2024
Bennett Stirtz	14	G	2025

=== National Coaches of the Year ===
Coach	Year(s) chosen
Keno Davis	2008

=== Missouri Valley Conference Coaches of the Year ===
Coach	Year(s) chosen
Keno Davis	2008
Darian DeVries	2019, 2021
Ben McCollum	2025

=== Men's Basketball Academic All-American of the Year ===
Player	Year(s) chosen
Adam Emmenecker	2008

== Arenas ==
First game	Last game	Home arena	Capacity
January 26, 1907	March 2, 1909	The Shed	2,500
January 25, 1910	March 15, 1919	Alumni Gymnasium	4,102
January 6, 1920	March 6, 1926	Des Moines Coliseum	6,465
January 4, 1927	March 2, 1957	Drake Fieldhouse	6,500
December 2, 1957	March 2, 1992	Veterans Memorial Auditorium	11,411
December 5, 1992	Present	Knapp Center	6,424
Total	104 seasons	6 venues	Average capacity: 6,330

== Seasons ==
- See List of Drake Bulldogs men's basketball seasons

== Postseason appearances ==
Drake has participated in four different postseason tournaments. They have an 12–10 record overall in them.

=== NCAA Division I tournament history ===
The Bulldogs have appeared in eight NCAA Tournaments. Their combined record is 7–8.

Year	Seed	Round	Opponent	Result
1969		Sweet Sixteen; Elite Eight; Final Four; Third Place Game	Texas A&M; Colorado State; UCLA; North Carolina	W 81–63; W 84–77; L 82–85; W 104–84
1970		Sweet Sixteen; Elite Eight	Houston; New Mexico State	W 92–87; L 78–87
1971		Sweet Sixteen; Elite Eight	Notre Dame; Kansas	W 79–72 ^{OT} L 71–73
2008	#5	First Round	#12 Western Kentucky	L 99–101 ^{OT}
2021	#11	First Four; First round	#11 Wichita State #6 USC	W 53–52; L 56–72
2023	#12	First Round	#5 Miami	L 56–63
2024	#10	First Round	#7 Washington State	L 61–66
2025	#11	First Round; Second Round	#6 Missouri #3 Texas Tech	W 67–57; L 64–77

=== National Invitational Tournament (NIT) history ===
The Bulldogs have appeared in three National Invitation Tournaments. Their combined record is 1–3.

Year	Round	Opponent	Result
1964	First round Second round	Pittsburgh; New Mexico	W 87–82; L 60–65
1981	First round	Minnesota	L 77–90
1986	First round	Marquette	L 59–79

=== College Basketball Invitational (CBI) history ===
The Bulldogs have appeared in one College Basketball Invitational (CBI). Their combined record is 1-1.

Year	Seed	Round	Opponent	Result
2022	No. 1	First round Quarterfinals	No. 16 Purdue Fort Wayne; No. 9 UNC Wilmington	W 87-65; L 76-75

=== CollegeInsider.com Tournament (CIT) history ===
The Bulldogs have appeared in four CollegeInsider.com Tournaments. Their combined record is 2–4.

Year	Round	Opponent	Result
2009	First round	Idaho	L 67–69
2012	First round Second round	North Dakota; Rice	W 70–64; L 68–74
2018	First round Second round	Abilene Christian; Northern Colorado	W 80–73 ^{OT} L 72–81
2019	First round	Southern Utah	L 73–80 ^{OT}

=== NCIT history ===
Drake was selected to the second and final National Commissioners Invitational Tournament ever held. They won all three games to be named NCIT champions.

Year	Round	Opponent	Result
1975	First round Semifinals; Finals	Southern California; Bowling Green; Arizona	W 80–70; W 78–65; W 83–76
