= Red Murrell (basketball) =

American basketball player

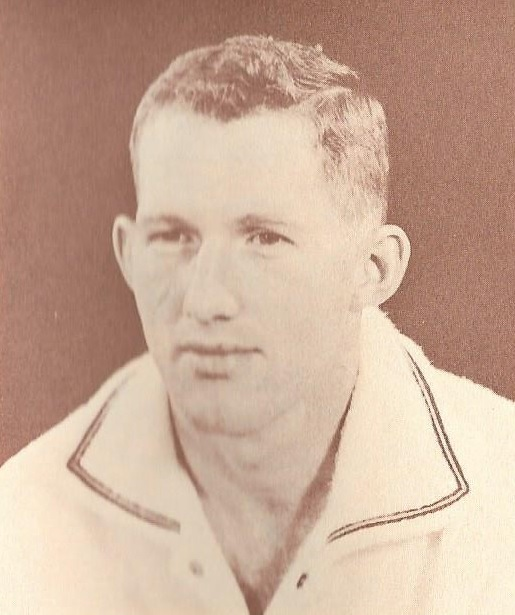
- Murrell with the Phillips 66ers.

Personal information
- Born: February 23, 1933 Linneus, Missouri, U.S.
- Died: October 31, 2017 (aged 84) Tulsa, Oklahoma, U.S.
- Listed height: 6 ft 4 in (1.93 m)
- Listed weight: 205 lb (93 kg)

Career information
- High school: Linneus (Linneus, Missouri)
- College: Moberly Area CC (1954–1955); Drake (1955–1958)
- NBA draft: 1958: 4th round, 25th overall pick
- Drafted by: Cincinnati Royals
- Position: Forward
- Number: 33

Career highlights
- AAU All-American (1960); AP Honorable mention All-American (1958); 2× First-team All-MVC (1957, 1958); No. 33 retired by Drake Bulldogs; NJCAA champion (1955)
- Stats at Basketball Reference

Phillip Ray "Red" Murrell (February 23, 1933 – October 31, 2017) was an American basketball player, best known for his college career at Drake University.

A 6'4" forward from Linneus, Missouri, Murrell originally committed to the University of Missouri, but left the school early in his freshman year. After a stint in the Army, he went to work for the Ford Motor Corporation. Upon being laid off, he returned to college, attending Moberly Area Community College on a basketball scholarship. During the 1954–55 season, Murrell was a second-team NJCAA All-American and led Moberly to the NJCAA national title and was named to the all-tournament team.

Following his season at Moberly, Murrell transferred to Drake. In his three varsity seasons, Murrell scored 1,657 points for his career (22.7 points per game), leaving as the school's all-time leading scorer – a record that stood until 2010. He was drafted by the Cincinnati Royals after his junior season, but opted to return to Drake for the 1957–58 season. That year Murrell set another school scoring mark, averaging 26.7 points per game, fifth in the nation. He was named an honorable mention All-American by the Associated Press and was a first-team All-Missouri Valley Conference choice. In his final game, Murrell set the Drake single-game scoring mark with a 51-point outburst against Houston.

Following his college career, Murrell was drafted by the Minneapolis Lakers in the fourth round of the 1958 NBA draft (25th overall). Instead, he signed with the Phillips 66ers of the Amateur Athletic Union (AAU), where in 1960 he was named an AAU All-American.

Murrell was the first player in Drake school history to have his number retired. He has also been named to the Iowa Sports Hall of Fame and the NJCAA Basketball Hall of Fame.

Murrell died on October 31, 2017, in Tulsa, Oklahoma, from heart disease.
