= Jeff Jacobson =

Jeff Jacobson may refer to:

- Jeff Jacobson (politician), Ohio State Senator
- Jeff Jacobson (photographer) (1946-2020), American photographer
- Jeff Jacobson (CEO), former CEO of Xerox Corporation
- Jeffrey E. Jacobson, American lawyer
