= Maury John =

American college basketball coach

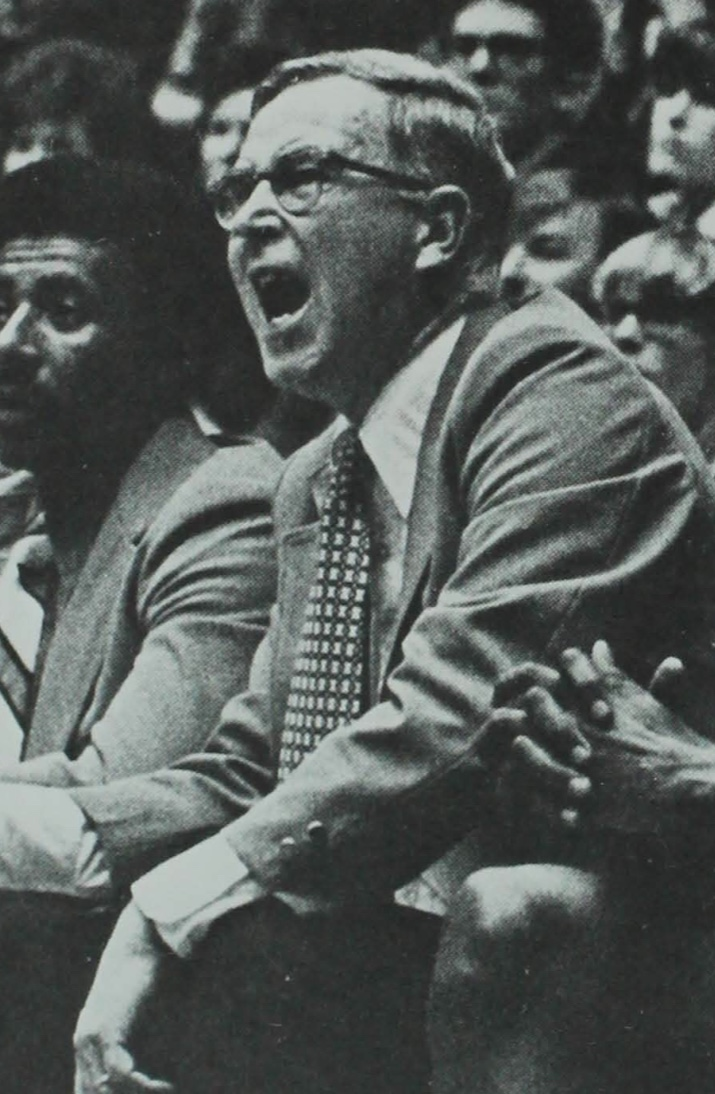
- John from the 1973 Bomb

Biographical details
- Born: June 17, 1919; Sweet Springs, Missouri, U.S.
- Died: October 15, 1974 (aged 55)
- Education: Central Missouri State

Coaching career (HC unless noted)
- 1946–1958: Moberly Junior College
- 1958–1971: Drake
- 1971–1974: Iowa State

Head coaching record
- Overall: 528–214 (college) (.712)
- Tournaments: 5–3 (NCAA); 1–1 (NIT)

Accomplishments and honors

Championships
- NCAA Regional—Final Four (1969); 2 NJCAA tournament (1954, 1955); 4 MVC regular season (1964, 1969–1971)

Awards
- USBWA Coach of the Year (1969); 4× MVC Coach of the Year (1964, 1968–1970)

Maurice E. John (June 17, 1919 – October 15, 1974) was an American college basketball coach at Drake University and Iowa State University. John is the all–time wins leader at Drake and led the Bulldogs to the NCAA Final Four in 1969. In his 28-year coaching career, John had a 528–214 record. John died of cancer at age 55 in 1974, while coaching at Iowa State.

== Early life ==
John was born June 17, 1919, in Sweet Springs, Missouri. He attended William Jewell College for two years before transferring to Central Missouri State, graduating in 1941 with a Bachelor of Science in education. He went on to earn his master's degree in education at the University of Missouri.

== Basketball coaching career ==
After graduating from college, John coached at Union High School in Union, Missouri, for a year. He went on to serve in the Air Force during World War II. He continued coaching the Lubbock, Texas Air Force Base basketball team. After being discharged in 1946, John was named head coach at Moberly Junior College.

=== Moberly Junior College (1946–1958) ===
John began his collegiate coaching career starting the basketball program at Moberly Junior College in Moberly, Missouri. He compiled a 285–58 record (.831) for Moberly in 12 seasons from 1946 to 1958. John led Moberly to back–to–back NJCAA National Championships in 1954 and 1955. He was followed at Moberly by future NBA coach Cotton Fitzsimmons, who led Moberly to another two NJCAA National Championships.

=== Drake University (1958–1971) ===
John moved from Moberly to Drake University of the Missouri Valley Conference in Des Moines, Iowa, in 1958. He would have a 211–131 record at Drake.

In 1963–64, John led Drake (21–7) to its first 20 win season and into the postseason, with an invitation to the 12–team 1964 National Invitation Tournament at Madison Square Garden in New York City. There, the Bulldogs defeated Pittsburgh 87–82, before losing to New Mexico in the Elite Eight, 65–60.

He led Drake (26–5) to the 1969 Final Four of the 1969 NCAA University Division basketball tournament, where the cinderella Bulldogs gave powerhouse UCLA and Lew Alcindor a scare on their way to the NCAA Championship. The game has been labeled as "the greatest near upset in NCAA Tournament history."

In the 1969 NCAA Tournament, Drake opened by defeating Texas A&M 81–63 in the round of 16 after receiving a bye in the 25–team tournament. The Bulldogs then defeated Colorado State 84–77 to win the Midwest Region and advance to the Final Four.

In the 1969 Final Four, Drake lost to Alcindor and Coach John Wooden's UCLA dynasty squad 85–82 on March 20, 1969, in the National Semi–Final. Drake, down 41–39 at halftime was close with the #1 ranked team the entire game, behind 24 points from Willie McCarter, 13 points with 16 rebounds from Willie Wise, a famous block of an Alcinder shot by Rick Wanamaker and strong defense by Dolph Pulliam. UCLA led 83–74 with one minute 12 seconds left, but Drake scored eight straight points and UCLA now had a one–point lead in the final minute of play. The Bruins went on to beat Purdue by 20 points (92–72) in the Championship game, en route to seven consecutive NCAA Championships.

The Los Angeles Times gave an account of the closing moments: "Late in the game, UCLA led by three, but Drake had the ball and the momentum. Guard Willie McCarter put up a jumper from the left corner that ricocheted around the rim before falling into the hands of Drake forward Dolph Pulliam, who went straight back up with it. On the way up, Pulliam was hammered by Alcindor and Curtis Rowe, but the ball somehow made it through the hoop. The basket counted, but no foul was called against the Bruins. Eight seconds remained, and Drake trailed by one. UCLA escaped the Bulldogs' full-court press and got a pass through to Lynn Shackelford. In desperation, Drake's Ron Gwin fouled him. Shackelford made both of his one-and-one attempts."

Regarding the UCLA loss, McCarter reflected. "My mother always told me that God never gives you anything you can't handle," McCarter said. "That's what I thought about Coach John. He never gave us anything we couldn't handle. In that 1969 game against UCLA, for one special moment he had us all believing we were more than what we really were."

After the game, when asked what was the matter with UCLA, John Wooden replied simply, "Drake."

In the 1969 3rd Place Game, the Bulldogs continued their strong play as they defeated Coach Dean Smith's ACC Champion North Carolina Tar Heels, with Charlie Scott convincingly, 104–84, behind 28 points from Willie McCarter.

John proceeded to lead Drake to the 1970 and 1971 NCAA Tournaments as well, and both times led the Bulldogs to the Elite Eight. In the 1970 NCAA tournament, Drake (22–7) defeated Coach Guy Lewis and Houston, with Dwight Davis, 92–87, before losing to New Mexico State 87–78 in the Midwest Regional Final.

In the 1971 NCAA tournament, Drake (21–8) defeated Notre Dame with Austin Carr 79–72 in overtime, then lost to Kansas 73–71 in the Midwest Regional Final. His final Drake team averaged 83 points per game before the advent of the three–point shot.

John became known for his "belly–button" defense, in which he pushed his players to stick out their stomachs and play face–to–face. It was noted that John, during that turbulent era was one of the first to hire a black assistant coach and have a black and white player room together in the same hotel room on road trips, even in the deep South.

=== Iowa State University (1971–1973) ===
In 1971, John left Drake to move to nearby Iowa State University in Ames, Iowa. John inherited an Iowa State team that finished 5–21 in the previous season. John would compile a 32–25 record in rebuilding the Iowa State program.

"I'm sure some of the fans never understood the reasons why he left, or tolerated them," said Paul Morrison, who was Drake's sports information director and business manager during John's tenure. "This was a great opportunity for the guy to step up the ladder." Iowa States' Hilton Coliseum was ready to open and John had tired of scheduling conflicts with Veterans Memorial Auditorium, having longed for a campus facility at Drake.

John led Iowa State in an improved 12–14 record in his first season. On Dec. 2, 1971, John coached ISU to a 71–54 victory over Arizona in the first game played at Hilton Coliseum. In 1972–73, John led the Cyclones to a 16–10 record, a 15-year best for Iowa State. John's final game as head coach was played in Des Moines against Drake, and was the first loss of his third season, 61–60.

=== Illness and death ===
In the 1973–74 season, Iowa State was off to a 4–1 start. John sat out the rest of the 1973–74 season after a cancer diagnosis. Assistant Gus Guydon (11–10) finished the season.

In October 1973, John had been having trouble sleeping and went to see a doctor. Two months later, on the day Iowa State team lost at Drake, John was told he had an inoperable malignant tumor at the base of his esophagus. "It was a bolt out of the blue for someone who lived his life free of smoking or drinking," His son John said later. "There was high stress. But he was always healthy."

John hoped to return to coaching Iowa State in 1974–75, but his health worsened. He resigned because of his health on July 30, 1974. John said "It's going to be hard for me not to be on that bench. I won't have to sweat out all those games down on the floor. But truthfully, I'd rather be down there sweating them out."

Maury John died on October 15, 1974, at the age of 55.

During his 28-year coaching career, John's teams won 528 games and lost 214.

== Personal ==
Maury John was married to Jean (d. 2009), and they had two children, John and Maurice Jr.

"They say a Rolls-Royce increases in value the older it gets," said Willie McCarter. "That is what Coach John is to us. The more I look back, the more I realize how important he was to our lives. Coach John took racism out of the Drake vocabulary. Coach John made us all take a role," McCarter added. "He made everyone feel that without them, the wheel wouldn't go around. He made every spoke in the wheel as important as the other. That made you want to go out and bust your butt for him. I'd give it all up if he could still be here. Selfishly, I've needed to talk to him more than once."

“I echo what my teammates have said,” former player Willie Wise stated. “I'm so appreciative to Maurice John. He came out and got this little kid from San Francisco and brought me to Iowa. I had never been in the Midwest, never been out of California. I owe basically what I am today because of Maurice John and Drake.”

== Honors ==
- John is a member of The Des Moines Sunday Register's Iowa Sports Hall of Fame.
- John was inducted into the NJCAA Men's Basketball Coaches Association's Hall of Fame in 1984.
- John was inducted into the Missouri Valley Conference Hall of Fame in 2000.
- The "Fitzsimmons-John Arena," (built in 1998) is the arena at Moberly Area Community College. It is named for John and his successor as coach at Moberly, Cotton Fitzsimmons.

== Media ==
A documentary on the 1968–69 Drake Basketball team was made in 2004 by filmmaker Jacob Adams of Impossible Productions and is available from his website. Most of the UCLA—Drake game was recreated with an old coach's film and radio play by play. Intercut are commentaries by Drake players and coaches.

== Head coaching record ==
=== College ===
Record table
Season	Team	Overall	Conference	Standing	Postseason
Drake Bulldogs (Missouri Valley Conference) (1958–1971)
1958–59	Drake	9–15	4–10	6th	
1959–60	Drake	11–14	4–10	7th	
1960–61	Drake	19–7	7–5	T–3rd	
1961–62	Drake	16–8	6–6	4th	
1962–63	Drake	11–14	3–9	7th	
1963–64	Drake	21–7	10–2	T–1st	NIT second round
1964–65	Drake	13–12	6–8	6th	
1965–66	Drake	15–10	6–8	T–6th	
1966–67	Drake	9–16	4–10	T–7th	
1967–68	Drake	18–8	9–7	T–4th	
1968–69	Drake	26–5	13–3	T–1st	NCAA University Division Third Place
1969–70	Drake	22–7	14–2	1st	NCAA University Division Elite Eight
1970–71	Drake	21–8	9–5	T–1st	NCAA University Division Elite Eight
Drake:		211–131 (.617)	95–85		
Iowa State Cyclones (Big Eight Conference) (1971–1974)
1971–72	Iowa State	12–14	5–9	6th	
1972–73	Iowa State	16–10	7–7	5th	
1973–74	Iowa State	4–1	N/A	N/A	
Iowa State:		32–25	12–16		
Total:		243–156 (.609)			
National champion Postseason invitational champion Conference regular season champion Conference regular season and conference tournament champion Division regular season champion Division regular season and conference tournament champion Conference tournament champion

== See also ==
- List of NCAA Division I Men's Final Four appearances by coach
