= 1971–72 Iowa State Cyclones men's basketball team =

American college basketball season

1971–72 Iowa State Cyclones men's basketball
- Conference: Big Eight Conference
- Record: 12–14 (5–9 Big Eight)
- Head coach: Maury John (1st season)
- Home arena: Hilton Coliseum

The 1971–72 Iowa State Cyclones men's basketball team represented Iowa State University during the 1971–72 NCAA Division I men's basketball season. The Cyclones were coached by Maury John, who was in his first season with the Cyclones. They played their home games at Hilton Coliseum in Ames, Iowa. Hilton Coliseum hosted its first Iowa State men's basketball game on December 2, a 71–54 win over Arizona.

They finished the season 12–14, 5–9 in Big Eight play to finish in sixth place.

1971–72 Big Eight Conference men's basketball standings
| | Conf. | | | | Overall |
| Team | W | | L | PCT | W | | L | PCT |
|---|---|---|---|---|---|---|---|---|
| Kansas State | 12 | – | 2 | .857 | 19 | – | 9 | .679 |
| Missouri | 10 | – | 4 | .714 | 21 | – | 6 | .778 |
| Oklahoma | 9 | – | 5 | .643 | 14 | – | 12 | .538 |
| Nebraska | 7 | – | 7 | .500 | 14 | – | 12 | .538 |
| Kansas | 7 | – | 7 | .500 | 11 | – | 15 | .423 |
| Iowa State | 5 | – | 9 | .357 | 12 | – | 14 | .462 |
| Colorado | 4 | – | 10 | .286 | 7 | – | 19 | .269 |
| Oklahoma State | 2 | – | 12 | .143 | 4 | – | 22 | .154 |
Rankings from AP Poll

== Roster ==
1971–72 Iowa State Cyclones men's basketball team
Players
Coaches

| Pos. | # | Name | Height | Weight | Year | Hometown |
|---|---|---|---|---|---|---|
| | | Gregg Barcus | 6 ft 7 in (2.01 m) | — | Jr |
| F | | Sam Brown | 6 ft 6 in (1.98 m) | — |
| G | | Mike Capobianco | — | — | So |
| | | Jerry Cutshall | — | — |
| G | | Martinez Denmon | 6 ft 2 in (1.88 m) | — |
| F | | Rick Engel | 6 ft 4 in (1.93 m) | — | Sr |
| | | Larry Gibson | 6 ft 6 in (1.98 m) | — |
| F | | Clint Harris | 6 ft 7 in (2.01 m) | — |
| F | | Jim Heck | 6 ft 6 in (1.98 m) | — |
| G | | Eric Heft | 6 ft 1 in (1.85 m) | — | So |
| G | | Gene Mack | 6 ft 1 in (1.85 m) | — | Sr |
| G | | Jim Miller | 5 ft 9 in (1.75 m) | — | Sr |
| C | | Tom O'Connor | 7 ft 0 in (2.13 m) | — |
| | | Jim Reinebach | — | — | Jr |
| | | Robbie Robinson | — | — | Jr |
| F | | Wayne Williams | 6 ft 6 in (1.98 m) | — |

Head coach

- Maury John

Assistant coach(es)

Legend

- (C) Team captain
- (S) Suspended
- (I) Ineligible
- (W) Walk-on
- Injured
- Current redshirt

== Schedule and results ==
| Date time, TV | Rank^{#} | Opponent^{#} | Result | Record | Site city, state |
Regular season
| December 2, 1971*; 7:35 pm, WOI | | Arizona | W 71–54 | 1–0 | Hilton Coliseum (14,350); Ames, Iowa |
| December 4, 1971*; 7:35 pm, WOI (delay) | | Minnesota | L 58–72 | 1–1 | Hilton Coliseum (13,500); Ames, Iowa |
| December 7, 1971*; 7:35 pm, WHO/KWWL/KVFD | | at Drake; Iowa Big Four | W 83–80 | 2–1 | Veterans Memorial Auditorium (12,000); Des Moines, Iowa |
| December 10, 1971*; 10:00 pm, KTLA (delay) | | at No. 1 UCLA | L 81–110 | 2–2 | Pauley Pavilion (12,565); Los Angeles |
| December 11, 1971*; 10:05 pm | | at UC-Santa Barbara | L 70–85 | 2–3 | Robertson Gymnasium (2,100); Santa Barbara, California |
| December 14, 1971*; 7:35 pm, WOI (delay) | | Illinois State | W 106–85 | 3–3 | Hilton Coliseum (7,000); Ames, Iowa |
| December 18, 1971*; 7:35 pm, WOI | | Iowa; CyHawk Rivalry | W 97–94 | 4–3 | Hilton Coliseum (14,600); Ames, Iowa |
| December 20, 1971*; 7:35 pm, WOI (delay) | | No. 10 USC | L 86–89 | 4–4 | Hilton Coliseum (13,000); Ames, Iowa |
| December 23, 1971*; 7:30 pm | | at Arkansas | W 96–93 | 5–4 | Barton Coliseum (3,500); Little Rock, Arkansas |
| December 28, 1971*; 7:00 pm | | vs. Kansas; Big Eight Holiday Tournament Quarterfinals | W 91–88 | 6–4 | Municipal Auditorium (10,500); Kansas City, Missouri |
| December 29, 1971*; 9:00 pm | | vs. Kansas State; Big Eight Holiday Tournament Semifinals | L 75–92 | 6–5 | Municipal Auditorium; Kansas City, Missouri |
| December 30, 1971*; 3:00 pm | | vs. Colorado; Big Eight Holiday Tournament Third Place | W 87–82 | 7–5 | Municipal Auditorium; Kansas City, Missouri |
| January 8, 1972; 7:35 pm | | Oklahoma | L 72–77 | 7–6 (0–1) | Hilton Coliseum (14,000); Ames, Iowa |
| January 15, 1972; 7:35 pm | | at Kansas State | L 53–69 | 7–7 (0–2) | Ahearn Fieldhouse (12,100); Manhattan, Kansas |
| January 17, 1972; 7:35 pm, WOI (delay) | | Colorado | W 76–59 | 8–7 (1–2) | Hilton Coliseum (12,000); Ames, Iowa |
| January 22, 1972; 7:35 pm | | at Missouri | L 75–89 | 8–8 (1–3) | Brewer Fieldhouse (5,800); Columbia, Missouri |
| January 24, 1972; 8:05 pm | | at Kansas | L 71–74 | 8–9 (1–4) | Allen Fieldhouse (12,200); Lawrence, Kansas |
| January 29, 1972; 2:15 pm, Big Eight | | Oklahoma State | W 75–72 | 9–9 (2–4) | Hilton Coliseum (10,000); Ames, Iowa |
| February 5, 1972; 7:35 pm | | Kansas | W 84–83 | 10–9 (3–4) | Hilton Coliseum (13,000); Ames, Iowa |
| February 7, 1972; 7:35 pm, WOI (delay) | | No. 15 Missouri | L 72–77 | 10–10 (3–5) | Hilton Coliseum (12,000); Ames, Iowa |
| February 12, 1972; 2:15 pm, Big Eight | | at Nebraska | L 71–76 | 10–11 (3–6) | Nebraska Coliseum (4,500); Lincoln, Nebraska |
| February 14, 1972; 8:05 pm | | at Colorado | L 75–82 | 10–12 (3–7) | Balch Fieldhouse (1,545); Boulder, Colorado |
| February 19, 1972; 7:35 pm, WOI (delay) | | Kansas State | L 54–68 | 10–13 (3–8) | Hilton Coliseum (12,500); Ames, Iowa |
| March 1, 1972; 7:35 pm | | at Oklahoma State | W 64–62 | 11–13 (4–8) | Gallagher Hall (2,200); Stillwater, Oklahoma |
| March 3, 1972; 7:35 pm | | at Oklahoma | L 77–82 | 11–14 (4–9) | OU Field House (3,200); Norman, Oklahoma |
| March 6, 1972; 7:35 pm, WOI (delay) | | Nebraska | W 76–67 | 12–14 (5–9) | Hilton Coliseum (13,000); Ames, Iowa |
*Non-conference game. ^{#}Rankings from AP poll. (#) Tournament seedings in parentheses. All times are in Central Time.
