= 1969–70 Drake Bulldogs men's basketball team =

American college basketball season

1969–70 Drake Bulldogs men's basketball

Missouri Valley Conference Champions

NCAA tournament, Elite Eight
- Conference: Missouri Valley Conference

Ranking
- Coaches: No. 9
- AP: No. 14
- Record: 22–7 (14–2 MVC)
- Head coach: Maury John (12th season)
- Assistant coaches: Dan Callahan; Gus Guydon
- Home arena: Veterans Memorial Auditorium

1969–70 Missouri Valley Conference men's basketball standings
| | Conf. | | | | Overall |
| Team | W | | L | PCT | W | | L | PCT |
|---|---|---|---|---|---|---|---|---|
| No. 14 Drake | 14 | – | 2 | .875 | 22 | – | 7 | .759 |
| Cincinnati | 12 | – | 4 | .750 | 21 | – | 6 | .778 |
| North Texas State | 11 | – | 5 | .688 | 18 | – | 8 | .692 |
| Louisville | 11 | – | 5 | .688 | 18 | – | 9 | .667 |
| Tulsa | 9 | – | 8 | .529 | 15 | – | 11 | .577 |
| Bradley | 7 | – | 9 | .438 | 14 | – | 12 | .538 |
| Saint Louis | 5 | – | 11 | .313 | 9 | – | 17 | .346 |
| Wichita State | 3 | – | 13 | .188 | 8 | – | 18 | .308 |
| Memphis State | 1 | – | 16 | .059 | 6 | – | 20 | .231 |
Rankings from AP Poll

The 1969–70 Drake Bulldogs men's basketball team represented Drake University as a member of the Missouri Valley Conference during the 1969–70 NCAA University Division men's basketball season. The team was led by 12th-year head coach Maury John and played their home games at Veterans Memorial Auditorium in Des Moines, Iowa. The Bulldogs were 14–2 in Missouri Valley Conference play to capture the league title.

Drake received a bid to the NCAA tournament where they defeated Houston in the regional semifinal. The Bulldogs would fall short of their second straight Final Four, losing to New Mexico State in the regional final, 87–78.

== Previous season ==
The Bulldogs reached the Final Four of the NCAA tournament and, with their third-place finish, Drake had their best-ever NCAA finish as of the start of the 2023–2024 season. The Bulldogs completed the season with a 26–5 record and were ranked number 11 in both major polls.

== Roster ==
1969–70 Drake Bulldogs men's basketball team
Players
Coaches

| Pos. | # | Name | Height | Weight | Year | Hometown |
|---|---|---|---|---|---|---|
| F | 5 | Dale Gordon | 6 ft 7 in (2.01 m) | 205 lb (93 kg) | So | Creston, Iowa |
| G | 22 | Gary Zeller | 6 ft 2 in (1.88 m) | 190 lb (86 kg) | Sr | Houston, Texas |
| F | 41 | Al Williams | 6 ft 6 in (1.98 m) | 195 lb (88 kg) | Sr | Peoria, Illinois |
| G/F | 42 | Jeff Halliburton | 6 ft 5 in (1.96 m) | 190 lb (86 kg) | Jr | Rockville Centre, New York |
| C | 43 | Rick Wanamaker | 6 ft 9 in (2.06 m) | 210 lb (95 kg) | Sr | Marengo, Iowa |

Head coach

- Maury John

Assistant coach(es)

Legend

- (C) Team captain
- (S) Suspended
- (I) Ineligible
- (W) Walk-on
- Injured
- Current redshirt

== Schedule and results ==
| Date time, TV | Rank^{#} | Opponent^{#} | Result | Record | Site city, state |
Non-conference regular season
| Dec 1, 1969* | No. 19 | Wisconsin-Platteville | W 106–80 | 1–0 | Veterans Memorial Auditorium; Des Moines, Iowa |
| Dec 6, 1969* | No. 19 | Iowa State | W 86–62 | 2–0 | Veterans Memorial Auditorium; Des Moines, Iowa |
| Dec 8, 1969* | | Pacific | W 78–76 | 3–0 | Veterans Memorial Auditorium; Des Moines, Iowa |
| Dec 11, 1969* | | at No. 12 Marquette | L 70–72 | 3–1 | Milwaukee Arena; Milwaukee, Wisconsin |
| Dec 13, 1969* | | Los Angeles State | W 115–109 | 4–1 | Veterans Memorial Auditorium; Des Moines, Iowa |
| Dec 16, 1969* | | Nevada | W 101–75 | 5–1 | Veterans Memorial Auditorium; Des Moines, Iowa |
| Dec 20, 1969* | | at Minnesota | L 76–79 | 5–2 | Williams Arena; Minneapolis, Minnesota |
| Dec 22, 1969* | | at Iowa | L 78–101 | 5–3 | Iowa Field House; Iowa City, Iowa |
| Dec 28, 1969* | | vs. San Francisco; Rainbow Classic | L 67–69 | 5–4 | Neal S. Blaisdell Center; Honolulu, Hawaii |
| Dec 29, 1969* | | vs. Hawaii; Rainbow Classic | W 102–76 | 6–4 | Neal S. Blaisdell Center; Honolulu, Hawaii |
Missouri Valley Conference regular season
| Jan 3, 1970 | | Saint Louis | W 80–78 | 7–4 (1–0) | Veterans Memorial Auditorium; Des Moines, Iowa |
| Jan 5, 1970 | | Memphis State | W 72–62 | 8–4 (2–0) | Veterans Memorial Auditorium; Des Moines, Iowa |
| Jan 8, 1970 | | Wichita State | W 98–85 | 9–4 (3–0) | Veterans Memorial Auditorium; Des Moines, Iowa |
| Jan 10, 1970 | | at Tulsa | W 77–73 | 10–4 (4–0) | Expo Square Pavilion; Tulsa, Oklahoma |
| Jan 14, 1970 | | at Bradley | W 65–55 | 11–4 (5–0) | Robertson Memorial Field House; Peoria, Illinois |
| Jan 17, 1970 | | Cincinnati | W 63–57 | 12–4 (6–0) | Veterans Memorial Auditorium; Des Moines, Iowa |
| Jan 24, 1970 | | No. 18 Louisville | W 86–75 | 13–4 (7–0) | Veterans Memorial Auditorium; Des Moines, Iowa |
| Jan 29, 1970 | No. 16 | North Texas State | W 95–84 | 14–4 (8–0) | Veterans Memorial Auditorium; Des Moines, Iowa |
| Jan 31, 1970 | No. 16 | at Memphis State | W 82–76 | 15–4 (9–0) | Mid-South Coliseum; Memphis, Tennessee |
| Feb 6, 1970* | No. 13 | at Tulane | W 98–92 | 16–4 | Avron B. Fogelman Arena; New Orleans, Louisiana |
| Feb 10, 1970 | No. 11 | at North Texas State | L 81–93 | 16–5 (9–1) | North Texas Men's Gym; Denton, Texas |
| Feb 12, 1970 | No. 11 | Bradley | W 68–65 | 17–5 (10–1) | Veterans Memorial Auditorium; Des Moines, Iowa |
| Feb 19, 1970 | No. 17 | at Wichita State | W 90–83 | 18–5 (11–1) | Levitt Arena; Wichita, Kansas |
| Feb 21, 1970 | No. 17 | Tulsa | W 80–74 | 19–5 (12–1) | Veterans Memorial Auditorium; Des Moines, Iowa |
| Feb 24, 1970 | No. 16 | at Cincinnati | L 72–88 | 19–6 (12–2) | Armory Fieldhouse; Cincinnati, Ohio |
| Feb 28, 1970 | No. 16 | at Louisville | W 79–73 | 20–6 (13–2) | Freedom Hall; Louisville, Kentucky |
| Mar 5, 1970 | No. 14 | at Saint Louis | W 85–80 | 21–6 (14–2) | St. Louis Arena; St. Louis, Missouri |
NCAA tournament
| Mar 12, 1970* | No. 14 | vs. No. 12 Houston | W 92–87 | 22–6 | Allen Fieldhouse; Lawrence, Kansas |
| Mar 14, 1970* | No. 14 | vs. No. 5 New Mexico State | L 78–87 | 22–7 | Allen Fieldhouse; Lawrence, Kansas |
*Non-conference game. ^{#}Rankings from AP Poll. (#) Tournament seedings in parentheses.
