= List of Drake Bulldogs men's basketball head coaches =

The following is a list of Drake Bulldogs men's basketball head coaches at the Drake University in Des Moines, Iowa. The Drake Bulldogs men's basketball program has been led by 30 head coaches in their 115 season history. The sortable list below is by number of total Drake Bulldog program wins.

Maury John led the Drake Bulldogs to the NCAA Division I Men's Final Four in 1969 and NCAA Tournament - Sweet 16 appearances in 1969, 1970 and 1971. The team is currently led by first-year coach Eric Henderson.

Tenure	Coach	Years	Record	Pct.
1958–1971	Maury John	13	211–131	.617
1932–1943	Evan O. Williams	11	113–115	.496
1981–1988	Gary Garner	7	95–104	.477
1974–1981	Bob Ortegel	7	91–103	.469
1948–1956	Jack McClelland	8	90–105	.462
2008–2013	Mark Phelps	5	77–86	.472
2018–2024	Darian DeVries	5	150–55	.732
1990–1996	Rudy Washington	6	63–102	.382
1997–2003	Kurt Kanaskie	7	62–136	.313
2003–2007	Tom Davis	4	54–66	.450
1926–1932	Bill Boelter	7	46–86	.348
1921–1925	Ossie Solem	4	37–31	.544
1971–1974	Howard Stacey	3	34–44	.436
1946–1948	Forddy Anderson	2	32–23	.582
1918–1921	Mark Banks	3	32–37	.464
2013–2016	Ray Giacoletti	4	32–69	.317
2007–2008	Keno Davis	1	28–5	.848
1988–1990	Tom Abatemarco	2	23–29	.442
1944–1946	Vee Green	2	22–28	.440
1956–1958	John Benington	2	21–28	.429
2017–2018	Niko Medved	1	17–17	.500
1914–1916	Ray Whisman	2	8–15	.348
1943-1944	Bill Easton	1	7–13	.350
1906–1909	Charles Pell	3	6–12	.333
2016–2017	Jeff Rutter	1	6–17	.261
1916–1917	Ralph Glaze	1	5–7	.417
1990	Eddie Fields	1	2–6	.250
1917–1918	S.W. Hobbs	1	2–17	.105
1909–1910; 1912–1914	John Griffith	3	2–24	.077
1911–1912	A.R. Hackett	2	1–14	.067
2024–2025	Ben McCollum	1	31–4	.886
2025–present	Eric Henderson	1	14–20	.412
1907–Present	31 coaches	119 seasons	Record	Pct.
