= 1973–74 Iowa State Cyclones men's basketball team =

American college basketball season

1973–74 Iowa State Cyclones men's basketball
- Conference: Big Eight Conference
- Record: 15–11 (6–8 Big Eight)
- Head coach: Maury John (3rd season); Gus Guydon (interim)
- Assistant coaches: Gus Guydon; Tom Smith
- Home arena: Hilton Coliseum

The 1973–74 Iowa State Cyclones men's basketball team represented Iowa State University during the 1973–74 NCAA Division I men's basketball season. The Cyclones were coached by Maury John, who was in his third season with the Cyclones. John was diagnosed with cancer early in the season and stepped away, with Gus Guydon taking over as interim head coach. They played their home games at Hilton Coliseum in Ames, Iowa.

They finished the season 15–11, 6–8 in Big Eight play to finish in fifth place.

1973–74 Big Eight Conference men's basketball standings
	Conf.				Overall
Team	W		L	PCT	W		L	PCT
No. 7 Kansas	13	–	1	.929	23	–	7	.767
Kansas State	11	–	3	.786	19	–	8	.704
Oklahoma	9	–	5	.643	18	–	8	.692
Nebraska	7	–	7	.500	14	–	12	.538
Iowa State	6	–	8	.429	15	–	11	.577
Colorado	4	–	10	.286	9	–	17	.346
Missouri	3	–	11	.214	12	–	14	.462
Oklahoma State	3	–	11	.214	9	–	17	.346
Rankings from AP Poll

== Roster ==
1973–74 Iowa State Cyclones men's basketball team
Players
Coaches

Pos.	#	Name	Height	Weight	Year	Hometown
F	31	Mike Benjamin	6 ft 6 in (1.98 m)	—	So	LaPorte, Indiana
G	54	Bill Benson	6 ft 2 in (1.88 m)	—
G	10	Jeff Branstetter	6 ft 0 in (1.83 m)	170 lb (77 kg)	So	Harlan, Iowa
F	42	Steve Burgason	6 ft 7 in (2.01 m)	—	Fr	Ames, Iowa
G	24	Mike Capobianco	—	—	Sr
C	44	Craig DeLoss	6 ft 10 in (2.08 m)	—	Jr	Spencer, Iowa
	12	Fred Frommelt	—	—
F	32	Wes Harris (C)	6 ft 8 in (2.03 m)	—
G	14	Eric Heft (C)	6 ft 1 in (1.85 m)	—	Sr
G	34	Hercle Ivy	6 ft 3 in (1.91 m)	—	So	St. Louis, Missouri
	42	John John	—	—	Jr	Des Moines, Iowa
C	52	Larry Loots	6 ft 9 in (2.06 m)	—	Jr	Ames, Iowa
C	50	Alex Mazeika	6 ft 10 in (2.08 m)	—	Fr	Clinton, Iowa
	33	Jim Thorup	—	—	Fr	Des Moines, Iowa
F	40	Robert Wilson	6 ft 6 in (1.98 m)	—

Head coach

- Maury John

Assistant coach(es)

Gus Guydon
Tom Smith

Legend

- (C) Team captain
- (S) Suspended
- (I) Ineligible
- (W) Walk-on
- Injured
- Current redshirt

== Schedule and results ==
Date time, TV	Rank^{#}	Opponent^{#}	Result	Record	Site city, state
Exhibition
November 16, 1973*; 7:35 pm		Yugoslavian National Team; Exhibition	L 96–97 ^{2OT}		Hilton Coliseum (5,000); Ames, Iowa
Regular season
December 1, 1973*; 7:35 pm		Western Illinois	W 84–81 ^{OT}	1–0	Hilton Coliseum (10,200); Ames, Iowa
December 4, 1973*; 7:35 pm		South Dakota	W 103–67	2–0	Hilton Coliseum (7,680); Ames, Iowa
December 8, 1973*; 7:35 pm		Bradley	W 81–62	3–0	Hilton Coliseum (10,600); Ames, Iowa
December 11, 1973*; 7:35 pm, WOI (delay)		San Jose State	W 83–60	4–0	Hilton Coliseum (9,100); Ames, Iowa
December 15, 1973*; 7:35 pm		at Drake; Iowa's Big Four	L 60–61	4–1	Veterans Memorial Auditorium (11,200); Des Moines, Iowa
December 18, 1973*; 7:35 pm, WOI (delay)		San Francisco State	W 77–65	5–1	Hilton Coliseum (8,100); Ames, Iowa
December 21, 1973*; 7:30 pm		at Tulsa	L 69–79	5–2	Expo Square Pavilion (3,378); Tulsa, Oklahoma
December 27, 1973*; 9:00 pm		vs. Oklahoma State; Big Eight Holiday Tournament Quarterfinals	W 73–50	6–2	Municipal Auditorium (6,826); Kansas City, Missouri
December 28, 1973*; 9:00 pm		vs. No. 18 Kansas State; Big Eight Holiday Tournament Semifinals	W 61–55	7–2	Municipal Auditorium (10,200); Kansas City, Missouri
December 29, 1973*; 9:00 pm		vs. Missouri; Big Eight Holiday Tournament Championship	L 78–80	7–3	Municipal Auditorium (10,200); Kansas City, Missouri
January 5, 1974*; 7:35 pm, WOI (delay)		UW-River Falls	W 107–61	8–3	Hilton Coliseum (5,800); Ames, Iowa
January 7, 1974*; 7:35 pm, WOI (delay)		Iowa; CyHawk Rivalry	W 94–77	9–3	Hilton Coliseum (14,800); Ames, Iowa
January 12, 1974; 2:00 pm		at Missouri	L 83–91	9–4 (0–1)	Hearnes Center (7,378); Columbia, Missouri
January 15, 1974; 7:35 pm, WOI (delay)		Kansas	L 69–73	9–5 (0–2)	Hilton Coliseum (10,200); Ames, Iowa
January 19, 1974; 8:35 pm		at Colorado	W 81–66	10–5 (1–2)	Balch Fieldhouse (2,242); Boulder, Colorado
January 21, 1974; 7:35 pm, WOI (delay)		Oklahoma	L 69–71 ^{OT}	10–6 (1–3)	Hilton Coliseum (10,100); Ames, Iowa
January 26, 1974; 7:35 pm		at Kansas State	L 66–92	10–7 (1–4)	Ahearn Fieldhouse (11,700); Manhattan, Kansas
February 2, 1974; 7:35 pm, WOI (delay)		Oklahoma State	W 78–75	11–7 (2–4)	Hilton Coliseum (10,500); Ames, Iowa
February 5, 1974; 7:35 pm		at Nebraska	L 88–91 ^{3OT}	11–8 (2–5)	Nebraska Coliseum (4,100); Lincoln, Nebraska
February 9, 1974; 2:00 pm, WOI		Kansas State	L 56–72	11–9 (2–6)	Hilton Coliseum (11,000); Ames, Iowa
February 11, 1974; 7:35 pm, WOI (delay)		Missouri	W 79–75	12–9 (3–6)	Hilton Coliseum (9,200); Ames, Iowa
February 16, 1974; 2:00 pm, Big Eight		at No. 16 Kansas	L 57–72	12–10 (3–7)	Allen Fieldhouse (11,500); Lawrence, Kansas
February 25, 1974; 7:35 pm, WOI (delay)		Colorado	W 69–61	13–10 (4–7)	Hilton Coliseum (6,200); Ames, Iowa
March 4, 1974; 7:35 pm		at Oklahoma State	W 70–68	14–10 (5–7)	Gallagher Hall (2,600); Stillwater, Oklahoma
March 6, 1974; 7:35 pm		at Oklahoma	L 70–88	14–11 (5–8)	OU Field House (3,600); Norman, Oklahoma
March 9, 1974; 1:00 pm, TVS – Big Eight		Nebraska	W 76–58	15–11 (6–8)	Hilton Coliseum (7,100); Ames, Iowa
*Non-conference game. ^{#}Rankings from AP poll. (#) Tournament seedings in parentheses. All times are in Central Time.
