= 1970–71 Iowa State Cyclones men's basketball team =

American college basketball season

1970–71 Iowa State Cyclones men's basketball
- Conference: Big Eight Conference
- Record: 5–21 (2–12 Big Eight)
- Head coach: Glen Anderson (12th season)
- Assistant coaches: Don Kelley; Arnie Gaarde
- Home arena: Iowa State Armory

The 1970–71 Iowa State Cyclones men's basketball team represented Iowa State University during the 1970–71 NCAA Division I men's basketball season. The Cyclones were coached by Glen Anderson, who was in his twelfth and final season with the Cyclones. They played their home games at the Iowa State Armory in Ames, Iowa for the final season. Anderson was replaced as head coach by Maury John, and the Armory was replaced with Hilton Coliseum.

They finished the season 5–21, 2–12 in Big Eight play to finish in a tie for seventh place.

1970–71 Big Eight Conference men's basketball standings
| | Conf. | | | | Overall |
| Team | W | | L | PCT | W | | L | PCT |
|---|---|---|---|---|---|---|---|---|
| No. 4 Kansas | 14 | – | 0 | 1.000 | 27 | – | 3 | .900 |
| Oklahoma | 9 | – | 5 | .643 | 19 | – | 8 | .704 |
| Missouri | 9 | – | 5 | .643 | 17 | – | 9 | .654 |
| Nebraska | 8 | – | 6 | .571 | 18 | – | 8 | .692 |
| Colorado | 6 | – | 8 | .429 | 14 | – | 12 | .538 |
| Kansas State | 6 | – | 8 | .429 | 11 | – | 15 | .423 |
| Oklahoma State | 2 | – | 12 | .143 | 7 | – | 19 | .269 |
| Iowa State | 2 | – | 12 | .143 | 5 | – | 21 | .192 |
Rankings from AP Poll

== Roster ==
1970–71 Iowa State Cyclones men's basketball team
Players
Coaches

| Pos. | # | Name | Height | Weight | Year | Hometown |
|---|---|---|---|---|---|---|
| F | | Gregg Barcus | 6 ft 7 in (2.01 m) | — | So |
| F | | Sam Brown | 6 ft 6 in (1.98 m) | — |
| G | | Jack DeVilder (C) | 6 ft 3 in (1.91 m) | — | Sr |
| F | | Rick Engel | 6 ft 4 in (1.93 m) | — | Jr |
| F | | Larry Gibson | 6 ft 6 in (1.98 m) | — |
| F | | Garth Johnson | 6 ft 5 in (1.96 m) | — |
| | | Mike Kilmartin | — | — |
| G | | Gene Mack | 6 ft 1 in (1.85 m) | — | Jr |
| G | | Jim Miller | 5 ft 9 in (1.75 m) | — | Jr |
| F | | Bob Moser | 6 ft 5 in (1.96 m) | — |
| F | | Jim Reinebach | 6 ft 6 in (1.98 m) | — | So |
| | | Robbie Robinson | — | — | So |
| | | John Skoog | — | — |
| G | | Bill Snell | 6 ft 0 in (1.83 m) | — | So |

Head coach

- Glen Anderson

Assistant coach(es)

Don Kelley
Arnie Gaarde

Legend

- (C) Team captain
- (S) Suspended
- (I) Ineligible
- (W) Walk-on
- Injured
- Current redshirt

== Schedule and results ==
| Date time, TV | Rank^{#} | Opponent^{#} | Result | Record | Site city, state |
Regular season
| December 1, 1970*; 7:35 pm | | Mankato State | W 85–72 | 1–0 | Iowa State Armory (6,850); Ames, Iowa |
| December 5, 1970*; 7:30 pm | | at Minnesota | L 69–89 | 1–1 | Williams Arena; Minneapolis |
| December 8, 1970*; 7:35 pm | | No. 7 Drake; Iowa Big Four | L 63–87 | 1–2 | Iowa State Armory; Ames, Iowa |
| December 12, 1970*; 7:35 pm | | Illinois | L 63–78 | 1–3 | Iowa State Armory (6,000); Ames, Iowa |
| December 14, 1970*; 7:35 pm | | Arkansas | W 86–77 | 2–3 | Iowa State Armory; Ames, Iowa |
| December 18, 1970*; 9:15 pm | | at Marshall; Marshall Tournament First round | L 66–90 | 2–4 | Veterans Memorial Fieldhouse; Huntington, West Virginia |
| December 19, 1970*; 6:00 pm | | vs. Holy Cross; Marshall Tournament Consolation | L 64–80 | 2–5 | Veterans Memorial Fieldhouse; Huntington, West Virginia |
| December 23, 1970*; 7:30 pm | | at Iowa; CyHawk Rivalry | L 68–87 | 2–6 | Iowa Fieldhouse; Iowa City, Iowa |
| December 26, 1970*; 7:00 pm | | vs. Oklahoma; Big Eight Holiday Tournament First round | W 74–71 | 3–6 | Municipal Auditorium (10,000); Kansas City, Missouri |
| December 29, 1970*; 7:00 pm | | vs. No. 12 Kansas; Big Eight Holiday Tournament Semifinals | L 56–59 ^{OT} | 3–7 | Municipal Auditorium (10,500); Kansas City, Missouri |
| December 29, 1970*; 3:00 pm | | vs. Colorado; Big Eight Holiday Tournament Third Place | L 64–70 | 3–8 | Municipal Auditorium; Kansas City, Missouri |
| January 4, 1971*; 7:30 pm | | at Northern Illinois | L 95–97 ^{2OT} | 3–9 | Chick Evans Field House; DeKalb, Illinois |
| January 9, 1971; 2:10 pm, Big Eight | | Oklahoma State | W 75–63 | 4–9 (1–0) | Iowa State Armory; Ames, Iowa |
| January 11, 1971; 7:35 pm, WOI (delay) | | Missouri | L 71–77 | 4–10 (1–1) | Iowa State Armory; Ames, Iowa |
| January 16, 1971; 7:35 pm | | at Nebraska | L 62–84 | 4–11 (1–2) | Nebraska Coliseum; Lincoln, Nebraska |
| January 18, 1971; 8:05 pm | | at No. 7 Kansas | L 57–83 | 4–12 (1–3) | Allen Fieldhouse; Lawrence, Kansas |
| January 23, 1971; 2:00 pm, Big Eight | | at Colorado | L 82–95 | 4–13 (1–4) | Balch Fieldhouse; Boulder, Colorado |
| January 30, 1971; 7:35 pm, WOI (delay) | | No. 6 Kansas | L 72–95 | 4–14 (1–5) | Iowa State Armory; Ames, Iowa |
| February 6, 1971; 7:35 pm | | at Kansas State | L 81–96 | 4–15 (1–6) | Ahearn Fieldhouse; Manhattan, Kansas |
| February 9, 1971; 7:35 pm, WOI (delay) | | Nebraska | L 67–69 ^{OT} | 4–16 (1–7) | Iowa State Armory; Ames, Iowa |
| February 13, 1971; 7:35 pm, WOI (delay) | | Kansas State | W 89–66 | 5–16 (2–7) | Iowa State Armory; Ames, Iowa |
| February 15, 1971; 7:30 pm | | at Missouri | L 66–80 | 5–17 (2–8) | Brewer Fieldhouse; Columbia, Missouri |
| February 20, 1971; 7:35 pm, WOI (delay) | | Oklahoma | L 72–86 | 5–18 (2–9) | Iowa State Armory (5,000); Ames, Iowa |
| March 3, 1971; 7:30 pm | | at Oklahoma | L 88–95 | 5–19 (2–10) | OU Field House; Norman, Oklahoma |
| March 5, 1971; 7:30 pm | | at Oklahoma State | L 63–69 | 5–20 (2–11) | Gallagher Hall; Stillwater, Oklahoma |
| March 8, 1971; 7:30 pm, WOI (delay) | | Colorado | L 73–77 | 5–21 (2–12) | Iowa State Armory; Ames, Iowa |
*Non-conference game. ^{#}Rankings from AP poll. (#) Tournament seedings in parentheses. All times are in Central Time.
