= Willie McCarter =

American basketball player (1946–2023)

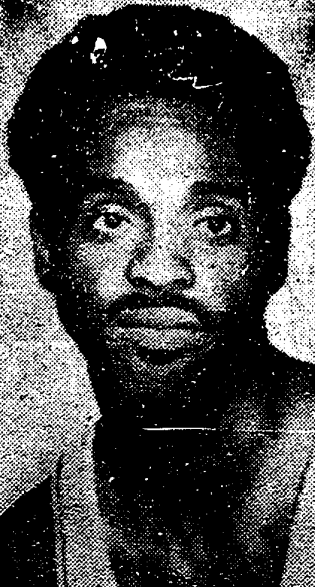
- McCarter in 1971

Personal information
- Born: July 26, 1946 Gary, Indiana, U.S.
- Died: April 18, 2023 (aged 76) Jackson, Michigan, U.S.
- Listed height: 6 ft 3 in (1.91 m)
- Listed weight: 175 lb (79 kg)

Career information
- High school: Theodore Roosevelt (Gary, Indiana)
- College: Drake (1966–1969)
- NBA draft: 1969: 1st round, 12th overall pick
- Drafted by: Los Angeles Lakers
- Playing career: 1969–1973
- Position: Shooting guard
- Number: 15, 17

Career history

Playing
- 1969–1971: Los Angeles Lakers
- 1971–1972: Portland Trail Blazers
- 1973: Grand Rapids Tackers

Coaching
- 1979–1982: Detroit

Career highlights
- 2× First-team All-MVC (1968, 1969); No. 15 retired by Drake Bulldogs

Career NBA statistics
- Points: 1,090 (7.0 ppg)
- Rebounds: 248 (1.6 rpg)
- Assists: 304 (2.0 apg)
- Stats at NBA.com
- Stats at Basketball Reference

Willie J. McCarter (July 26, 1946 – April 18, 2023) was an American basketball player. He was a 6-foot-3-inch (1.91 m), 175 lb (79 kg) guard. He played at Drake University, averaging 19.9 ppg in three seasons. He was drafted by the Los Angeles Lakers with the 12th pick in the 1969 NBA draft, and played three seasons with the Lakers and Portland Trail Blazers.

After his NBA career ended in 1972, he became the coach at Harper Creek High School in Battle Creek, Michigan. In January 1973, he signed to play with the Grand Rapids Tackers of the Continental Basketball Association, playing only when it did not conflict with his coaching. McCarter later served as head coach at the University of Detroit Mercy for three seasons from 1979 to 1982, replacing Smokey Gaines after Gaines was hired as the head basketball coach at San Diego State University.

On September 23, 2005, McCarter suffered the first of three strokes within nine months. With the help of his doctors, he recovered.

In February 2009, Drake University retired his No. 15 Bulldogs jersey.

McCarter's younger brother Andre also played in the NBA.

McCarter died in Jackson, Michigan, on April 18, 2023, at the age of 76. His lifelong friend and former teammate, Dolph Pulliam, was at McCarter's bedside when he died.

== Career playing statistics ==
Legend
GP	Games played	GS	Games started	MPG	Minutes per game
FG%	Field goal percentage	3P%	3-point field goal percentage	FT%	Free throw percentage
RPG	Rebounds per game	APG	Assists per game	SPG	Steals per game
BPG	Blocks per game	PPG	Points per game	**Bold**	Career high

=== NBA ===
==== Regular season ====
Year	Team	GP	MPG	FG%	FT%	RPG	APG	PPG
1969–70	L.A. Lakers	40	**21.5**	.378	**.717**	**2.1**	**2.3**	**7.7**
1970–71	L.A. Lakers	**76**	18.0	**.417**	.597	1.6	1.7	7.1
1971–72	Portland	39	15.7	.401	.673	1.1	2.2	6.2
Career		155	18.3	.402	.656	1.6	2.0	7.0

==== Playoffs ====
Year	Team	GP	MPG	FG%	FT%	RPG	APG	PPG
1970	L.A. Lakers	5	2.8	**.429**	**1.000**	.6	.6	1.4
1971	L.A. Lakers	**12**	**19.3**	.355	.167	**2.2**	**1.4**	**4.6**
Career		17	14.5	.361	.286	1.7	1.2	3.6

== Head coaching record ==
Record table
Season	Team	Overall	Conference	Standing	Postseason
**Detroit Mercy Titans** (Midwestern City Conference) (1979–1982)
1979–80	Detroit	14–13			
1980–81	Detroit	9–18	1–5	6th	
1981–82	Detroit	10–17	6–6	5th	
Detroit:		33–48 (.407)	7–11 (.389)		
Total:		33–48 (.407)			
National champion Postseason invitational champion Conference regular season champion Conference regular season and conference tournament champion Division regular season champion Division regular season and conference tournament champion Conference tournament champion
