= Cotton Fitzsimmons =

American basketball coach (1931–2004)

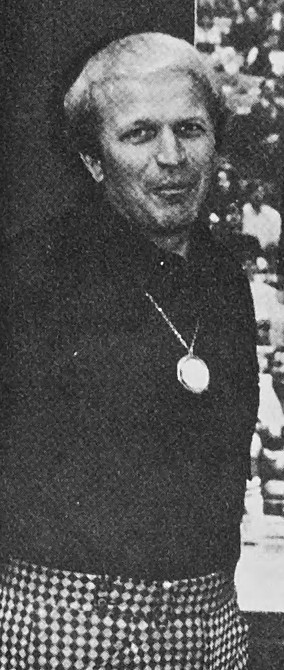
- Fitzsimmons in 1974

Personal information
- Born: October 7, 1931 Hannibal, Missouri, U.S.
- Died: July 24, 2004 (aged 72) Phoenix, Arizona, U.S.
- Listed height: 5 ft 7 in (1.70 m)
- Listed weight: 160 lb (73 kg)

Career information
- High school: Bowling Green (Bowling Green, Missouri)
- College: Hannibal–LaGrange (1952–1953); Midwestern State (1953–1956)
- Position: Shooting guard
- Coaching career: 1958–1992, 1996–1997

Career highlights
- 2× NBA Coach of the Year (1979, 1989); 2× NJCAA tournament champion (1966, 1967); Big Eight regular season champion (1970); Big Eight Coach of the Year (1970)

Career coaching record
- NBA: 832–775 (.518)
- Record at Basketball Reference
- Basketball Hall of Fame

Lowell Gibbs "Cotton" Fitzsimmons (October 7, 1931 – July 24, 2004) was an American college and NBA basketball coach. A native of Bowling Green, Missouri, he attended and played basketball at Hannibal-LaGrange Junior College in Hannibal, Missouri and Midwestern State University in Wichita Falls, Texas. He coached the Phoenix Suns three times, was named the NBA Coach of the Year twice, and is often credited as the architect of the Suns' success of the late 1980s and early to middle 1990s. Fitzsimmons won 1,089 games in his coaching career: 223 games at the junior college level, 34 at the Division I college level and 832 in the NBA.

On May 16, 2021, it was announced that Fitzsimmons was elected to the Naismith Basketball Hall of Fame. The Class of 2021 enshrinement ceremony occurred on September 11, 2021.

== Early life ==
Lowell Gibbs "Cotton" Fitzsimmons was born on October 7, 1931, in Hannibal, Missouri, to Clancy and Zelda Fitzsimmons. Fitzsimmons was raised in Bowling Green, Missouri, where he attended Bowling Green High School.

The family of six moved to Bowling Green when Lowell was young. There, his fourth grade classmates nicknamed him "Cotton" because of his hair. His father died when he was in fifth grade. His mother raised Cotton and three siblings.

In high school, Bowling Green High School basketball coach James A. Wilson became a key figure for Fitzsimmons. Fitzsimmons said: “Coach Wilson had the biggest influence on me of any male adult. He taught me the difference between rules and principles. Rules are made to be bent, sometimes even broken. Principles are something you live by. My mother raised me, of course, but I think I looked up to Coach Wilson as a father figure and wanted to be like him.”

With the 5'7" Fitzsimmons, Bowling Green High School twice advanced to the Missouri State High School Basketball Tournament.

After graduating from Bowling Green High School, Fitzsimmons worked at a brick plant in nearby Farber, Missouri. He worked for two years to help support the family until his sisters graduated from high school, just as his older brother Orland had done. During those two years, Cotton played 80 game seasons for the brickyard basketball team, was a basketball referee for local high school games and was a baseball infielder on a Bowling Green town baseball team, serving as the team manager. On his first taste of coaching, he recalled, "It's not easy going to the mound as a kid and taking out your pitcher, who's probably 30."

== College career ==
In 1952, Fitzsimmons enrolled at Hannibal-LaGrange College (HLG), then a junior college in Hannibal, Missouri. Fitzsimmons became a junior-college All-American, averaging 25.5 points a game at Hannibal-LaGrange (where his jersey is now retired). He led the team to the NJCAA Tournament.

Fitzsimmons left Missouri to attend Midwestern State University in Wichita Falls, Texas. There, he averaged 13.3 points over 82 games and scored a career 1,095 points, while helping the Mustangs to the NAIA Tournament quarterfinals in 1956. Fitzsimmons turned down an offer to play AAU basketball for the Akron Goodyear Wingfoots and remained at Midwestern State after graduation to earn a master's degree in administrative education. He decided his ambition was to become a professional basketball coach.

== Coaching career ==
=== Moberly Junior College (1958–1967) ===
After earning his degrees at Midwestern State, Fitzsimmons returned to Missouri. He accepted the position as head coach at Moberly Junior College in Moberly, Missouri in 1958, replacing Maury John. Fitzsimmons coached for nine seasons (1958–1967) at Moberly, with a record of 223–59 (.790). When asked in his interview how long he planned to stay at Moberly if hired, "“I gave him the dumbest answer I ever gave anyone,” he said, “I told him I’d be there till we won two titles in a row.” Fitzsimmons proceeded to finish his tenure at Moberly with back-to-back NJCAA National Championships, in 1966 and 1967.

=== Kansas State University (1967–1970) ===
Fitzsimmons was hired by Kansas State University, serving as an assistant coach in 1967–1968 under Head Coach Tex Winter. There he learned the Triangle Offense from Winter, who left after the season for Washington and recommended Fitzsimmons to replace him. In 1968, he was named Head Coach at Kansas State. Fitzsimmons' first team at KSU finished 14–12. In 1969–1970, The Wildcats went a surprising 20–8, capturing the Big 8 Conference Championship. He was named 1970 Big 8 Coach of the Year and led the Wildcats to the Sweet Sixteen of the 1970 NCAA tournament. Fitzsimmons then moved to the NBA with the Phoenix Suns.

=== Phoenix Suns (1970–1972) ===
In 1970, Fitzsimmons replaced Jerry Colangelo as head coach of the Phoenix Suns. It was Colangelo, serving as General Manager, who sought Fitzsimmons for the position. At first Colangelo had called Fitzsimmons and asked about other possible candidates. Eventually, Colangelo asked Fitzsimmons, “How would you like the job?” Fitzsimmons took the position and led the Suns to their first winning season, going 48–34 that season. The relationship between Colangelo and Fitzsimmons would be lengthy, as Fitzsimmons would serve the Suns in multiple capacities, including three tenures as head coach. Fitzsimmons worked with Colangelo without any discussion of compensation throughout their long tenure together.

=== Atlanta Hawks (1972–1976) ===
Fitzsimmons was released from the remaining two years of his Suns contract by Colangelo to allow him to accept a similar capacity with the Atlanta Hawks on May 31, 1972. He was 140–180 in four seasons, with one playoff appearance. He returned to Phoenix to reside in 1975, although he still coached the Hawks. According to Fitzsimmons, one of the main reasons he accepted a job as Hawks coach was the opportunity to coach Pete Maravich. The Hawks traded Maravich to the New Orleans Jazz in May 1974 and Fitzsimmons was left with a young team and a rotating front office.“Presidents and GMs were flying out of here like paper clips.” he told Sports Illustrated. With the Hawks at 28–46 and mired in a ten-game losing streak, he was fired and assistant coach Bumper Tormohlen was promoted to replace him on an interim basis on March 30, 1976.

=== Golden State Warriors (1976–1977) ===
On August 4, 1976, Fitzsimmons was hired as player personnel director for the Golden State Warriors, to replace the late Bob Feerick, working alongside Al Attles, who was Coach and General Manager. Attles said, 'I have a long-standing relation with Cotton and have always admired and respected him as a person, coach, and evaluator of talent," There, the team made a series of trades of veteran players to acquire future draft picks.

=== Buffalo Braves (1977–1978) ===
Fitzsimmons quickly returned to coaching, becoming head coach by the Buffalo Braves, hired by general manager Norm Sonju on August 5, 1977. His one season as Braves head coach (27–55) was the team's last in Buffalo. The franchise moved to become the San Diego Clippers. The Braves changed owners and the team was moved and rebranded and Fitzsimmons reflected of his tenure jokingly, “I think Buffalo got a raw deal as far as the NBA,” he said years later. “I enjoyed everything Buffalo. What I feel bad about is the franchise … I guess I’ve got to take credit for folding the franchise.”

=== Kansas City Kings (1978–1984) ===
After he was released from the remaining two years of his contract with the Braves, Fitzsimmons was appointed to a similar capacity with the Kansas City Kings on May 10, 1978. He succeeded assistant general manager Larry Staverman who also finished the Kings' 31–51 1977–78 campaign as its interim head coach. Fitzsimmons spent six seasons with the Kings, with a 248–244 record and four playoff appearances. He won the 1979 NBA Coach of the Year Award, as the Kings finished 48–34 after finishing 31–51 the previous season. In the 1981 playoffs the 6th seed, with a losing regular season record, the Kings knocked off the top-seeded Phoenix Suns and advanced to the Western Conference finals, where they lost to the Houston Rockets in five games. Prior to the 1983–1984 season, the Kansas City Kings were sold to a group in Sacramento, California and the franchise was in limbo with a pending move to Sacramento. The Kings qualified for the playoffs and Fitzsimmons resigned after the season.

=== San Antonio Spurs (1984–1986) ===
On May 9, 1984, Fitzsimmons left Kansas City to become head coach of the San Antonio Spurs. The Spurs were 76–88 in Fitzsimmons two seasons, qualifying for the playoffs both seasons. Fitzsimmons was fired by the Spurs on April 29, 1986.

=== Phoenix Suns (1986–1992, 1996–1997) ===
Colangelo and Fitzsimmons reunited in 1986, as Fitzsimmons returned to the Suns organization, joining Colangelo in the Suns' front office. He would later return to the bench as head coach of the Suns in 1988. He was one of the driving forces behind the trade that sent Larry Nance to the Cleveland Cavaliers for Kevin Johnson, Mark West and a future first-round draft pick (who was Dan Majerle). The Suns also drafted Steve Kerr in the second round in 1988.

Fitzsimmons was criticized both by Suns fans and basketball critics after the trade; Nance was very popular in Phoenix. But the Suns had come off a chaotic 1987–1988 season in which they won 28 games and lost 54, and the team had been shaken by a drug scandal. With the first round draft pick of 1988, the Suns chose Dan Majerle, and the franchise had a turn-around season, winning 55 games and losing 27 before advancing to the Western Conference's Finals that season, where they were swept by the Los Angeles Lakers.

During the 1988 Draft when Majerle was booed by the fans, Fitzsimmons publicly chastised them by saying, "You'll be sorry that you booed this young man."

In 1989, he won his second NBA Coach of the Year Award. Fitzsimmons inherited a team that had finished 28–54, and improved them to 55–27. The Suns defeated the Denver Nuggets (3–0) and Golden State Warriors (4–1) in the playoffs before being swept by the Lakers in the Western Conference Finals.

After another successful season, the Suns returned to the NBA playoffs in 1990. This time around, they returned the favor on the Lakers, beating them 4 games to 1 at the Western Conference's Semi-Finals, but once again, Fitzsimmons' team fell short at the NBA's Western Conference Finals, losing to the Portland Trail Blazers, 4 games to 2.

In 1991, the Suns lost to the Utah Jazz in the Western Conference Playoffs' first round, 3 games to 1. During the rest of the playoffs, Fitzsimmons served briefly as a color commentator for NBC, most notably, alongside Marv Albert for Game 4 of the Eastern Conference Finals between the Chicago Bulls and the Detroit Pistons. In 1992, Cotton Fitzsimmons became only the sixth coach in NBA history to reach 800 wins.

After losing to the Trail Blazers in that year's Western Conference Semifinals, 4 games to 1, Fitzsimmons retired as coach, to work as Suns senior executive vice-president. By then a long-time friend of Colangelo, he helped Colangelo decide to trade Jeff Hornacek, Andrew Lang and Tim Perry for Charles Barkley, while also helping with the decision of signing free agent Danny Ainge. He also did television commentary, joining Al McCoy for Suns broadcasts.

In 1996, Fitzsimmons became the Suns head coach for the third time, guiding the Suns to the NBA Playoffs, where they lost to the Spurs, 3 games to 1.

The 1996–97 Suns lost their first eight games, and Fitzsimmons resigned as head coach. With 832 wins and 775 losses, Fitzsimmons was the eighth winningest coach in NBA history. He has since slipped to number ten in the all-time winning list as an NBA coach.

== Personal life ==
Fitzsimmons was diagnosed with lung cancer later on in life. His family chose to keep his health status private. Months after being diagnosed with cancer, his condition worsened because of a brain stroke. He suffered two more brain strokes before it was finally revealed to the public that he was in serious condition at a local hospital. On July 25, 2004, the morning after his death, The Arizona Republic's sports section's headline read: "Brightest Sun Fitzsimmons dies." He would be honored throughout the rest of the 2004–05 Phoenix Suns season with the team wearing a white patch on their jersey representing him honoring his memory for the entire season. He was 72 years old.

"Cotton Fitzsimmons embodied all things that are great about life and the game of basketball," Suns chairman and CEO Jerry Colangelo said. "His energy, passion and upbeat approach to everything impacted those that he touched in a positive and meaningful way."

Fitzsimmons was survived by his wife JoAnn, and his son, Gary. Gary Fitzsimmons has had a lengthy career as a basketball assistant coach, scout and executive. He serves as vice president and assistant general manager of the Atlanta Hawks.

Mabel McCormick, a program supporter (her husband was the volunteer team doctor) who kept the scorebook and statistics for Fitzsimmons at Moberly Community College, lived to be over 100 years old. She said her relationship with Fitzsimmons was special. McCormick said that she played a role in recruiting Fitzsimmons to Moberly after having seen him play at Hannibal-LaGrange, saying she went to the board and recommended him, along with an influential sports writer from the area. "I was convinced he was the right person," she said. She said of their relationship afterwards, “During his days here, Cotton was like a member of my family. He is probably my favorite. Even after he left Moberly and ended up with professional basketball we kept in close contact with one another and he would come to Moberly to visit me.”

“You're not going to make me have a bad day. If there's oxygen on earth and I'm breathing, it's going to be a good day.” ― Fitzsimmons

== Honors and awards ==
- In 1966 and 1967, Fitzsimmons was selected as "Coach of the Tournament" at the NJCAA Men's Division I Basketball Championship.
- Fitzsimmons was named Big 8 Coach of the Year in 1970.
- Fitzsimmons was NBA Coach of the Year in 1979 & 1989.
- In 1981, Fitzsimmons was inducted into the Missouri Sports Hall of Fame.
- Fitzsimmons was inducted into the NJCAA Men's Basketball Coaches Association Hall of Fame in 1985.
- Fitzsimmons' jersey was retired by Hannibal-LaGrange University.
- In 1995, Fitzsimmons was selected as the "NAIA Alumnus of the Year."
- In 2004, Fitzsimmons was inducted into the Midwestern State University Hall of Honor.
- In both 2011 and 2012, Fitzsimmons was posthumously nominated for the Naismith Basketball Hall of Fame.
- In 2015, Fitzsimmons was inducted into the Arizona Sports Hall of Fame.
- The Phoenix Suns retired the Number "832." This was in honor of Fitzsimmons' number of NBA career victories.
- The "Fitzsimmons-John Arena," (built in 1998) is the arena at Moberly Area Community College. It is named for Fitzsimmons and his predecessor as coach at Moberly, Maurice John.
- The "Cotton Fitzsimmons Memorial Golf Tournament" is held annually at Moberly Area Community College.
- The Phoenix Suns' Ring of Honor inducted Fitzsimmons in 2005. His popularity was immense among Suns fans and in the organization. In October 2018 fans selected Fitzsimmons as "Coach" of the Suns' 50th Anniversary Team.
- Phoenix Suns Charities annually present The Spirit of Cotton Award, which began in 2006. The Spirit of Cotton Award is awarded to high school head basketball coaches, for both girls and boys teams.
- The "Cotton Fitzsimmons Mile Handicap," a weight for performance turf thoroughbred horse race at Phoenix's Turf Paradise, has been conducted since 2005. Family members and former Suns players present the trophy and participate in events around the Fitzsimmons Mile.

== Head coaching record ==
=== College ===
Record table
Season	Team	Overall	Conference	Standing	Postseason
Kansas State Wildcats (Big Eight Conference) (1968–1970)
1968–69	Kansas State	14–12	9–5	T–2nd	
1969–70	Kansas State	20–8	10–4	1st	NCAA Division I Sweet 16
Kansas State:		34–20 (.630)	19–9 (.679)		
Total:		34–20 (.630)			
National champion Postseason invitational champion Conference regular season champion Conference regular season and conference tournament champion Division regular season champion Division regular season and conference tournament champion Conference tournament champion

=== NBA ===
Legend
Regular season	G	Games coached	W	Games won	L	Games lost	W–L %	Win–loss %
Playoffs	PG	Playoff games	PW	Playoff wins	PL	Playoff losses	PW–L %	Playoff win–loss %

Team	Year	G	W	L	W–L%	Finish	PG	PW	PL	PW–L%	Result
Phoenix	1970–71	82	48	34	.585	3rd in Midwest	—	—	—	—	Missed playoffs
Phoenix	1971–72	82	49	33	.598	3rd in Midwest	—	—	—	—	Missed playoffs
Atlanta	1972–73	82	46	36	.561	2nd in Central	6	2	4	.333	Lost in Conf. Semifinals
Atlanta	1973–74	82	35	47	.427	2nd in Central	—	—	—	—	Missed playoffs
Atlanta	1974–75	82	31	51	.378	2nd in Central	—	—	—	—	Missed playoffs
Atlanta	1975–76	74	28	46	.378	(fired)	—	—	—	—	–
Buffalo	1977–78	82	27	55	.329	4th in Atlantic	—	—	—	—	Missed playoffs
Kansas City	1978–79	82	48	34	.585	1st in Midwest	5	1	4	.200	Lost in Conf. Semifinals
Kansas City	1979–80	82	47	35	.573	2nd in Midwest	3	1	2	.333	Lost in first round
Kansas City	1980–81	82	40	42	.488	2nd in Midwest	15	7	8	.467	Lost in Conf. Finals
Kansas City	1981–82	82	30	52	.366	4th in Midwest	—	—	—	—	Missed playoffs
Kansas City	1982–83	82	45	37	.549	3rd in Midwest	—	—	—	—	Missed playoffs
Kansas City	1983–84	82	38	44	.463	4th in Midwest	3	0	3	.000	Lost in first round
San Antonio	1984–85	82	41	41	.500	5th in Midwest	5	2	3	.400	Lost in first round
San Antonio	1985–86	82	35	47	.427	6th in Midwest	3	0	3	.000	Lost in first round
Phoenix	1988–89	82	55	27	.671	2nd in Pacific	12	7	5	.583	Lost in Conf. Finals
Phoenix	1989–90	82	54	28	.659	3rd in Pacific	16	9	7	.563	Lost in Conf. Finals
Phoenix	1990–91	82	55	27	.671	3rd in Pacific	4	1	3	.250	Lost in first round
Phoenix	1991–92	82	53	29	.646	3rd in Pacific	8	4	4	.333	Lost in Conf. Semifinals
Phoenix	1995–96	49	27	22	.551	4th in Pacific	4	1	3	.250	Lost in first round
Phoenix	1996–97	8	0	8	.000	(resigned)	—	—	—	—	–
Career		1,607	832	775	.518		84	35	49	.417	
