= 1970–71 Drake Bulldogs men's basketball team =

American college basketball season

1970–71 Drake Bulldogs men's basketball

Missouri Valley Conference Champions

NCAA tournament, Elite Eight
- Conference: Missouri Valley Conference

Ranking
- Coaches: No. 16
- AP: No. 18
- Record: 21–8 (9–5 MVC)
- Head coach: Maury John (13th season)
- Assistant coaches: Dan Callahan; Gus Guydon
- Home arena: Veterans Memorial Auditorium

1970–71 Missouri Valley Conference men's basketball standings
	Conf.				Overall
Team	W		L	PCT	W		L	PCT
No. 18 Drake	9	–	5	.643	21	–	8	.724
Louisville	9	–	5	.643	20	–	9	.690
Saint Louis	9	–	5	.643	17	–	12	.586
Memphis State	8	–	6	.571	18	–	8	.692
Tulsa	8	–	6	.571	17	–	9	.654
Bradley	6	–	8	.429	13	–	12	.520
North Texas State	4	–	10	.286	10	–	15	.400
Wichita State	3	–	11	.214	10	–	16	.385
West Texas State		–		–	19	–	7	.731
New Mexico State		–		–	19	–	8	.704
Rankings from AP Poll

The 1970–71 Drake Bulldogs men's basketball team represented Drake University as a member of the Missouri Valley Conference during the 1970–71 NCAA University Division men's basketball season. The team was led by 13th-year head coach Maury John and played their home games at Veterans Memorial Auditorium in Des Moines, Iowa. The Bulldogs were 9–5 in Missouri Valley Conference play, finishing in a 3-way tie for the league title.

Drake received a bid to the NCAA tournament where they defeated Notre Dame in the regional semifinal. The Bulldogs would fall one game short of the Final Four in back-to-back seasons, losing to Kansas in the regional final, 73–71.

This season marked the end of a streak – the only time in program history the Bulldogs reached the NCAA tournament in three consecutive seasons (reaching the Elite Eight all three times) – and the end of an era, as head coach Maury John left to become head coach at Iowa State.

== Previous season ==
The Bulldogs reached the NCAA tournament for the second straight season, advancing to the Elite Eight a season after making the program's only Final Four appearance in 1969. Drake completed the season with a 22–7 record (14–2 Missouri Valley) and were ranked number 9 in the final AP poll.

== Roster ==
1970–71 Drake Bulldogs men's basketball team
Players
Coaches

Pos.	#	Name	Height	Weight	Year	Hometown
F	5	Dale Gordon	6 ft 7 in (2.01 m)	205 lb (93 kg)	Jr	Creston, Iowa
C	23	Tom Bush	6 ft 8 in (2.03 m)	210 lb (95 kg)	Sr	Chicago, Illinois
G/F	42	Jeff Halliburton	6 ft 5 in (1.96 m)	190 lb (86 kg)	Sr	Rockville Centre, New York

Head coach

- Maury John

Assistant coach(es)

Legend

- (C) Team captain
- (S) Suspended
- (I) Ineligible
- (W) Walk-on
- Injured
- Current redshirt

== Schedule and results ==
Date time, TV	Rank^{#}	Opponent^{#}	Result	Record	Site city, state
Non-conference regular season
Dec 1, 1970*	No. 10	Wisconsin-Platteville	W 107–73	1–0	Veterans Memorial Auditorium; Des Moines, Iowa
Dec 1, 1970*	No. 10	Cal State Fullerton	W 101–57	2–0	Veterans Memorial Auditorium; Des Moines, Iowa
Dec 8, 1970*	No. 7	at Iowa State; Iowa Big Four	W 87–63	3–0	Iowa State Armory; Ames, Iowa
Dec 12, 1970*	No. 7	Iowa; Iowa Big Four	W 72–70	4–0	Veterans Memorial Auditorium; Des Moines, Iowa
Dec 18, 1970*	No. 9	vs. Texas–Arlington; Texas Classic	W 102–83	5–0	Daniel-Meyer Coliseum; Fort Worth, Texas
Dec 19, 1970*	No. 9	at TCU; Texas Classic	W 79–78	6–0	Daniel-Meyer Coliseum; Fort Worth, Texas
Dec 22, 1970*	No. 9	Minnesota	W 83–66	7–0	Veterans Memorial Auditorium; Des Moines, Iowa
Dec 26, 1970*	No. 9	at Canisius; Queen City Classic	W 87–74	8–0	Buffalo Memorial Auditorium; Buffalo, New York
Dec 28, 1970*	No. 7	vs. Niagara; Queen City Classic	L 77–87	8–1	Buffalo Memorial Auditorium; Buffalo, New York
Jan 2, 1971*	No. 7	at Cincinnati	L 59–60	8–2	Armory Fieldhouse; Cincinnati, Ohio
Missouri Valley Conference regular season
Jan 7, 1971	No. 16	at Wichita State	W 78–74	9–2 (1–0)	Levitt Arena; Wichita, Kansas
Jan 9, 1971*	No. 16	Tulsa	L 60–66	9–3 (1–1)	Veterans Memorial Auditorium; Des Moines, Iowa
Jan 13, 1971		at Bradley	L 85–88	9–4 (1–2)	Robertson Memorial Field House; Peoria, Illinois
Jan 20, 1971*		UMKC	W 130–73	10–4	Veterans Memorial Auditorium; Des Moines, Iowa
Jan 23, 1971		Louisville	W 81–78	11–4 (2–2)	Veterans Memorial Auditorium; Des Moines, Iowa
Jan 28, 1971		North Texas	W 90–66	12–4 (3–2)	Veterans Memorial Auditorium; Des Moines, Iowa
Jan 30, 1971*		Memphis State	W 93–70	13–4 (4–2)	Veterans Memorial Auditorium; Des Moines, Iowa
Feb 2, 1971*		DePaul	W 93–80	14–4	Veterans Memorial Auditorium; Des Moines, Iowa
Feb 4, 1971		at Memphis State	L 72–73	14–5 (4–3)	Mid-South Coliseum; Memphis, Tennessee
Feb 11, 1971		Bradley	W 113–78	15–5 (5–3)	Veterans Memorial Auditorium; Des Moines, Iowa
Feb 13, 1971		at Saint Louis	L 62–64	15–6 (5–4)	St. Louis Arena; St. Louis, Missouri
Feb 17, 1971		at No. 19 Louisville	L 52–94	15–7 (5–5)	Freedom Hall; Louisville, Kentucky
Feb 20, 1971		at Tulsa	W 87–84	16–7 (6–5)	Expo Square Pavilion; Tulsa, Oklahoma
Feb 23, 1971		Wichita State	W 83–76	17–7 (7–5)	Veterans Memorial Auditorium; Des Moines, Iowa
Feb 27, 1971		Saint Louis	W 89–85	18–7 (8–5)	Veterans Memorial Auditorium; Des Moines, Iowa
Mar 2, 1971		at North Texas	W 65–60	19–7 (9–5)	North Texas Men's Gym; Denton, Texas
NCAA tournament
Mar 18, 1971*	No. 18	vs. No. 12 Notre Dame; Midwest Regional Semifinal	W 79–72 ^{OT}	21–7	Levitt Arena; Wichita, Kansas
Mar 20, 1971*	No. 18	vs. No. 4 Kansas; Midwest Regional Final	L 71–73	21–8	Levitt Arena; Wichita, Kansas
*Non-conference game. ^{#}Rankings from AP Poll. (#) Tournament seedings in parentheses. MW=Midwest. All times are in Central Time.
