= Ted Payseur =

American basketball player, coach, and athletic director

Biographical details
- Born: December 31, 1901; Wilmington, North Carolina, U.S.
- Died: June 1982 (age 80); Cedar Rapids, Iowa, U.S.

Administrative career (AD unless noted)
- 1945–1956: Northwestern

Theodore Barton Payseur (December 31, 1901 – June 1982) was an American basketball player and coach and athletic director. He attended Drake University, where he was a member of the basketball and golf teams. He was the leading scorer in basketball in the Missouri Valley Conference for two years. He graduated from Drake in 1922 and worked as a football, basketball and track coach at Dubuque High School from 1923 to 1926. He was hired by Northwestern University in 1926 and over the next 19 years held positions as freshman basketball coach, intramural director, business manager and assistant basketball coach. In 1945, he was hired as Northwestern's athletic director, a position he held until 1956. In 2005, he was inducted into The Des Moines Register Iowa Sports Hall of Fame.
