= 1970–71 Kansas Jayhawks men's basketball team =

American college basketball season

1970–71 Kansas Jayhawks men's basketball

Big Eight Champions

NCAA tournament, Final Four
- Conference: Big Eight Conference

Ranking
- Coaches: No. 4
- AP: No. 4
- Record: 27–3 (14–0 Big 8)
- Head coach: Ted Owens (7th season)
- Assistant coaches: Gale Catlett (4th season); Sam Miranda (5th season)
- Captain: Pierre Russell
- Home arena: Allen Fieldhouse

1970–71 Big Eight Conference men's basketball standings
	Conf.				Overall
Team	W		L	PCT	W		L	PCT
No. 4 Kansas	14	–	0	1.000	27	–	3	.900
Oklahoma	9	–	5	.643	19	–	8	.704
Missouri	9	–	5	.643	17	–	9	.654
Nebraska	8	–	6	.571	18	–	8	.692
Colorado	6	–	8	.429	14	–	12	.538
Kansas State	6	–	8	.429	11	–	15	.423
Oklahoma State	2	–	12	.143	7	–	19	.269
Iowa State	2	–	12	.143	5	–	21	.192
Rankings from AP Poll

The 1970–71 Kansas Jayhawks men's basketball team represented the University of Kansas during the 1970–71 college men's basketball season.

== Roster ==
- Dave Robisch
- Bud Stallworth
- Roger Brown
- Pierre Russell
- Aubrey Nash
- Mark Williams
- Bob Kivisto
- Randy Canfield
- Greg Douglas
- Mark Mathews
- Jerry House
- Neal Mask

== Schedule ==
Date time, TV	Rank^{#}	Opponent^{#}	Result	Record	Site city, state
December 1*	No. 14	No. 18 Long Beach State	W 69–52	1-0	Allen Fieldhouse; Lawrence, KS
December 5*	No. 14	Eastern Kentucky	W 79–65	2-0	Allen Fieldhouse; Lawrence, KS
December 7*	No. 14	South Dakota State	W 95–59	3-0	Allen Fieldhouse; Lawrence, KS
December 12*	No. 11	Loyola (IL)	W 94–62	4-0	Allen Fieldhouse; Lawrence, KS
December 18*	No. 12	Saint Joseph's	W 80–65	5-0	Allen Fieldhouse; Lawrence, KS
December 19*	No. 12	Houston	W 89–73	6-0	Allen Fieldhouse; Lawrence, KS
December 21*	No. 12	at Louisville	L 75–87	6-1	Freedom Hall; Louisville, KY
December 26	No. 8	vs. Missouri; Border War	W 96–63	7-1	Municipal Auditorium; Kansas City, MO
December 29	No. 12	vs. Iowa State	W 59–56	8-1	Municipal Auditorium; Kansas City, MO
December 30	No. 12	vs. Nebraska	W 72–52	9-1	Municipal Auditorium; Kansas City, MO
January 12*	No. 8	at Georgia Tech	W 84–71	10-1	Alexander Memorial Coliseum; Atlanta, GA
January 16*	No. 8	Oklahoma City	W 101–77	11-1	Allen Fieldhouse; Lawrence, KS
January 18	No. 8	Iowa State	W 83–57	12-1 (1-0)	Allen Fieldhouse; Lawrence, KS
January 23	No. 5	Oklahoma State	W 90–55	13-1 (2-0)	Allen Fieldhouse; Lawrence, KS
January 30	No. 5	at Iowa State	W 95–72	14-1 (3-0)	James H. Hilton Coliseum; Ames, IA
February 1	No. 5	Kansas State; Sunflower Showdown	W 79–74	15-1 (4-0)	Allen Fieldhouse; Lawrence, KS
February 6	No. 5	at Nebraska	W 81–67	16-1 (5-0)	Nebraska Coliseum; Lincoln, NE
February 8	No. 5	Colorado	W 91–67	17-1 (6-0)	Allen Fieldhouse; Lawrence, KS
February 13	No. 5	at Oklahoma State	W 63–50	18-1 (7-0)	Gallagher-Iba Arena; Stillwater, OK
February 15	No. 5	at Oklahoma	W 71–68	19-1 (8-0)	McCasland Field House; Norman, OK
February 20	No. 5	Missouri; Border War	W 85–66	20-1 (9-0)	Allen Fieldhouse; Lawrence, KS
February 23	No. 5	at Kansas State; Sunflower Showdown	W 61–48	21-1 (10-0)	Ahearn Field House; Manhattan, KS
February 27	No. 5	at Colorado	W 66–65	22-1 (11-0)	Balch Fieldhouse; Boulder, CO
March 6	No. 4	Oklahoma	W 54–52 ^{OT}	23-1 (12-0)	Allen Fieldhouse; Lawrence, KS
March 8	No. 4	at Missouri; Border War	W 71–69	24-1 (13-0)	Brewer Fieldhouse; Columbia, MO
March 13	No. 5	Nebraska	W 59–54	25-1 (14-0)	Allen Fieldhouse; Lawrence, KS
March 18	No. 4	vs. No. 14 Houston; NCAA Midwest Regional semifinals	W 78–77	26-1	Levitt Arena; Wichita, KS
March 20	No. 4	vs. No. 18 Drake; Midwest Regional Finals	W 73–71	27-1	Levitt Arena; Wichita, KS
March 25	No. 4	vs. No. 1 UCLA; National semifinals	L 60–68	27-2	Astrodome; Houston, TX
March 27	No. 4	vs. No. 7 Western Kentucky; National third-place game	L 75–77	27-3	Astrodome; Houston, TX
*Non-conference game. ^{#}Rankings from AP Poll. (#) Tournament seedings in parentheses.
