= Jeffrey E. Jacobson =

Lawyer

Jeffrey E. Jacobson (originally from the Bronx, New York) is an American lawyer. Jacobson is a member of the Bars of the State of New York and District of Columbia. He is a notable lawyer within the entertainment and intellectual property fields.

== Education ==
Jacobson received a B.A. in philosophy from Fordham University in 1976, and his J.D. from New York Law School in 1980, where he won the ASCAP Nathan Burkan Memorial Competition for his article "Copyright and Fair Use: Considerations in Written Works." He was selected as a "Super Lawyer" in intellectual property for 12 years in a row, an honor that is reserved for the top 5% of attorneys in the New York Metropolitan area.

== Music ==
Prior to becoming an attorney Jacobson managed several music groups. The Squirrels in 1978 and The Leeves were among those. Jacobson also formed Squirrel Productions, Ltd. He was a consultant to a record company, Orange Records. Additionally, he served as President of the music publishing firm, Aldous Demian Enterprises, Ltd.

== Law ==
Upon graduating from law school, Jacobson worked for the performing rights organization SESAC, Inc. Then, from 1985 until 2010, he served as an attorney and managing partner at Jacobson & Colfin, P.C., where his clients included Mick Taylor from the Rolling Stones, Juan Luis Guerra, David Cassidy, and Marty Balin.

Jacobson is currently President of The Jacobson Firm, P.C., a law firm that specializes in trademarks, copyrights, intellectual property, and entertainment law. The firm works with individuals and corporations within the sports and entertainment industry, in addition to esports, creative and visual arts, video, music, jewelry, magazines, fashion, photography, multimedia, games, television and internet industries.

A few of his notable cases include Rupe v. Stanger (Dame Darcy)., Nester's Map & Guide Corp. v. Hagstrom Map Company. Where it was debated whether or not Nester's New York City taxi driver's guide Official New York Taxi Driver's Guide was entitled to copyright protections. The case served as an important precedent for future decisions. Additionally, Jacobson was responsible for securing a Temporary Restraining Order against Spike Lee's production company "30 Acres and a Mule" for the movie School Daze. Jacobson also appeared before the New York Supreme Court Appellate Court in Barbara Kemper p/k/a Barbara Powell V. Ralph J. Donofrio a/k/a Kash Monet, and Jonathan Holtzman and John Brielle, d/b/a Brielle Music. He also appeared before the Second Circuit Court of Appeals in The Video Trip Corporation v. Lightning Video, Inc.

Jacobson taught music business contracts for a decade at Five Towns College, and several years at the Institute of Audio Research. He is currently an adjunct associate professor at Hunter College and taught Advanced Music Business at Ramapo College of New Jersey. Additionally, he has guest lectured at the American Guild of Authors and Composers, the Songwriter's Guild, the Center for Media Arts, Fordham University, St. John's Law School, Pace University School of Law, the Detroit School of Law, Touro Law School, the American Federation of Musicians, New York Law School, the Mid-America Music Conference, The College Music Journal Conference, Philadelphia Music Conferences, and the Black Radio Exclusive Conference.

Jacobson has served on the New York City Bar Entertainment Law Committee, Trademark and Unfair Competition Committee, Copyright and Literary Property Law Committee, Media and Communications Law Committee, on several CLE faculties and their special N2K Task Force. He was also Chairman of the Broadcasting, Sound Recordings and Performing Artists Committee in the Intellectual Property Law section of the American Bar Association. He has also participated on various panels including the ABA Connection's "Seeking Harmony in Music Distribution." He currently serves on the Communications and Media Law Committee of the Association of the Bar of the City of New York.

In addition to serving as a Trustee for the Copyright Society of the United States of America, he serves on the editorial board for the Journal of the Copyright Society of the United States of America for nearly four decades beginning in 1989. Jacobson has also been a contributor and editor to many periodicals including the New York Law Journal, Fordham University Law School Entertainment Law Review, Show Business, St. John's Law Review, European Intellectual Property Review, Copyright World, Journal of the Copyright Society of the US, Music Management & International Promotion Magazine, The Nebula Music Magazine and CMJ New Music Report.

== Clients (Former and Present) ==
- Mick Taylor
- Juan Luis Guerra
- David Cassidy
- Marty Balin
- John Luongo
- John Kaizan Neptune
- Sly & Robbie
- Spyro Gyra
- Inner Circle
- Norton Records
- Freddie McGregor
- Israel Vibration
- Johnny Winter
- New Riders of the Purple Sage
- Masters at Work
- Laurel DeWitt
- Dame Darcy
- R.O.I.R. Records
- Vanesse Thomas/Segue
- VP Records
- Le Vian Corporation
- Judith Ripka Jewelry
- Buffalo Chip Campgrounds
- Esquire Bank
- The Jewelers Vigilance committee

== Publications ==
- Copyright and Fair Use: Considerations in Written Works
- Book Review: State Trademark & Unfair Competition Law by U.S. Trademark Association
- Jewelry Law Update
- Some Trademark Basics
- Music and Copyrights
- How to Avoid Getting Screwed in a Work-For-Hire Job—or How to Keep Your CopyRIGHTS
- Book Review: Copyright Law Deskbook by Robert W. Clarida
- Music and the Internet: Some Thoughts from a Copyright Perspective
- Producer's Agreements
- Indemnification Clauses
- How Record Companies Reduce Their Royalty Obligations
- Unraveling the Mystery Behind Record Royalties
- NARAS, NY Chapter Newsletter
- How to Register Your Copyright
- What Indemnification Clauses Mean to You
- Personal Compact Disc Copying
- Trademark Law Basics
- The Law of Copyright (Book Review)
- Copyright Principles, Law and Practice (Book Review)
- Trademarks & Copyright, Wizard: The Comics Magazine #43

== Professional Awards ==
- Martindale-Hubbell 25 Years of "Av Preeminent (R)"
- Super Lawyers 2014, 2015, 2016, 2017, 2018, 2019, 2020, 2021, 2022, 2023, 2024, 2025 NYC
- Av Rated
- NARAS Certificates of Appreciation, 2005, 2008
