= Jeff Jacobson (photographer) =

American photographer (1946–2020)

Jeff Jacobson (1946 – 9 August 2020) was a noted American color photographer born in Des Moines, Iowa in 1946. He began his career as a lawyer for the American Civil Liberties Union before devoting himself to photography after studying under Charles Harbutt. A member of Magnum Photos from 1978 to 1981, he subsequently was a partner of Archive Pictures and later affiliated with Redux Pictures.

== Photography career ==
His first collection of color photographs, My Fellow Americans ..., was published in 1991, and covered the years 1978-1989, documenting American society during the era of Ronald Reagan. During this period, his photographs were candids, and marked by visual jokes. He sabotaged the surface level of the subject matter in the frame by using strobe and fill-flash that hyperbolized the glitz of the composition, and gave the composition a disorienting blurriness. The title references Swiss photographer Robert Frank's work The Americans, with the cover image of Jacobson's father holding Jeff's son reminiscent of Frank's shot of a jet-black nanny cradling an ivory-white infant. His other stated and implicit influences include André Kertész, Charles Harbutt, Mark Rothko, Danny Lyons, Weegee, postmodernist Ralph Steadman, the Depression-era photojournalist Dorothea Lange, and Odilon Redon.

In 2006, Jacobson published Melting Point. These photographs present a more ethereal view of the world in transition, from 1990-2002. While most of these images were taken during his magazine assignments, they present a more lyrical, internal reaction to the events of the deaths of his parents, returning to live on the East coast, and the startling moment the Twin Towers burn behind a bronze statue depicting the horror of the Katyn Forest massacre.

In 2013, the book "The Last Roll" is released by Daylight Books. "The Last Roll" embodies the maturation of Jacobson's work, further abstracting his vision of the world, while his medium of Kodachrome film ceased production, shortly after he is diagnosed and treated for cancer. As he recovered his energy, his photographs are imbued with a new understanding of mortality. After viewing the world first from the windows of his home, he re-entered it again with fresh eyes, focussed now on the images that move him and give him strength.

He has also been published in The New York Times Magazine, The New Yorker, and other magazines, and numerous museums such as the Whitney Museum of American Art hold collections of his prints.

Jacobson died on 9 August 2020.

== Personal style ==
About his visual style, he wrote:

"A photograph can describe the world at a specific moment in time, yet contain a powerful ambiguity. This ambiguity comes from the meeting of the photographer's psyche with the world's reality. Whose truth is being presented in the photograph -- that of the photographer or that of the world?"

"We also tend to associate color in photographs with facts.... As a color photographer, my challenge is not to get stuck in the facts presented in the pictures. ... This requires abstraction. In black and white this abstraction is immediate, because the world exists in color. Color photographs require a different kind of abstraction. My challenge is to accentuate color without letting it so dominate my pictures that the subject matter of my photography becomes color itself. It's a delicate balancing act."
