= Rick Wanamaker =

American decathlete

Personal information
- Born: March 20, 1948 (age 78) Marengo, Iowa, U.S.
Medal record
Men's Athletics
Representing the United States
Pan American Games
Gold medal – first place	1971 Cali	Decathlon

Rick Wanamaker (born March 20, 1948) is an American track and basketball athlete who won the decathlon in the 1971 Pan American Games, and blocked a shot against Lew Alcindor in the 1969 NCAA national basketball semi-finals.

Rick Wanamaker attended Iowa Valley High School in Marengo, where he played basketball. He earned a scholarship and attended Drake University in Des Moines, Iowa, where he studied advertising. As a freshman, he wanted to participate in the Drake Relays, and chose the decathlon.

== Track and field ==
Wanamaker was a top ten U.S. decathlete from 1970 to 1974. He was the 1970 NCAA national champion and an All-American in decathlon, the 1971 AAU National Champion in decathlon, with a score of 7989, and was the 1971 gold medalist in decathlon at the Pan American Games with a score of 7648. He was injured prior to the 1972 Munich Olympic trials, and did not qualify for the 1972 Summer Olympics. He did defeat Mykola Avilov, the 1972 Olympic Champion, during the 1971 USA–USSR Track and Field Dual Meet Series, held in Berkeley, California and Bruce Jenner, the 1976 Olympic Champion, now known as Caitlyn Jenner, at the 1971 Drake Relays and 1971 National AAU Championships in Porterville, California. Wanamaker placed fifth at the 1970 Summer Universiade Men's decathlon in Turin, Italy.

Wanamaker is one of the tallest successful decathletes, at 6'-8", 210 lbs. in 1971.

He was the first high jumper, from the state of Iowa, to clear 7 feet, while competing in the 1970 Missouri Valley Conference Meet at Drake University. In 2007, he was named to the Missouri Valley Conference's All-Time Track and Field and Cross Country Teams.

Wanamaker finished second to Dick Fosbury, the 1968 Olympic high jump Champion, by 1 inch, at the 1969 Drake Relays.

A photograph of Rick Wanamaker running in the 1970 NCAA Championships at Drake University, taken by Jeff Jacobsen, was named the National Press Photographer’s Association best sports photo of the year.

== Basketball ==
Wanamaker was a member of the Drake Bulldogs basketball team that finished third in the 1969 NCAA basketball tournament after losing to UCLA in the finals and beating the University of North Carolina in the consolation round. He is best known for blocking a shot against Lew Alcindor (now Kareem Abdul-Jabbar) in the 1969 NCAA national semi-final game in Louisville.

Wanamaker's block of Alcindor's shot is one of the 100 top plays in NCAA tournament history, according to www.BleacherReport.com.

He was drafted by the Cleveland Cavaliers with the fourth pick in the 15th round of the 1970 NBA draft, but he did not pursue a career in professional basketball.
