= NJCAA Division I men's basketball championship =

NJCAA Division I Men's Basketball Championship
- Region: 24
- Teams: 221
- Current champions: Howard College (2026)
- Website: https://www.njcaa.org/sports/mbkb/index

NJCAA Men's Division I Basketball Championships is held annually in March at the Hutchinson Sports Arena in Hutchinson, KS. The first official NJCAA National Championship was in 1948 in Springfield, MO at the Southwest State College Fieldhouse. The event moved to "Hutch" in 1949, and has been there ever since. The format has changed many times throughout its history, and until 2013 it was a false double-elimination tournament. Now the event is single elimination and consists of 23 games over six days. The NJCAA had only one division for Men's Basketball until the 1986–87 season when Division 2 was added. A third non-scholarship division was formed starting with the 1990 tournament. The NJCAA is divided into 24 Regions who form 16 Districts. The 16 District Champions receive automatic berths in the National Championship, and there are eight at-large bids extended. This format has been in effect since the 2017 Championship. The results below are for Division 1 only.

List of Division 1 NJCAA Schools

Year	Winner	Runner up	Score	Ref.
1945	Pasadena City College	N/A	N/A	
1946	Sacramento Junior College	Pasadena City College	78–56	
1947	Compton College	Phoenix College	63–59 (OT)	
1948	College of Marin	Murray State School of Agriculture	48–34	
1949	Tyler Junior College	Hutchinson Community College	66–64	
1950	Los Angeles City College	Northeast Mississippi Junior College	67–63	
1951	Tyler Junior College	Ventura College	93–75	
1952	Wharton County Junior College	Hibbing Community College	78–76	
1953	El Dorado Junior College	Arkansas City Junior College	80–64	
1954	Moberly Area Community College	Snow College	54–49 (OT)	
1955	Moberly Area Community College	Hannibal-LaGrange College	71–64 (2 OT)	
1956	Kilgore College	Hannibal-LaGrange College	68–65	
1957	San Angelo College	Eastern Arizona College	63–51	
1958	Kilgore College	Weber College	68–57	
1959	Weber College	Bethany Lutheran College	57–47	
1960	Parsons Junior College	Tyler Junior College	73–71	
1961	Pueblo Junior College	Tyler Junior College	79–66	
1962	Coffeyville Community College	Lon Morris College	74–49	
1963	Independence Community College	Mercer County Community College	73–68 (OT)	
1964	Dodge City Community College	Casper College	73–68	
1965	Vincennes University	Burlington Junior College	80–76	
1966	Moberly Area Community College	Cameron State Agricultural College	90–66	
1967	Moberly Area Community College	San Jacinto College-Central	56–55	
1968	San Jacinto College-Central	Mercer County Community College	66–64	
1969	Paducah Community College	Robert Morris, Pa.	79–76	
1970	Vincennes University	Three Rivers Community College	85–67	
1971	Ellsworth College	College of Southern Idaho	80–71	
1972	Vincennes University	Ferrum College	73–61	
1973	Mercer County Community College	Hutchinson Community College (Vacated)	80–61	
1974	Mercer County Community College	Chipola Junior College	60–58	
1975	Western Texas Junior College	College of Southern Idaho	65–57	
1976	College of Southern Idaho	Mercer County Community College	62–50	
1977	Independence Community College	San Jacinto College-Central	75–72	
1978	Independence Community College	Niagara County Community College	62–61	
1979	Three Rivers Community College	Mercer County Community College	60–59 (OT)	
1980	Western Texas Junior College	Jefferson State Community College	85–72	
1981	Westark Community College	Lincoln College	67–50	
1982	Midland College	Miami Dade - North	93–88 (OT)	
1983	San Jacinto College-Central	Seminole State College	73–68	
1984	San Jacinto College-Central	Independence Community College	86–82	
1985	Dixie State College of Utah	Kankakee Community College	57–55	
1986	San Jacinto College-Central	Vincennes University	84–78	
1987	College of Southern Idaho	Midland College	69–68	
1988	Hutchinson Community College	Kankakee Community College	76–74	
1989	Northeastern Oklahoma A&M College	Northeast Mississippi Community College	83–76	
1990	Connors State College	College of Southern Idaho	103–87	
1991	Aquinas Junior College	Arizona Western College	74–68	
1992	Three Rivers Community College	Butler Community College	78–77	
1993	Pensacola Junior College	Butler Community College	79–74	
1994	Hutchinson Community College	Three Rivers Community College	78–74	
1995	Okaloosa-Walton College	Spartanburg Methodist College	79–63	
1996	Sullivan College	Allegany College of Maryland	104–98 (OT)	
1997	Indian Hills Community College	San Jacinto College-Central	89–80	
1998	Indian Hills Community College	Shelby State Community College	83–68	
1999	Indian Hills Community College	Barton County Community College	100–86	
2000	Southeastern Community College	Calhoun Community College	84–70	
2001	Wabash Valley College	Allegany College of Maryland	89–83	
2002	Dixie State College of Utah	Coffeyville Community College	82–81	
2003	Southeastern Community College	San Jacinto College-Central	76–68	
2004	Southeastern Community College	Redlands Community College	58–43	
2005	Paris Junior College	Moberly Area Community College	70–61	
2006	University of Arkansas - Fort Smith	Tallahassee Community College	68–59	
2007	Midland College	Chipola College	94–75	
2008	South Plains College	Salt Lake Community College	67–56	
2009	Salt Lake Community College	Midland College	67–60	
2010	Howard College	Three Rivers Community College	85–80	
2011	College of Southern Idaho	Midland College	72–64	
2012	South Plains College	Northwest Florida State College	81–68	
2013	College of Central Florida	Northwest Florida State College	74–69	
2014	Jones County Junior College	Indian Hills Community College	87–77	
2015	Northwest Florida State College	South Plains College	83–80	
2016	Salt Lake Community College	Hutchinson Community College	74–64	
2017	Hutchinson Community College	Eastern Florida State College	84–58	
2018	South Plains College	College of Southern Idaho	98–95	
2019	Vincennes University	Ranger College (TX)	87–77	
2020	Tournament cancelled	COVID-19 pandemic		
2021	Coffeyville Community College	Cowley Community College	108–99	
2022	Northwest Florida State College	Salt Lake Community College	83–67	
2023	John A. Logan College	Northwest Florida State College	73–70	
2024	Barton Community College	Triton College	88–73	
2025	Trinity Valley Community College	Connors State College	69–61	
2026	Howard College	College of Southern Idaho	82–67	

== Championship Leaders ==
Team	Championships	Winning year(s)
Vincennes University	4	1965, 1970, 1972, 2019
San Jacinto College-Central	4	1968, 1983, 1984, 1986
Moberly Area Community College	4	1954, 1955, 1966, 1967
Northwest Florida State College	3	1995, 2015, 2022
South Plains College	3	2008, 2012, 2018
Hutchinson Community College	3	1988, 1994, 2017
Indian Hills Community College	3	1997, 1998, 1999
Southeastern Community College	3	2000, 2003, 2004
Independence Community College	3	1963, 1977, 1978
College of Southern Idaho	3	1976, 1987, 2011
Tyler Junior College	2	1949, 1951
Kilgore College	2	1956, 1958
Mercer County Community College	2	1973, 1974
Midland College	2	1982, 2007
Dixie State College of Utah	2	1985, 2002
Three Rivers Community College	2	1979, 1992
Western Texas Junior College	2	1975, 1980
University of Arkansas - Fort Smith	2	1981, 2006
Salt Lake Community College	2	2009, 2016
Coffeyville Community College	2	1962, 2021
Howard College	2	2010, 2026

== See also ==
- NJCAA Men's Division II Basketball Championship
- NJCAA Men's Division III Basketball Championship
- NJCAA Women's Basketball Championship
