= Moberly Area Community College =

Public college in Moberly, Missouri, US

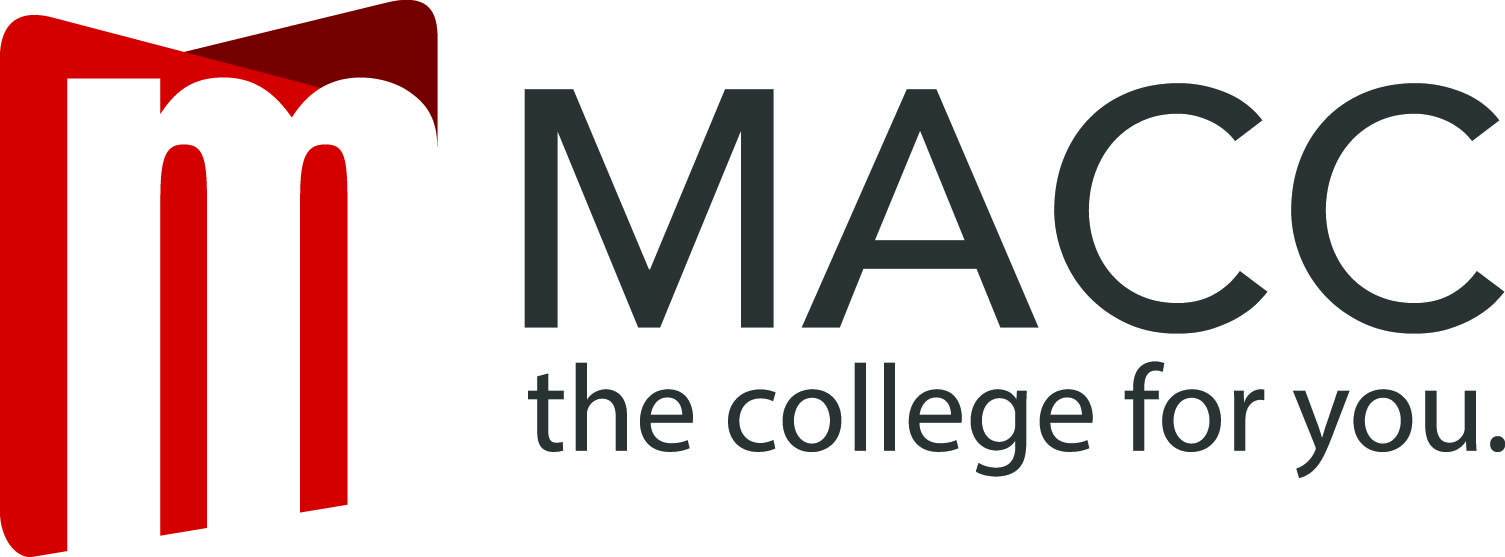
- Former name: Moberly Junior College
- Motto: The college for you.
- Type: Public community college
- Established: 1927
- President: Dr. Todd Martin
- Students: 5,600
- Location: Moberly, Missouri, United States; 39°25′07″N 92°27′18″W
- Colors: Red and Gray
- Sporting affiliations: National Junior College Athletic Association
- Mascot: Greyhound
- Website: macc.edu

Moberly Area Community College (MACC) is a public community college based in Moberly, Missouri. In addition to the Moberly campus, MACC has four auxiliary campuses in Columbia, Hannibal, Kirksville, and Mexico. The college is accredited by the Higher Learning Commission. In 2010, MACC enrollment was approximately 5,600 students.

== History ==
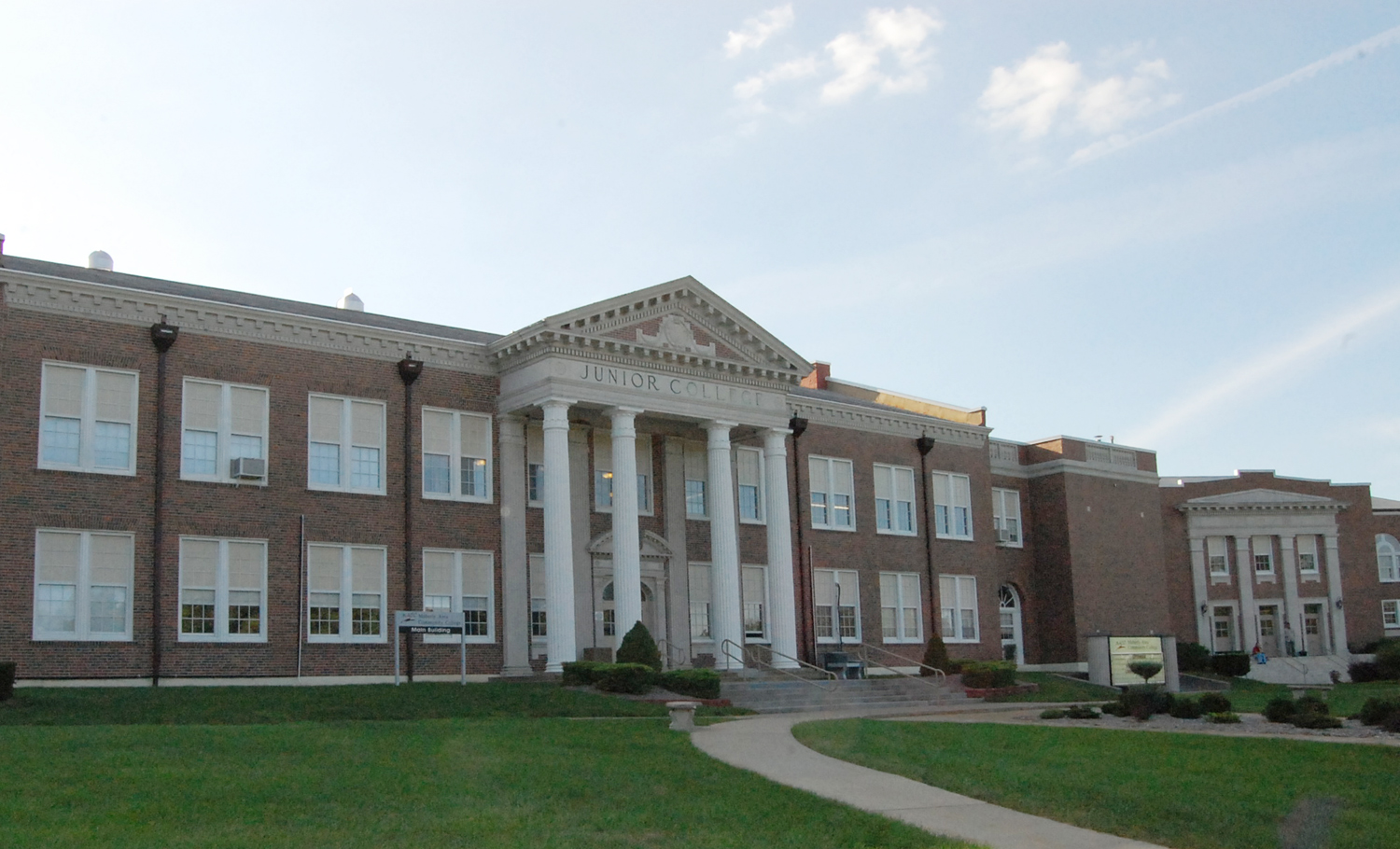
Original 1931 Moberly Junior College building

MACC was founded in 1927 as Moberly Junior College as a part of the Moberly Public School system. Temporary facilities housed the classes until 1931 when a permanent building was constructed on 29 acres, which would today be the current MACC campus. The college experienced rapid growth in the 1970s and 1980s, especially after a public vote led to the establishment of a community college district encompassing a 16-county area in northern and central Missouri. During this time, MACC gained accreditation from the North Central Association of Colleges and Schools. In 1990, the school was renamed Moberly Area Community College.

Major campus improvements include the $2.5 million fine arts wing constructed in 1984, providing a new library, classrooms, 600-seat auditorium, and student commons area. The Career Center was also expanded by nearly 22,000 square feet, allowing the consolidation of all vocational programs. College Hall, later renamed Komar Hall in honor of longtime MACC President Dr. Andrew Komar Jr., was built in 1993. The large three-story structure provided space for Administrative and business offices along with new chemistry, physics, and biology classrooms and labs. Fitzsimmons-Johns Arena, named for the two most successful basketball coaches in MACC history, Cotton Fitzsimmons and Maury John, is the home court for MACC Greyhounds men's and women's basketball as well as Missouri high school basketball playoff games and music concerts. One of the newest additions to the MACC-Moberly campus is the McCormick Commons and Residential Center, built in 2007. The 2,700-foot commons provides recreational activities, a computer lab, and laundry room while also serving as the main entry to the men's and women's dorms.

== Administration ==
The current President of MACC is Dr. Todd Martin. Dr. Jeffrey C. Lashley held the position from 2013 until her retirement in 2024. Lasley followed Dr. Evelyn E. Jorgenson. In November 2012, Jorgensen accepted a position as president of Northwest Arkansas Community College effective July 1, 2012. On December 11, 2012 the MACC Board of Trustees announced that Jeff Lashley, Ph.D would succeed Jorgenson as president effective July 1, 2013. Lashley had been on the MACC staff since 1996, first as an instructor, then as Dean of Academic Affairs, then as Vice-President for Instruction, and as president.

== Campus locations ==
Columbia, Missouri – MACC – Columbia, Missouri Campus

Hannibal, Missouri – MACC – Hannibal, Missouri Campus

Kirksville, Missouri – MACC – Kirksville, Missouri Campus

Mexico, Missouri – MACC – Mexico, Missouri Campus

Moberly, Missouri – MACC – Moberly, Missouri Campus

Online – MACC – Online/Virtual Campus

== Athletics ==
MACC offers men's and women's basketball, baseball and softball competing in the National Junior College Athletic Association (NJCAA) Division I, in the Missouri Community College Athletic Conference.

=== Men ===
The men's basketball team is one of the most victorious programs in junior college history, with four NJCAA Championships—in 1954, 1955, 1966, and 1967-three National runners-up, and four third-place finishes. Through the 2015–16 season, the Greyhounds have 27 national tournament appearances, which ranks second overall. The "Hounds" have recorded the most wins at the National Tournament, with 66. The four championships came under the direction of coaches Maury John (1946–1958) and Cotton Fitzsimmons (who coached at MACC from 1958 to 1967). Future Div I head coaches Charlie Spoonhour (1972–74), Dana Altman (1983–86) and Jay Spoonhour (2009–12) have led the Greyhounds.

The current men's basketball is Pat Smith, who has been coaching since 2012. His career record is 893–434. Men's baseball inaugural season took place in 2023. Head baseball coach is Chris Fletcher.

=== Women ===
The MACC women's basketball team won the NJCAA National Championship in 1982, and have made 13 national tournament appearances. The Lady Greyhounds have had 21 NJCAA All-American selections. 58 players have gone on to play at the NCAA Division 1 level. The current women's basketball head coach is Chevis Thompson. Women's fast pitch softball inaugural season was in 2023. The head coach is Matt Bauer.

=== Co-ed ===
The MACC esports team had its inaugural season in 2024.

== Notable alumni ==
- Martha Mears – singer on radio and in films in the 1930s and 1940s who dubbed singing voices for movie stars; graduated in Moberly Junior College's first class
- Mitch Richmond – National Basketball Association Rookie of the Year, six-time NBA All-Star
- Gerald Wilkins – 14-year NBA veteran (1985–1999); Knicks, Cavaliers, Grizzlies, Magic
- Qyntel Woods – former professional basketball player who played for the Trail Blazers, Heat, and the Knicks.
