= Dolph Pulliam =

American basketball player and sportscaster

Adolphus Pulliam
- Born: March 14, 1946; West Point, Mississippi, U.S.
- Education: Drake University (1965-1969)
- Occupations: Basketball player, broadcaster
- Spouse: Carol J. Weineke
- Parents: Aaron Pulliam (father); Beatrice Pulliam (mother)
- Relatives: Melvin Pulliam, Roosevelt Pulliam, Cora Bea Pulliam, Roger Lee Pulliam, James Pulliam, Joe Aaron Pulliam, Clara Pulliam, James Henry Pulliam (siblings)

Adolphus Pulliam (born March 14, 1946) is an American former basketball player and television sportscaster. He played collegiately at Drake University. He was named to Drake University's All-Century basketball team. He helped lead the Drake men's basketball team to the 1969 Final Four and a third-place finish. On 7 February 2009, Drake University retired Pulliam's #5 jersey that he wore for the Bulldogs. In 2019 he was inducted into the Missouri Valley Conference Hall of Fame.

Pulliam was born in West Point, Mississippi and grew up in Gary, Indiana. He had eight siblings, and at age 6 Dolph, his mother and siblings left Dolph's father. As a child he picked cotton in Oran, Missouri. His mother died on 24 October 1952, and while her death was officially ruled to be accidental carbon monoxide poisoning in a vehicle, Dolph was never satisfied by that conclusion. He was raised by his aunt and uncle after the death of his mother.

Pulliam attended Drake University with a four-year athletic scholarship, and graduated with a B.A. in Speech, and a minor in Radio/TV Broadcasting. He served as color analyst alongside Larry Cotlar on KRNT radio, the home of Drake Bulldogs basketball, and as director of Community Outreach and Development at Drake University. He was drafted by the Boston Celtics in the 6th round (80th overall) of the 1969 NBA draft. He was also drafted by the Dallas Cowboys in the NFL draft. Pulliam decided to take a job at Drake instead of becoming a professional athlete. He was the first African-American television broadcaster in the state of Iowa when he joined KRNT (later KCCI) television as a sportscaster. Pulliam retired from Drake University effective May 31, 2013, where he had worked in marketing.
