= List of Santa Monica College people =

This page lists the members of Santa Monica College, including students, alumni, faculty and academic affiliates associated.

== Alumni ==
=== Arts and entertainment ===
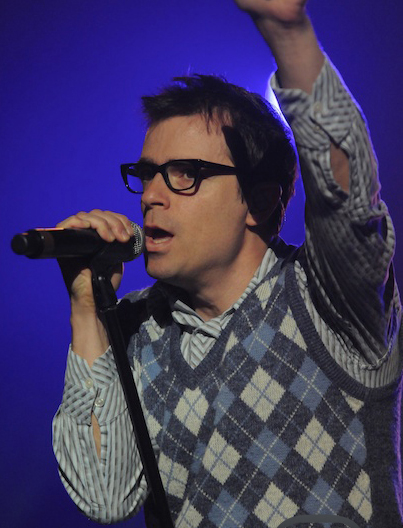
Rivers Cuomo

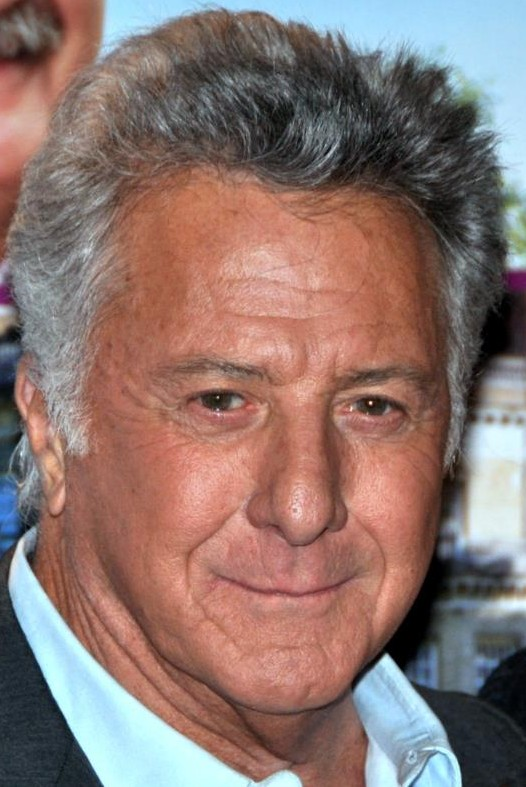
Dustin Hoffman

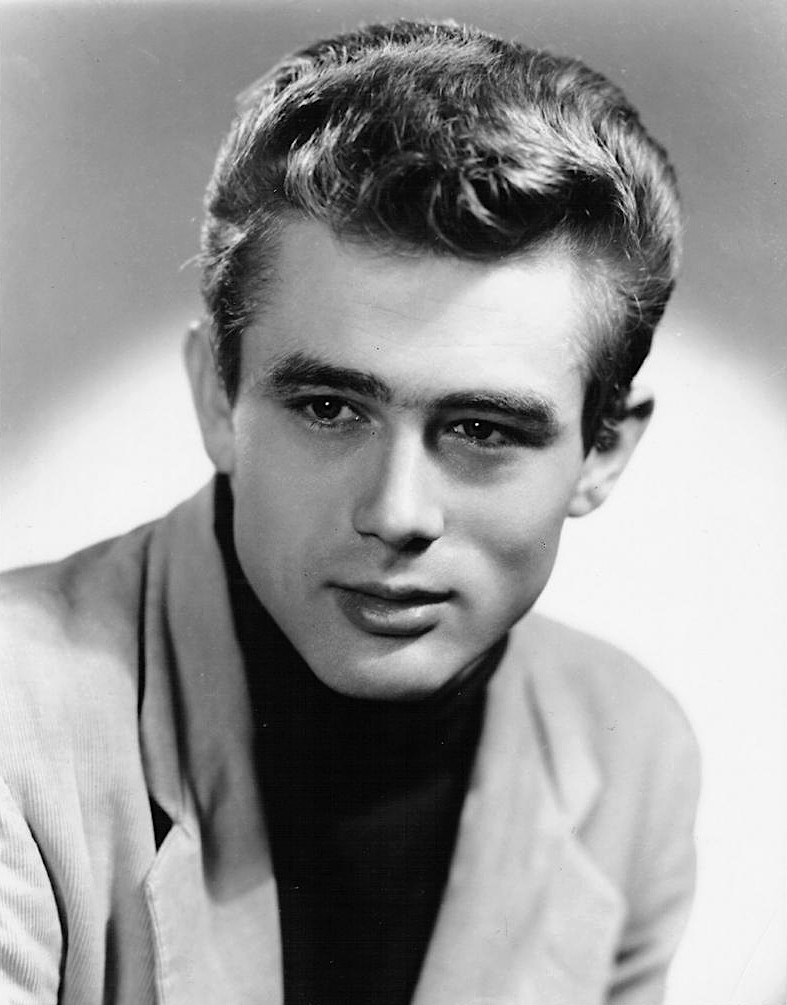
James Dean

- Amadour, artist, musician, writer
- Paul Thomas Anderson, film director
- Carmen Argote, artist
- Lloyd Avery II, actor
- Penn Badgley, actor
- Steven Blum, voice actor
- Daniele Bolelli, author, podcaster
- Mark Bradford, artist
- Chikezie, musician, American Idol finalist
- Rivers Cuomo, musician (Weezer)
- Phire Dawson, game show model, one of Barker's Beauties
- James Dean, actor
- John Densmore, drummer for The Doors
- Cliff Eidelman, musician
- Jack Elam, actor
- Will Estes, actor
- Emma Ferreira, artist, sculptor, photographer, and philanthropist
- Andrea Fay Friedman, actor
- Cam Gigandet, actor (Twilight)
- Josh Haden, musician
- Gustav Hasford, novelist and marine
- Dustin Hoffman, actor
- Remington Hoffman, actor
- Marco Hofschneider, actor
- Rickie Lee Jones, musician
- Mahira Khan, actor
- Sandra Knight, actor
- Robby Krieger, musician (The Doors)
- Alison Lohman, actor
- Teena Marie, singer
- Yael Markovich, Israeli/American model and beauty queen/pageant titleholder
- Duff McKagan, musician (Guns N' Roses, Velvet Revolver, Loaded)
- Kel Mitchell, actor
- Mike Muir, musician (Suicidal Tendencies)
- Tameka Norris, artist
- Dustin O'Halloran, post-classical pianist and composer
- Sean Penn, actor
- Kenneth Price, ceramic artist and printmaker
- Nick Sagan, novelist and screenwriter
- Anita Sarkeesian, video game critic
- Kentaro Sato, composer
- Arnold Schwarzenegger, actor and 38th governor of California
- Ryan Seacrest, radio personality, television host, network producer and voice actor
- Michele Serros, author
- Dax Shepard, actor, comedian, filmmaker, podcaster
- Gloria Stuart, actor
- Kristine Sutherland, actor
- Hilary Swank, actor
- Kenan Thompson, actor (attended)
- Tessa Thompson, actor
- Vaush (Ian Kochinski), political YouTube livestreamer
- Frank Welker, voice actor
- Gary Zekley, record producer

=== Sports ===
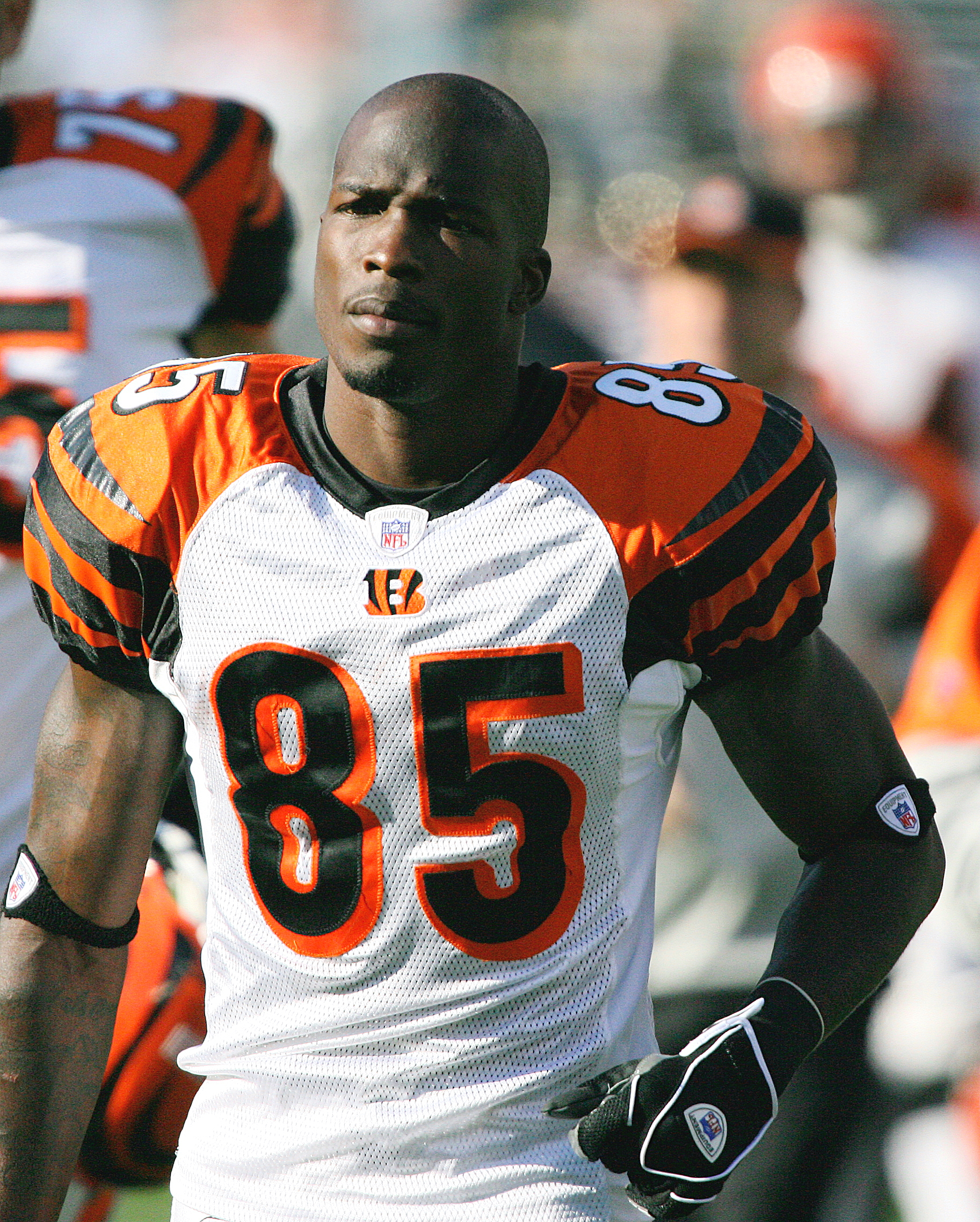
Chad Johnson

- John Adams, former NFL player
- Laila Ali, boxer
- Ralph Anderson, former NFL player
- Isaac Bruce, former NFL player
- Glenn Cowan, table tennis player
- Vic Darensbourg, MLB pitcher
- Thelma "Tiby" Eisen (1922-2014), baseball player
- George Farmer, former NFL player
- Anthony Frederick, former professional basketball player
- Lee Grosscup, former NFL player and broadcaster
- John Harris, former NFL player
- Barry Jaeckel, professional golfer
- Chad Johnson, former NFL wide receiver
- Jimmy Johnson, pro football hall of famer
- Brian Kingman, MLB pitcher
- Lenny Krayzelburg, swimmer
- Keith Lee, former NFL player
- Evan Lysacek, figure skating Olympic gold medalist
- Marv Marinovich, former NFL player
- Rodney McCray, MLB outfielder
- Candice Michelle, wrestler
- Fred Miller, former NFL player
- David Nwaba, NBA player
- Mac O'Grady, golfer
- Billy Parks, former NFL player
- Rob Picciolo, MLB infielder
- Al Scates, winningest volleyball coach in NCAA history
- Terry Schofield, former professional basketball player and coach
- Steve Smith Sr., former NFL wide receiver
- Deshawn Stephens, former professional basketball player
- Brian Stewart, NFL and college coach
- Genki Sudo, Japanese mixed martial artist
- Sean Whyte, CFL kicker
- Sidney Wicks, four-time NBA All-Star and 1972 NBA Rookie of the Year
- A. D. Williams, former NFL player
- Yehuda Zadok, Israeli Olympic runner

=== Other ===
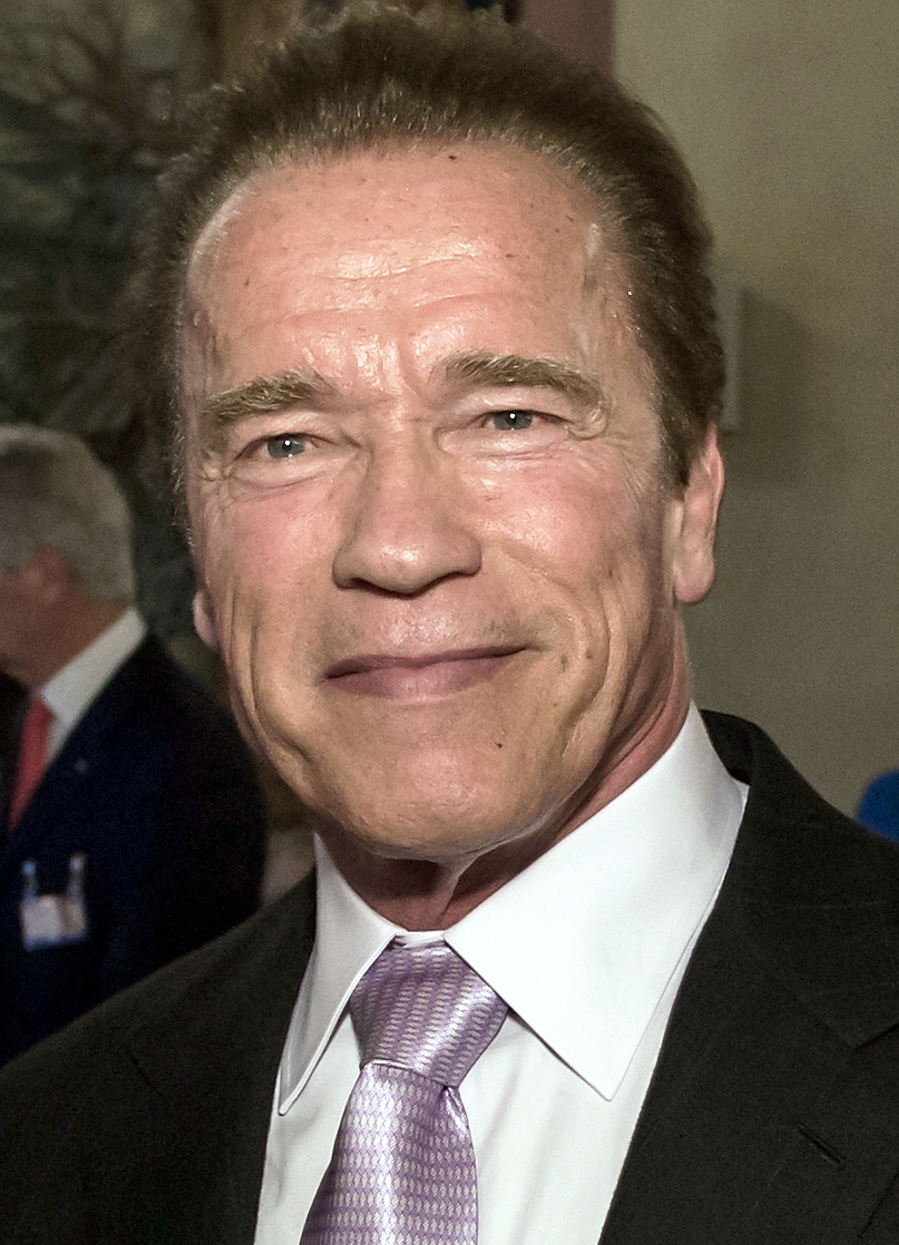
Arnold Schwarzenegger

- Walter Cunningham, astronaut
- Don Edwards, politician
- Bobbi Fiedler, United States Representative
- David Geffen, record executive
- Hee Sook Lee, businesswoman, founder of BCD Tofu House chain
- Monica Lewinsky, White House intern
- Nathan Myhrvold, former Microsoft chief technology officer
- Phil Remington, motorsports engineer
- Arnold Schwarzenegger, 38th governor of California, actor (A.A. 1977)
- Stephen Silberkraus, author, Nevada State Assemblyman
- Helen Singleton, civil rights activist and Freedom Rider
- Larry Stevenson, inventor, skateboarder pro
- Nick Webster, soccer commentator and Fox Soccer Channel personality
- Inonge Wina, vice president of Zambia

== Faculty ==
- Salvador Carrasco, film director (The Other Conquest) and head of SMC's Film Production Program
- Andy Hill (born c. 1950), 3x college national champion basketball player, President of CBS Productions and Channel One News, author, and motivational speaker
- Victor Millan (aka, Joseph Brown), actor; dean of the theatre arts department
