= Diane Levin =

American author, educator, and advocate (born 1947)

Diane E. Levin
- Born: Diane Elizabeth Levin; September 15, 1947 (age 78)
- Education: Tufts University, Medford, Massachusetts
- Writing career
- Subjects: Media literacy and media effects on children
- Notable works: So Sexy So Soon: The New Sexualized Childhood, And What Parents Can Do To Protect Their Kids (with Jean Kilbourne)
- Ph.D. thesis Peer Interaction As A Source Of Cognitive Developmental Change in Spatial Representation. 1978. OCLC 190827963.
- Website: dianeelevin.com

Diane Elizabeth Levin (born September 15, 1947) is an American author, educator, and advocate known for her work in media literacy and media effects on children.

== Education ==
Levin received her doctorate in Sociology of Education and Child Development from Tufts University in 1978.

== Biography ==
External videos
- "So Sexy So Soon" (interview)
- Family Confidential: Secrets of Successful Parenting (episode 14) via Annie Fox on YouTube

Levin is a professor of education at Wheelock College in Boston. She teaches courses on children's play, violence prevention and media literacy. Together with her colleague, Gail Dines, Levin teaches an annual summer seminar at Wheelock college. The institute: "Media Education in a Violent Society" was developed to address the effects of media violence on children.

Since 1985, Levin has been working with issues of violence in media culture and its effects on children, families, and schools. In March 1995, she visited New Zealand and led workshops, seminars, public meetings in the country's main cities and gave lectures and media interviews on the topic of war toys and children's play.

She is a founder of Teachers Resisting Unhealthy Children's Entertainment (TRUCE). Every year before the December holidays, TRUCE publishes a "Toy Action Guide" on their website. TRUCE also has a Media and Young Children Action Guide on line. Levin is also a founder of CCFC, the Campaign for a Commercial-Free Childhood and Defending the Early Years.

Companies, products, marketing practices and corporations criticized by Levin and the CCFC include, but are not limited to: BusRadio, Barbie, Channel One News, marketing in schools, marketing to infants and children under 8, and highly sexualized marketing.

== Bibliography ==
PhD thesis

- Levin, Diane E. (1978). Peer interaction as a source of cognitive developmental change in spatial representation (Ph.D. thesis). Tufts University, Medford, Massachusetts. OCLC 190827963.

Books

- Levin, Diane E.; Carlsson-Paige, Nancy (1990). Who's calling the shots?: how to respond effectively to children's fascination with war play and war toys. Philadelphia, Pennsylvania: New Society Publishers. ISBN 9780865711655.
- Levin, Diane E. (1994). Teaching young children in violent times: building a peaceable classroom. Cambridge, Massachusetts Philadelphia, Pennsylvania: Educators for Social Responsibility Distributed to the trade through New Society Publishers. ISBN 9780865713154.
- Levin, Diane (1998). Remote control childhood?: combating the hazards of media culture. Washington, D.C.: National Association for the Education of Young Children. ISBN 9780935989847.
- Levin, Diane E.; Carlsson-Paige, Nancy (1998). Before push comes to shove: building conflict resolution skills with children. St. Paul, Minnesota Beltsville, Maryland: Redleaf Press Distributed by Gryphon House. ISBN 9781884834530.
- Levin, Diane E.; Carlsson-Paige, Nancy (2006). The war play dilemma: what every parent and teacher needs to know. New York: Teachers College Press. ISBN 9780807746387.
- Levin, Diane E.; Kilbourne, Jean (2008). So sexy so soon: the new sexualized childhood, and what parents can do to protect their kids. New York: Ballantine Books. ISBN 9780345505071.
- Levin, Diane E. (2013). Beyond remote-controlled childhood: teaching young children in the media age. Washington, D.C.: National Association for the Education of Young Children. ISBN 9781928896982.

- Levin also blogs for The Huffington Post.
