= Alison Stewart =

American journalist

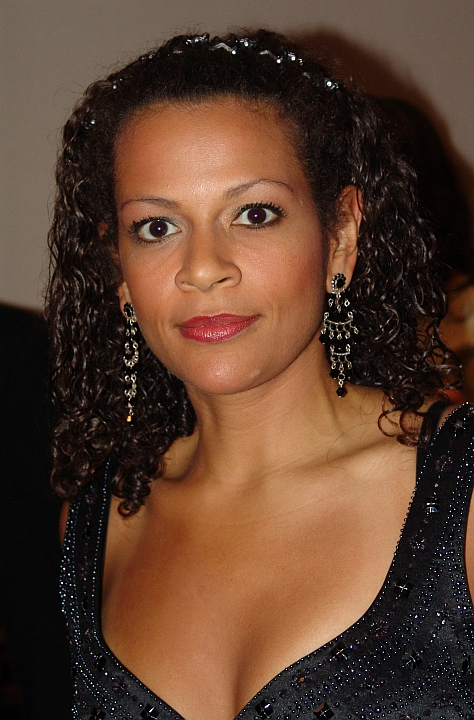
- Born: July 4, 1966 (age 60); Glen Ridge, New Jersey, U.S.
- Education: Brown University (BA)
- Occupations: Radio host Book author Television Personality; Television Journalist
- Website: Official website

Alison Stewart (born July 4, 1966) is an American journalist and author. Stewart first gained widespread visibility as a political correspondent for MTV News in the 1990s. She is the host of WNYC's midday show, All of It with Alison Stewart.

== Early life and education ==
Stewart was born in Glen Ridge, New Jersey. She is the daughter of the senior vice president for corporate affairs at Squibb Corporation, the pharmaceutical company in Princeton, New Jersey. Her mother taught biology at Columbia High School in Maplewood, New Jersey. She attended Brown University, where she earned a Bachelor of Arts degree in English and American literature. She began her broadcasting career there, where she was the music director for the school's radio station, WBRU.

== Career ==
=== 20th century ===
In 1988 Stewart began her career as an assistant at MTV. In 1991, she joined MTV News as a segment producer when she was hired by MTV News Director Linda Corradina. She began reporting and producing during MTV's first "Choose or Lose" campaign, which covered the 1992 presidential race. Her role in MTV's campaign coverage earned her a Peabody Award.

Stewart contributed segments to other MTV News shows in the 1990s, including Megadose (an alternative health program) and MTV News: Unfiltered. She also hosted specials including the Real World Reunion in 1995.

Following the 1996 "Choose or Lose" campaign, Stewart left MTV and moved to CBS News in December 1996. She reported for several of the network's news programs, including CBS News Sunday Morning, 48 Hours, and Public Eye with Bryant Gumbel.

=== 21st century ===
Moving to ABC News, she co-anchored its early morning news program, World News Now with Anderson Cooper, and contributed reports to Good Morning America and 20/20 Downtown. She earned an Emmy Award as part of ABC News's coverage of the 9/11 terrorist attacks.

In 2003, Stewart moved from ABC News to MSNBC, where she was a daytime anchor and primary substitute host for Countdown with Keith Olbermann and The Rachel Maddow Show. She occasionally filled in as a newsreader on NBC's Weekend Today. From May 2006 to April 2007, she hosted a daytime news program on MSNBC, The Most with Alison Stewart.

Stewart joined NPR in May 2007 to host (along with Luke Burbank) a multiplatform morning drive show, The Bryant Park Project, which targeted an online audience of younger listeners and adults ages 25 to 44. The program premiered October 1, 2007. In July 2008, NPR canceled the program due to budget constraints. Stewart returned from maternity leave to host the show's last week, July 21 to 25, 2008.

Stewart also served as a panelist on NPR's Wait Wait... Don't Tell Me! and as a fill-in host of NPR's Talk of the Nation and Weekend Edition.

On May 7, 2010, she became the co-host of a new show, Need to Know, on PBS. She left the show on September 9, 2011; in her departure announcement, she said she would be finishing a book she had "been working on for years."

In late 2011, Stewart returned to CBS News to report a story on cheating on standardized college admissions tests for 60 Minutes that aired on January 1, 2012. In 2012, she hosted the first season of the TED Radio Hour, a radio program (with podcast) produced by TED and NPR.

In 2013, her book First Class, a history of Dunbar High School (Washington, D.C.), was published. It was named one of the best books of 2013 by Mother Jones and Essence magazines. Her second book, Junk: Digging Through America's Love Affair with Stuff, was published in April 2016.

Stewart returned to PBS as a special correspondent in 2016 and served as a fill-in anchor for NewsHour Weekend and Charlie Rose. She continues to contribute to PBS and is also a contributor at The Atlantic LIVE.

In September 2018, Stewart was added to the WNYC lineup hosting a midday show, All of It with Alison Stewart. She also is the host of the book club live event series, Get Lit With All Of It.

== Works ==
- First Class. Chicago Review Press. August 2013. ISBN 978-1-61374-012-5.
- Junk: Digging Through America's Love Affair With Stuff. Chicago Review Press. April 2016. ISBN 978-1-61373-055-3.
