= Kenny Booker =

American basketball player (born 1948)

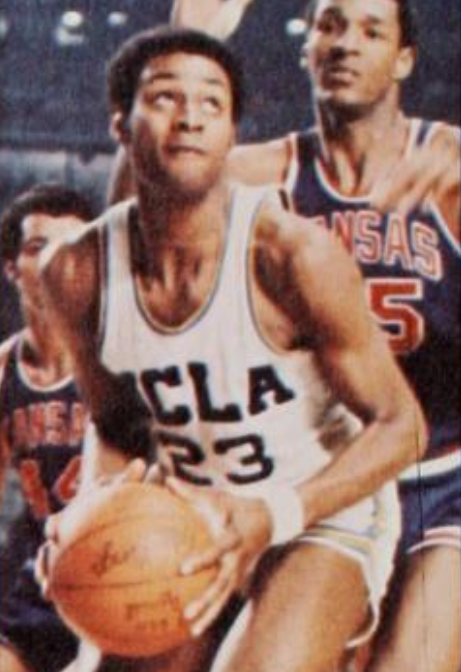
- Booker with UCLA in the 1971 Final Four

Personal information
- Born: November 20, 1948 (age 77) Los Angeles County, California, U.S.
- Listed height: 6 ft 4 in (1.93 m)
- Listed weight: 185 lb (84 kg)

Career information
- High school: Long Beach Poly (Long Beach, California)
- College: Long Beach CC (1966–1968); UCLA (1969–1971)
- NBA draft: 1971: 14th round, 213th overall pick
- Drafted by: Phoenix Suns
- Playing career: 1975–1977
- Position: Guard

Career highlights
- 2× NCAA champion (1970, 1971)
- Stats at Basketball Reference

Kenneth Arnold Booker (born November 20, 1948) is an American former professional basketball player. He played college basketball for the UCLA Bruins from 1969 to 1971, winning a national championship in each of his two seasons of play. He played two seasons professionally in Europe.

After helping his high school team win two championships, Booker went to junior college at Long Beach City College. He was an all-conference player for the Vikings, and was later inducted into their Hall of Champions. He transferred to the University of California, Los Angeles (UCLA), where he was a defensive specialist. Booker was a key reserve player in his first year of play. He moved to the guard position and became a starter as a senior, when he won his second national title with the Bruins, part of a run of seven consecutive championships by UCLA coach John Wooden. After college, Booker had a brief stint playing professionally, and also coached for a year in high school. He later became a realtor, and has also been a high school basketball official for over 30 years.

== Early life ==
Booker grew up in Long Beach, California, and went to high school at Long Beach Polytechnic, where he won two California Interscholastic Federation (CIF) basketball championships. He was named to All-Southern California Board of Basketball all-star team as a center in 1966.

He went to Long Beach City College for two years, and changed to playing forward. As a freshman, he broke into the starting lineup in late December, and was named the team's Most Promising Freshman after helping the Vikings to a conference title in 1967. Booker received honorable mention for the All-Metropolitan Conference team that year, before being named to the second team in 1968. He was inducted into the Vikings Hall of Champions in 2006.

== College career ==
Booker's play earned him a full scholarship to play for Coach John Wooden at UCLA. While he was among the leading scorers on his high school and junior college teams, Booker was a defensive specialist with the Bruins, and helped them win their fourth and fifth out of seven consecutive National Collegiate Athletic Association (NCAA) titles under Wooden. He sat out his initial season with UCLA in 1968–69, redshirting to preserve his remaining two years of eligibility. In his first year of play in 1969–70, he came off the bench to curb Geoff Petrie of Princeton and Paul Westphal of USC, who were going off against the Bruins. Petrie had scored 26 points in 28 minutes before Booker entered the game and held him to two free throws in the final 12 minutes. Booker played significant minutes late in the season and was a top reserve.

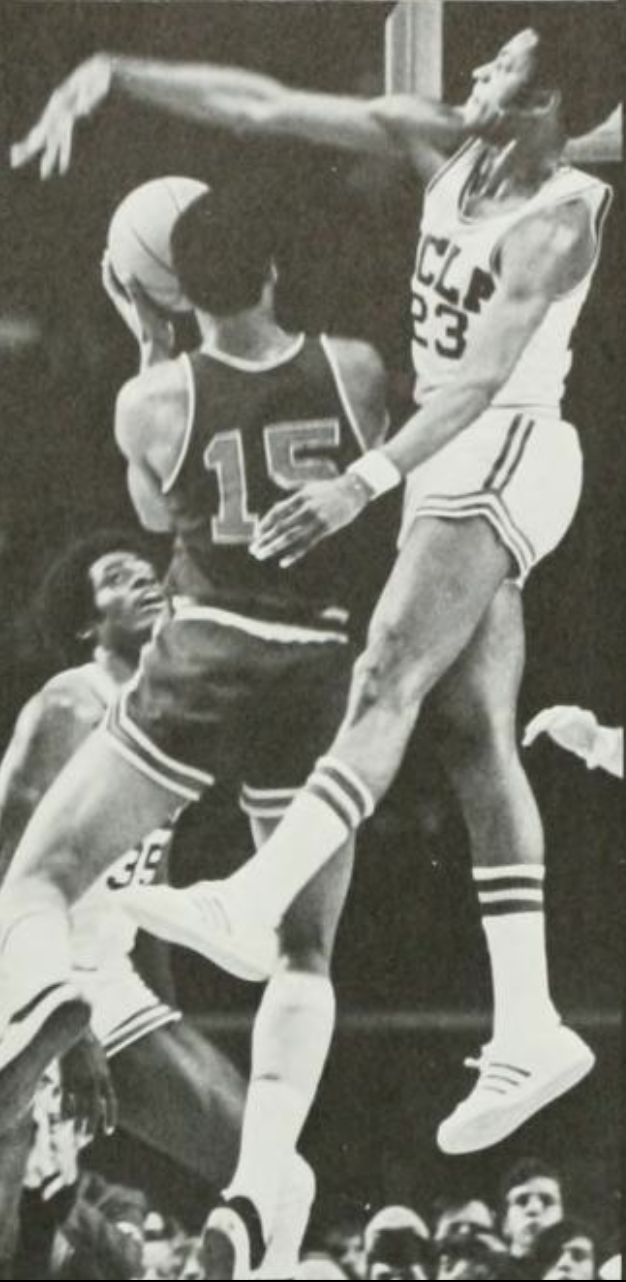
Booker (right) was a defensive specialist for the Bruins

As a senior in 1970–71, Booker was converted from forward to guard to replace the graduated John Vallely in the starting lineup. He was the lone new starter from the 1970 championship team, getting the nod over Andy Hill and Terry Schofield. At 6 feet 4 inches (1.93 m) and 185 pounds (84 kg), Booker was the team's best perimeter defender, and was called "a fine defensive and team player" by Wooden. The Bruins started the season 14–0 before losing 89–82 to Notre Dame. Booker began the game defending the Fighting Irish's Austin Carr, who finished the game with 46 points, but Wooden then used Schofield and Larry Hollyfield instead. The coaching staff had instructed Booker to overplay Carr and expect help on defense if Carr drove to the basket. However, Wooden absolved Booker, declaring that he never received the help from the inside that was expected. Though the loss ended a 19-game winning streak, UCLA proceeded to win their next 88 games, an NCAA record. (Note: UCLA did not lose again until January 19, 1974, when they were defeated again by Notre Dame, 71–70.)

On February 6, 1971, Booker helped key a 64–60 comeback victory for No. 2 UCLA over No. 1 USC. He had three steals in the final minutes as the Trojans were held to one point in the final 9:35, helping the Bruins rally from a 59–50 deficit. Booker also scored 14 points in the game, making seven of 10 field goals. For the season, Booker averaged 5.5 points and 2.6 rebounds per game, as the Bruins finished 29–1 and captured their seventh national championship in eight seasons.

== Professional career ==
After college, Booker was selected in the 14th round of the 1971 NBA draft by the Phoenix Suns, as well as in the eighth round of the American Basketball Association draft by the Indiana Pacers. He tried out with Phoenix, surviving multiple cuts before being released in September 1971. In October, Booker was appointed as the head coach of Verbum Dei High School's basketball team, who were the defending CIF Southern Section 4-A Division champions. He coached the school for one season before quitting, leading them to a Del Rey League championship in 1972 as well as their second-straight CIF 4-A title; it was also the school's fourth-straight CIF championship at any level. (Note: Verbum Dei won a 2-A championship in 1969 and a 3-A in 1970.) In 1975 he went to Italy, and played professionally for two years in Europe.

In 1988, Booker became a realtor in Long Beach with Coldwell Banker. As of 2010, he has been a high school basketball official in Southern California for over 30 years. He was named Referee of the Year by the Orange County Sports Association in 2009, and he has officiated high school volleyball matches as well.
