= Need to Know (TV program) =

- Presented by: Alison Stewart; Jon Meachem
- Country of origin: United States
- No. of seasons: 3
- No. of episodes: 166

Production
- Running time: 54 minutes (May 7, 2010 – September 9, 2011); 24 minutes (September 16, 2011 – June 28, 2013)
- Production company: WNET

Original release
- Network: PBS
- Release: May 7, 2010 – June 28, 2013

Need to Know is an American public television news program produced by WNET (a New York City PBS station) that was broadcast weekly on all Public Broadcasting Service (PBS) affiliated stations in the United States plus ABC News 24 in Australia. It aired from May 2010 until June 2013.

PBS stated that the show was intended to fill the public affairs and "hard"/investigative news void left by both the one-hour Bill Moyers Journal (which had ended with Moyers' ultimately temporary retirement), and the cancelled half-hour NOW on PBS (hosted by investigative journalist David Brancaccio, a Moyers protégé). Both departing shows had been long-running, highly rated, and critically acclaimed for their journalistic quality and focus on issues that deeply impacted regular Americans' lives yet went largely ignored by commercial TV news outlets. "NTK" branded itself the "TV and Web newsmagazine [that] gives you what you need to know."

PBS had described the show as "a multi-platform current affairs news magazine, uniting broadcast and web in an innovative approach to newsgathering and reporting." Initially, it was co-hosted by Alison Stewart (a regular contributor to NPR, and, at the time, The Rachel Maddow Show's main substitute-host)) and Jon Meachem (a journalist, author, and then-editor-in-chief of Newsweek magazine). Later, the show was hosted by one journalist (out of a rotating group of three) who presented pre-taped correspondent pieces, then asked follow-up questions of the correspondent, in-studio. A short segment followed, in which a prominent person reflected on a difference-making period from his or her past.

Throughout its first year-plus, the show failed to live up to the lofty expectations and high production budget that PBS had set for it. Many loyal PBS viewers were sharply critical of the show's style and content (or, the alleged lack thereof), and thousands of "viewer mail" comments flooded into the offices of PBS' ombudsman.

The show's ratings fell far short of those it replaced, and several attempts to re-tool it were made. For example, in April 2011, Meacham's role changed to that of "contributing editor" (i.e., a recurring commentary segment) and Stewart became the show's sole anchor. The show's format was changed further effective September 16, 2011, for both the broadcast and website; NPR's Scott Simon guest-hosted the first episode with this new format. The website stated that the show would "spend the next 15 months covering the campaign for president, but we’re going to do it differently...covering the campaign from the voters’ perspective, not the candidates’". The costly production was halved to a 30-minute format, and Stewart left the show on September 9, 2011, citing the desire to focus on a book project and her family, plus, a lack of interest in the show's new direction.

In May 2013, PBS officials informed the network's member stations that Need to Know would be replaced by Charlie Rose Weekend (later retitled Charlie Rose: The Week) in July. WNET declined to comment on the cancellation.

Many of the employees who had worked on Need to Know were expected to move to PBS NewsHour's new, weekend edition, also produced by WNET. Marc Rosenwasser, who was the executive producer of Need to Know, served in the same capacity for PBS NewsHour Weekend, which premiered on September 7, 2013.

== Anchors ==
- Alison Stewart
- Jon Meachem
- Scott Simon
