= Lesley Cohen (politician) =

American politician (born 1970)

Lesley E. Cohen
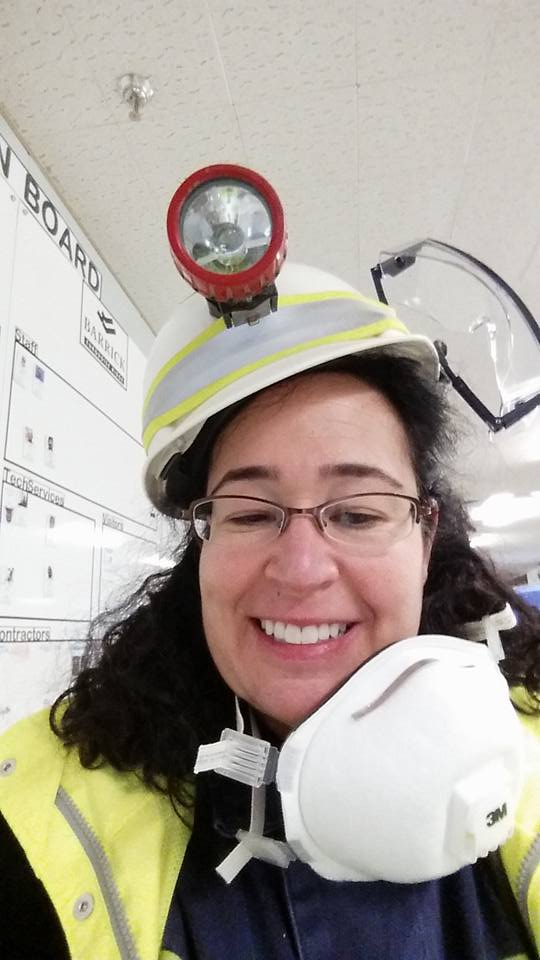

Member of the Nevada Assembly from the 29th district
- In office November 9, 2016 – November 6, 2024
- Preceded by: Stephen Silberkraus
- Succeeded by: Joe Dalia
- In office 2013–2014
- Preceded by: April Mastroluca
- Succeeded by: Stephen Silberkraus

Personal details
- Born: December 22, 1970 (age 55) New York City, U.S.
- Party: Democratic
- Education: University of Nevada, Reno; Depaul University
- Profession: Divorce Attorney

Lesley Cohen (born December 22, 1970) is an American politician. She was a Democratic member of the Nevada Assembly, serving from 2016 to 2024 (and previously from 2013 until 2014). The Clark County Commission appointed Cohen to the Assembly after the resignation of April Mastroluca following the 2012 general election. Republican Stephen Silberkraus defeated Cohen in the 2014 general election by more than 1,300 votes but she retook the seat in the 2016 election by 212 votes. Cohen is also a divorce attorney. She is Jewish.
