= Channel One News =

Daily news program for U.S. schools

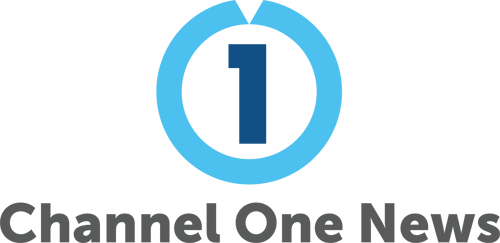
- Country: United States

Ownership
- Owner: Whittle Communications (1989-1994); Primedia Inc. (1994-2007); Alloy Media+Marketing (2007-2012); ZelnickMedia (2012-May 13, 2014); Houghton Mifflin Harcourt (May 13, 2014-May 2018)

History
- Launched: March 6, 1989 (pilot program debut); 1990 (national debut)
- Closed: May 2018

Channel One News was an American news content provider. Its televised daily news program was accompanied by commercial advertising for marketing in schools, with supplementary educational resources. The Peabody award-winning Channel One News program was broadcast mainly to minors, advertising a way for young teens to understand happenings worldwide. Susan Winston (former executive producer of Good Morning America) and Daniel Funk were brought in to design the broadcast and produce the six weeks of test shows. On May 13, 2014, it was sold for an undisclosed price to Houghton Mifflin Harcourt. On June 28, 2018, HMH announced that Channel One's last broadcast occurred in May and that they would be "winding down ongoing operations".

== History ==
Channel One was founded in 1989. It began with a pilot program in four high schools before its national rollout in 1990, with original anchors and reporters Ken Rogers, Lynne Blades, and Brian Tochi. Christopher Whittle founded it along with co-founder Ed Winter, advertising and marketing executives based in Knoxville, Tennessee. Primedia Inc. purchased Channel One for approximately $250 million from Whittle in 1994, with Ed Winter remaining as chairman for several more years.

The program's first executive producer, Cynthia Samuels, came to Channel One from 9 years on Today. While at Channel One, she created Student Producer Week (in which students produced, reported, directed, and designed an entire week of programming), Channel One's one-hour specials (including one in Moscow and Ohio, one in Tokyo and Texas, one in Los Angeles after the Rodney King riots hosted by Arsenio Hall) and OneVote (an "election night" for students to vote for president and watch the returns come in live from their classrooms). After Cynthia Samuels came Douglas Greenlaw, former president of MTV, followed by David Neuman, former vice president of comedy at NBC.

From 1997 until 2000, Andy Hill was president of programming for Channel One News, where he produced award-winning news programming for an audience of eight million American teens.

In December 2007, Channel One's parent company, Primedia, classified its Education Segment, which includes Channel One Network, as a "discontinued operation" and announced that it was "exploring strategic alternatives for" the businesses in that segment. In 2007, Primedia sold Channel One to Alloy Media.

In July 2007, NBC News announced that it would be partnering with Alloy under an arrangement in which NBC would work with Channel One News to produce original content for Channel One's in-school broadcasts, providing Channel One with access to global news gathering resources. In 2009, CBS News entered into a partnership with Channel One.

Alloy was bought by ZelnickMedia in 2010. On May 13, 2014, Channel One was acquired by the educational publisher Houghton Mifflin Harcourt; the company stated that the purchase would foster the "continued development of high-quality digital content for students, teachers, and parents across multiple modalities, and will bring significant video and cross-media production capabilities in-house."

== Business model ==
The original model for Channel One had it providing schools and school districts with televisions, headend units, and satellite receivers. Schools would record the broadcast and transmit it into classrooms. Ads were displayed during the broadcast to cover the costs of the equipment. Starting in 1989, schools began to accept two minutes of advertisement. In 2011, the network began offering a subscription fee to receive an ad-free version of its transmissions.

== OneVote ==
Channel One held mock presidential elections called OneVote shortly before the general elections in 1992, 2000, 2004, 2008, 2012, and 2016. With the exception of the 2016 election, the popular vote winner in each OneVote election accurately predicted the electoral college winner of the respective real presidential election.

1992: The initial vote in 1992 had 3,400,000 participants. Bill Clinton won the 1992 OneVote, garnering 43% of the vote. George H. W. Bush got 27%, with independent H. Ross Perot getting 24% of the vote.

2000: When OneVote returned in 2000, 877,497 students participated, choosing Texas Governor George W. Bush in a mock election with nearly 59% of the vote. Vice-president Al Gore was voted second with 36% of the vote.

2004: The 2004 OneVote gave George W. Bush 55% of the vote. John Kerry finished second with 40% of the vote, while all third-party candidates as a group (voters could only vote for them as a group) got 5%. The vote consisted of 1,400,000 students.

2008: The 2008 OneVote gave Barack Obama 51.5 percent of the vote. John McCain finished second with 48.5 percent.

2012: The 2012 OneVote gave Barack Obama 50 percent of the vote. Mitt Romney finished second with 44 percent.

2016: The 2016 OneVote gave Hillary Clinton 47 percent of the vote. Donald Trump finished second with 41 percent.

== Controversy ==
Channel One was controversial largely because of the commercial content of the show. Critics claimed that it was a problem in classrooms because it forced children to watch ads and wasted class time and tax dollars. Supporters argued that the ads were necessary to help keep the program running and lease TVs, VCRs, and satellite dishes to schools, as well as commercial-free educational video through Channel One Connection. In 2006, the American Academy of Pediatrics reported that research indicated that children who watched Channel One remembered the commercials more than they remembered the news.

Another criticism, noted by Media Education Foundation's documentary Captive Audience, was that very little time was dedicated to actual news and that the majority of the programming was corporate marketing and PR tie-ins to promote products and services, arguing that it further corrupted the school setting with consumerism.

Yet another criticism came in 1991 by a watchdog group citing irresponsible advertising. Channel One had been cited alongside a bladder pad commercial calling incontinence "part of being female" when it was a medical concern for both sexes, and Old Milwaukee beer for sexism in the Swedish Bikini Team ads. Whittle Communications was cited for having a Channel One program for showing the functions of the human heart while selling advertising space for fast food and candy bars in the same program.

== Former anchors ==
Channel One News had seven anchors/correspondents on its roster. Here are some of those who rotated between 1993 and 2018.

- Serena Altschul (correspondent for CBS News Sunday Morning)
- Tony Anderson
- Errol Barnett (anchor and correspondent for CBS News and its streaming channel)
- Chris Browne
- Mark Carter
- Azia Celestino
- Janet Choi
- Gotham Chopra
- Anderson Cooper (anchor on CNN and talk show host)
- Adriana Diaz
- Seth Doane (correspondent on CBS News)
- Julian Dujarric
- Scott Evans (reporter/anchor at Access Hollywood)
- Steven Fabian (correspondent on Inside Edition)
- Justin Finch (correspondent on Inside Edition)
- Jared Friesen
- Tom Hanson
- Arielle Hixson
- Shelby Holliday
- Cassie Hudson
- Craig Jackson (host of VH1's I Love Money)
- Brian Kilmeade (co-host on Fox News Channel and host on Fox News Radio)
- Keith Kocinski
- Kathy Kroenenberger
- Jessica Kumari
- Hicks Neal
- Demetrius Pipkin
- Emily Reppert
- Maggie Rulli
- Sofia Lidskog
- Lisa Ling (host of Our America on OWN: The Oprah Winfrey Network and This is Life with Lisa Ling on CNN)
- Laura Ling (Director of Development for Discovery Digital Networks)
- Alex Marquardt (correspondent on CNN)
- Tonoccus McClain
- Maria Menounos (host on E! News)
- Alexandra Montoya
- Meka Nichols
- Taryn Winter Brill (Features Correspondent on Good Morning America & Correspondent on The CBS Early Show)
- Monica Novotny (anchor on MSNBC)
- Kris Osborn (correspondent for Entertainment Tonight)
- Michele Ruiz
- Alex Sanz (Managing Editor at CBS News and Stations)
- Derrick Shore (host of Houston Life on KPRC-TV)
- Tracy Smith (correspondent on CBS News Sunday Morning)
- Brian Tochi
- Rawley Valverde
- Justin Gunn

== See also ==
- BusRadio
- Cable in the Classroom
