= The Most with Alison Stewart =

US television program

- Also known as: The Most
- Presented by: Alison Stewart
- Country of origin: United States
- Original language: English

Production
- Running time: 60 minutes

Original release
- Network: MSNBC
- Release: May 1, 2006 – April 19, 2007

The Most is an American television news program on MSNBC. Broadcast live at 12:00 PM ET daily, the program focused on the top news stories of the day people are looking at on MSNBC.com. In addition, the program also aired "the most watched or sought after" material on the Internet, including the most watched viral videos of the day.

The show was hosted by Alison Stewart, with contributors Tony Maciulis and the shows producer appearing in the program. MSNBC anchors Chris Jansing, JJ Ramberg, Keith Olbermann, correspondent Monica Novotny, and Rita Cosby served as substitute hosts on the program.

When The Most moved to its final timeslot in December 2006, a new feature was added. An exclusive online webcast of the program aired from 11:58 AM through to the end of the first commercial. Web-exclusive content aired during the television commercial break.
