= Kris Osborn =

American journalist

Kris Osborn (born May 16, 1969) is a journalist, military expert, and former news anchor. He worked at CNN Headline News from 2001 to 2004 as an anchor, and specialized in military issues. He has worked as a reporter for KSTP-TV in Minneapolis and a correspondent for Entertainment Tonight. He has written articles for the Washington Times and reported for KO NewsMachine, an independent news-content company. He has appeared as an expert military guest on MSNBC and Fox News.

== Biography ==
Born in Cincinnati, Ohio, Osborn spent most of his childhood in Gloucester, Massachusetts. His parents divorced when he was quite young, and he and his brother spent most of their time living with their father, a psychiatrist, and their stepmother. Osborn also has two stepsisters from his father's second marriage. His mother was murdered in 1991, when he was a junior in college.

He attended Suffield Academy, a co-educational boarding school in Suffield, Connecticut. Osborn is a 1992 graduate of Kenyon College, in Gambier, Ohio, where he pursued a double major in English and political science and was a member of the swim team, on which he earned three NCAA championships and ten All-American honors. He went on to earn his master's degree in comparative literature from Columbia University and initially planned to be a college professor.

At the same time he was in graduate school, Osborn worked as a reporter for Channel One News in Los Angeles. One of the first stories he covered was the Oklahoma City bombing. From Channel One, where he worked for four years, he went on to Fox News in 1998 as a New York correspondent, where he worked as general assignment anchor and contributor to the Fox News website. In July 2001, he joined CNN Headline News as a primetime general assignment anchor covering technology news and quickly became known for his coverage of military stories. While at CNN, Osborn reported extensively on the 9/11 terrorist attacks and the United States war in Afghanistan. He left the network in February 2004 and joined Entertainment Tonight in June 2004 as a correspondent, where he covered the Democratic National Convention. He was no longer associated with Entertainment Tonight, however, by the following November. From 2006 through 2009, Osborn wrote for Defense News. Osborn also worked for the United States Army as a Highly Qualified Expert (HQE). He currently serves as Managing Editor of Warrior Maven, a military-specific news site focused on weapons, emerging technology and military history. Osborn also serves as Defense Editor for The National Interest. Osborn also serves as Military Affairs Editor for 19FortyFive.

Osborn is an avid reader, athlete, and sports fan. He also is a fan of the heavy-metal rock bands Metallica and Judas Priest as well as the English romantic poet William Wordsworth.
