= Never Say Never Mind: The Swedish Bikini Team =

2001 British film spoof by Buzz Feitshans IV

- Directed by: Buzz Feitshans IV
- Written by: Ron Bryan and B. Daniel Martinez
- Starring: John Rhys-Davies; Bruce Payne; William Hope
- Release date: 2001
- Running time: 93 minutes
- Country: England
- Language: English

Never Say Never Mind: The Swedish Bikini Team is a 2001 British film spoof starring Bruce Payne, John Rhys-Davies and Cecilie Bull. It was directed by Buzz Feitshans IV.

== Plot ==
Evolution films described the film thus: 'In the tradition of James Bond and Austin Powers, comes a "Girl Power" action comedy "Never Say…Never Mind" featuring the Swedish Bikini Team (SBT). The SBT is composed of five stunningly beautiful, highly intelligent and adventurous women, although one of them meets an unfortunate death early in the film. On land, on the high seas and high in the sky, the SBT members do their best to repel the forces of evil. On their mission, they find themselves in London where, for their meritorious service to the free world, the Queen knights them as Dames.

Now, they must locate and erase a black market copy of the infamous Los Alamos hard drive. They must prevent INTERR, the nefarious international terrorist organization, and one of their key representatives, Hakim (John Rhys-Davies), from possessing the top secret schematics for high level nuclear triggering mechanisms and weapons system.

The SBT are trained in close quarters combat, improvised weapons and modern tactical warfare methods by the extremely secretive CSD, the Covert Situations Division of the Swedish Military. They're certified master divers and also qualified as a UDT, Underwater Demolition Team and have worked in conjunction with the British SAS, Special Airborne Service, and a United States Marine Recon team.

The mysterious Mr. Blue (Bruce Payne) is the founder and CEO of Blue, Ltd, a think-tank for NATO countries. He is a logistics expert who co-ordinates the SBT activities leasing them out to friendly governments and worthy private corporations on a case-by-case basis. They get involved in both government and high-level corporate intrigue.

In a combination of beauty, brains and bravery, the SBT come together in a spectacular display of what girl power is really all about. Their high-tech gizmos and combat techniques are enough to give even James Bond a run for his money'.

== Cast ==
- Bruce Payne as Mr. Blue
- John Rhys-Davies as Hakim
- Cecilie Bull as Gunnel
- Vendela Stjernstrom as Vendela
- Asa as Asa
- Erika as Erika
- Janet McCabe as Double Oh
- Anthony Brophy as Sean

== Reception ==
One reviewer stated that the film was 'enormous fun and full of Bondian touches, a must-see. The Daily Telegraph described the film as a "cross between Austin Powers, Charlie's Angels and James Bond".
