= April Mastroluca =

American politician

Member of the Nevada State Assembly from the 29th district
- In office November 5, 2008 – November 29, 2012
- Preceded by: Susan Gerhardt
- Succeeded by: Lesley Cohen

Personal details
- Born: 1968 (age 57–58) Hayward, California
- Party: Democratic

April Mastroluca (born 1968) is an American politician who served in the Nevada State Assembly from the 29th district from 2008 to 2012.
