= Susan Gerhardt =

American politician

Member of the Nevada State Assembly from the 29th district
- In office November 3, 2004 – November 5, 2008
- Preceded by: Josh Griffin
- Succeeded by: April Mastroluca

Personal details
- Born: 1957 (age 68–69) Omaha, Nebraska
- Party: Democratic

Susan Gerhardt (born 1957) is an American politician who served in the Nevada State Assembly from the 29th district from 2004 to 2008.
