= Swedish Bikini Team =

Group of female models

The Swedish Bikini Team was a group of American female models who appeared in an advertising campaign for Old Milwaukee beer. These commercials ran for several months in 1991 in the United States, playing with American stereotypes of Scandinavian women being blonde and having big breasts. The premise of the commercials was that a group of bored or thirsty men were "saved" by the Swedish Bikini Team. Other commercials would focus on a group of men male bonding on a hunting trip and saying "Guys, it does not get any better than this", to which a narrator would say the man was wrong and an Old Milwaukee truck would drive miles off road toward them claiming "it improved", "..and when the Swedish Bikini Team showed up, it got somewhat better."

While the campaign generated widespread interest, the advertisements were eventually dropped after protests by the National Organization for Women and female employees of the Pabst Brewing Company.

While this advertising campaign provoked controversy, similar campaigns using attractive spokesmodels to sell beverages have followed in the U.S., with less resistance — such as the Coors twins Diane and Elaine Klimaszewski, and the "Fantanas": spokesmodels for Fanta soft drinks.

== Members of the team ==
The Swedish Bikini Team had Danish and Norwegian surnames and were played by American actresses wearing platinum blonde wigs.

- Avalon Anders as Uma Thorensen
- Suzanna Keller as Karin Kristensen
- Heather Elizabeth Parkhurst as Hilgar Oblief
- Jane Frances as Eva Jacobsen
- Peggy Trentini as Ulla Swensen

== Other appearances ==
The team appeared outside of the commercial campaign on several occasions including on the cover and a pictorial in Playboy and on a Married... with Children episode, "The Gas Station Show". They also had a non speaking appearance on a schooner on an episode of The Adventures of Mark and Brian, where Mark and Brian underwent US Coast Guard training and were attempting to impress the girls by being coasties and asking if they needed rescuing (to which their jet ski then embarrassingly capsizes).

The team, played by different actresses, also starred in the video Never Say Never Mind: The Swedish Bikini Team with John Rhys-Davies.

Team member Heather Elizabeth Parkhurst appeared on Ken Reid's TV Guidance Counselor podcast on April 22, 2015 and discussed the Swedish Bikini Team at length.

== In popular culture ==
The idea of a "Swedish Bikini Team" has endured in popular culture, despite Sweden never fielding such a group. The movies Dumb and Dumber, Beerfest and Boat Trip include female Swedish teams, inspired by the originals.
