= Andy Hill (basketball) =

American basketball player and entertainment executive (born c. 1950)

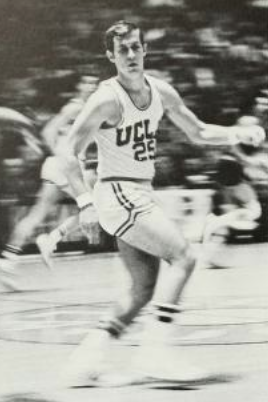
- Hill playing basketball with UCLA in 1969–70
- Born: Andrew William Hill c. 1950 (age 75–76); Los Angeles, California, U.S.
- Education: UCLA
- Occupations: Author and motivational speaker
- Known for: Former three-time college national champion basketball player, President of CBS Productions and Channel One News
- Notable work: Be Quick—But Don't Hurry: Finding Success in the Teachings of a Lifetime
- Height: 6 ft 1 in (185 cm)

Andrew William Hill (born c. 1950) is an American former basketball player and current author and motivational speaker. He played college basketball for the UCLA Bruins, winning three national championships in the early 1970s under Coach John Wooden. After a brief career playing professionally overseas, Hill entered the entertainment industry. He became president of two media companies, CBS Productions and Channel One News. He reconnected with Wooden after 25 years, and they co-wrote a best-selling book based on the application of Wooden's coaching principles to the business world.

== Early life ==
Hill was born and raised in Los Angeles in the Westwood area, and is Jewish. His father was emotionally detached and abusive. Growing up, Hill watched the UCLA basketball team around town before Pauley Pavilion was built, and dreamed of playing for them and Coach John Wooden.

He went to high school at University High in West Los Angeles. A skilled shooter, playing guard on the University High Warriors basketball team Hill was the unanimous pick for Western League Most Valuable Player (MVP) as a senior in 1968, when he was the second-leading scorer in Los Angeles at 27.2 points per game. For the second straight year, he earned first-team All-Los Angeles City honors. He was considered one of the top prospects in the country.

== College career ==
Hill attended UCLA on a basketball scholarship, and in 1969 averaged 19 points and 8 assists per game and shared MVP honors on the freshman team with Henry Bibby, the squad's leading scorer (26.8).

He was selected for Team USA to play in the 1969 Maccabiah Games. However, when he asked UCLA's athletic director J.D. Morgan if he could play in the Games, Morgan replied that if he did so the NCAA would not allow him to play again for UCLA when he returned.

Hill won three straight National Collegiate Athletic Association (NCAA) championships as a member of the varsity UCLA Bruins under Wooden. However, the 6-foot-1-inch (1.85 m) backup guard played sparingly, and took just 99 shots in those three years. UCLA had many talented players during that era, and many of those who ended up being reserves arguably would have started on other teams.

Wooden chose not to play Hill much, believing that teammates such as Bibby and Kenny Booker were better players. However, Hill was convinced that his political views and outspoken nature were directly related to his lack of playing time. He clashed with Wooden over politics and the handling of reserve players, and the coach once suggested that he transfer schools. Given the poor relationship he had with his father, Hill craved for Wooden to be a father figure. Nonetheless, Hill came to feel neglected and believed that Wooden did not like him. He graduated in 1972 thinking he would never see Wooden again.

== Professional basketball career ==
Hill had a brief stint playing professionally in Israel for Maccabi Ramat Gan. He then returned to the U.S. and coached at Santa Monica College for a few years in Southern California. During this time, Hill conceived of a statistic to more accurately reflect a basketball player's impact while on the court and how it affected their team's success, which he called the "Team Contribution Index." Hill wrote and sent an article about the Team Contribution Index to Scholastic Coach magazine, which published the article as part of their January 1977 issue. After the publication of his article, Hill utilized his new metric with his Santa Monica players in what was ultimately Hill’s final year of coaching. However, Hill's Team Contribution Index would help inspire the usage of the plus-minus statistic to become more common in basketball, with the NBA and college basketball respectively adding the metric to official box scores in 2007 and 2018.

== Entertainment industry ==
He discovered that coaching did not suit him, and entered the entertainment industry when he was 28. He became an accomplished movie and television executive with Columbia Pictures Television, and established his own production company. From 1991 though 1996, Hill was the president of CBS Productions, leading the development and production of programming owned by the network. He oversaw some of the most successful primetime shows of the decade, including Touched by an Angel; Caroline in the City; Dr. Quinn, Medicine Woman; Walker, Texas Ranger; Dave's World; and Rescue 911. With other romantic comedy options in the works, CBS' programming department passed on Caroline In the City. However, Hill was convinced it was a hit program, and found a buyer for the show in NBC. It was the first series that NBC had bought from a rival network, as well as the first one that CBS had sold to a competitor. Hill called NBC's decision "the most important statement CBS Productions has ever made about our legitimacy in this business."

In 1996, Hill asked to be released from his CBS contract to join MCA Inc., but his boss—CBS Entertainment President Leslie Moonves—refused. However, Hill left CBS the following year. From 1997 until 2000, he was president of programming for Channel One News, where he produced award-winning news programming for an audience of eight million American teens.

After 25 years had passed since he last saw Wooden, Hill was reminded of his former coach while playing golf. Hill's playing partner advised him to "Don't hurry, get your balance", which evoked a Wooden maxim of "Be quick, but don't hurry." Realizing that the coach's teachings had subconsciously guided his life and career, Hill was inspired to contact Wooden, and they developed a close friendship. "Once we were away from basketball, from my thinking I should play more, I could see [Wooden] did care about me," Hill said.

He co-wrote Be Quick—But Don't Hurry! Finding Success in the Teachings of a Lifetime with Wooden. The bestseller details how Hill applied his experience as a player under Wooden to achieve success in his career as a television executive. His goal was to demonstrate the relevance of Wooden's coaching style to the business world. The book also delves into his personal relationship with Wooden as his coach and mentor. After publishing the book, Hill became a motivational speaker on leadership and life coaching.

== Honors ==
In 2016 he was inducted into the Southern California Jewish Sports Hall of Fame.

== Publications ==
- Hill, Andrew; Wooden, John (2001). Be Quick—But Don't Hurry: Finding Success in the Teachings of a Lifetime. Simon & Schuster. ISBN 978-0743213882.
