= CBS Productions =

Production arm of American CBS television network

CBS Productions, Inc.
- Final logo, used from 1997 to 2019.
- Formerly: CBS Television Network, Inc. (on-screen credit; 1952–1984)
- Type: Subsidiary
- Industry: Television production
- Founded: 1952; 74 years ago
- Defunct: November 28, 2019; 6 years ago
- Fate: Merged into Paramount Network Television (original); Folded into CBS Television Studios, Inc. (first and second revivals)
- Successors: Paramount Television (original); CBS Studios (first and second revivals)
- Headquarters: CBS Studio Center, Los Angeles, California, United States
- Parent: CBS (1952–2004); Paramount Network Television, Inc. (2004–2006); CBS Television Studios (2006–2018); CBS Entertainment Group (2018–2019)

CBS Productions, Inc. was a production arm of the CBS television network formed in 1952 to produce shows in-house, instead of relying solely on outside productions. One of its first productions was Studio One, a drama anthology series.

Later productions of note included the original Perry Mason, The Twilight Zone, Gunsmoke, The Wild Wild West, Hawaii Five-O, Rescue 911, Touched by an Angel, Walker, Texas Ranger, The King of Queens, and the CSI franchise as well as season 1 of 90210.

== History ==
Prior to 1984, CBS Productions, Inc. was credited in its entertainment programs in the ending scroll merely as CBS Television Network. In 1979, CBS struck a deal with Trident Television Associates to bring the telemovies for off-net syndication.

Distribution rights to most CBS-produced entertainment programming, especially those that debuted prior to 1971, was acquired that year by Viacom Enterprises, the syndication unit of Viacom, which was created to corporate spin-off CBS's domestic syndication and cable television operations due to Financial Interest and Syndication Rules being upheld in 1971 (later repealed in 1993). CBS retained ownership of these programs (including the rights to release them for other media forms, such as VHS videotapes and later in DVD discs) with at least one exception—the Terrytoons library, which was acquired by Viacom with the split, as CBS saw no value in the cartoons.

By 1987, CBS launched a sister production unit to CBS Productions, CBS Entertainment Productions, Inc., to produce shows, for several projects, including networks, syndication, theatrical feature and global film distribution, while continuing CBS Productions's production slate, which was producing television movies into the studio. In 1986, Ridley Scott, who was a successful feature film director, signed a deal with CBS Entertainment to deliver a made-for-TV movie that did not make it to air. In 1988, Maddy Horne, who was senior director was promoted to vice president of current programs at the CBS Entertainment studio.

In 1987, CBS announced that they would produce 22 in-house productions by November 15, 1990, although the production factory is unlikely and the time is when the curtain comes down on the consent decree that the Big Three networks through the Justice Department, an agreement that limits the number of television productions in-house.

From 1991 though 1996, Andy Hill was the president of CBS Productions, leading the development and production of programming owned by the network. He oversaw some of the most successful prime time shows of the decade, including Touched by an Angel; Caroline in the City; Dr. Quinn, Medicine Woman; Walker, Texas Ranger; Dave's World; and Rescue 911. With other romantic comedy options in the works, CBS' programming department passed on Caroline in the City. However, Hill was convinced it was a hit program, and found a buyer for the show in NBC. It was the first series that NBC had bought from a rival network, as well as the first one that CBS had sold to a competitor. Hill called NBC's decision "the most important statement CBS Productions has ever made about our legitimacy in this business." In 1996, Hill asked to be released from his CBS contract to join MCA Inc., but his boss—CBS Entertainment President Les Moonves—refused. However, Hill left CBS the following year.

In 1995, veteran producer Steven Bochco signed a deal with CBS in order to maintain the programming for five years, until 2000. In 1999, Maria Crenna joined the company as executive vice president of the studio. In 1998, although CBS retained production on the Ann-Margret drama Four Corners, Columbia TriStar Television sold off its interest to Rysher Entertainment.

Viacom and CBS rejoined in 2000 with Viacom's acquisition of CBS itself. In 2004, CBS Entertainment Productions, Inc. merged with Paramount Network Television, Inc. to become a new incarnation of the latter. CBS Productions ceased to exist by merging it completely into Paramount Network Television, though converting CBS Productions into an in-name only unit of the studio; while the CBS Productions logo was used on existing CBS-produced shows, newer CBS shows would use that of Paramount.

In January 2006, as a result of the splitting of CBS and Viacom back into separate companies, Paramount Television, Inc. would later be renamed to CBS Paramount Television, Inc. to reflect the split, whose main production division, CBS Paramount Network Television, Inc., continued to produce the former CBS Productions shows that were still running. Later on September 26, 2006, CBS Paramount Domestic Television, Inc., CBS Paramount International Television, CBS Home Entertainment, and King World, Inc. (established 1964, acquired by CBS in 1999) were combined to form CBS Television Distribution. Even though most new shows carried the CBS Paramount Television or CBS Television Studios logos, the CBS Productions logo was continued to be used on specials of The Thanksgiving Parade on CBS until November 28, 2019, when newer Thanksgiving Parade specials from 2020 onwards carried the CBS Studios logo.

On July 15, 2008, after becoming defunct in 2004, the CBS Productions logo was used on newer shows as a legacy credit, starting with episodes of the television series The Cleaner on A&E and 90210 on The CW television network, though it was technically produced by CBS Paramount Network Television. 90210 was the first series produced by the resurrected CBS Productions name. Its logo was also used on Hawaii Five-0, The Good Wife, 90210 and Blue Bloods for a brief period of time, as well as newer shows airing on CBS and The CW, although it was technically produced by CBS Television Studios. The legacy CBS Productions logo was dropped in 2012, and it was replaced by the CBS Television Studios logo.

On March 4, 2015, the CBS Productions logo was used to appear on CSI: Cyber globally as a legacy credit to honor the entire franchise, but the logo was dropped when the show was cancelled, and all future CBS shows would carry the CBS Television Studios logo. Subsequently, CBS Productions became part of ViacomCBS (later Paramount Global and currently known as Skydance Corporation) when CBS Corporation re-merged with Viacom on December 4, 2019.
