= Terry Schofield =

American basketball player and coach

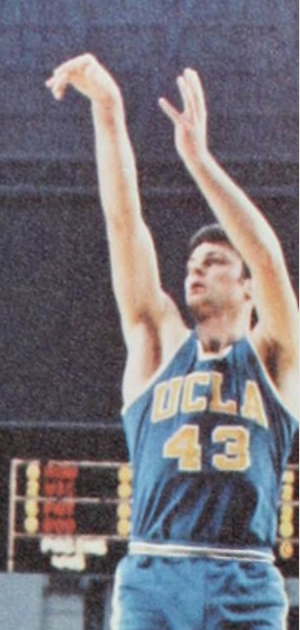
- Schofield in the championship game of the 1971 NCAA Tournament

Personal information
- Born: June 16, 1948 (age 78) Los Angeles, California, U.S.
- Listed height: 6 ft 3 in (1.91 m)

Career information
- High school: Saint Monica (Santa Monica, California)
- College: Santa Monica (1966–1967); UCLA (1968–1971)
- NBA draft: 1971: undrafted
- Position: Guard

Career highlights
- As player: Basketball Bundesliga Top Scorer (1974); 3× NCAA champion (1969–1971)

George Terence Schofield (born June 16, 1948) is an American former basketball player and coach. He played college basketball with the UCLA Bruins, winning three national championships (1969–1971) under Coach John Wooden. Schofield played professionally in Germany, where he later became a basketball coach. He also became an English lecturer for a German university.

== Early life ==
Schofield was born in Los Angeles, and began playing organized basketball in the fifth grade. He attended Saint Monica Catholic High School in Santa Monica, California, where he was a three-time All-Bay Area first team selection, named to the all-league first team twice, awarded the league's Most Valuable Player, and was also first-team all-California Interscholastic Federation (CIF).

== College career ==
Schofield enrolled at Santa Monica City College, where he led the Metropolitan Conference in scoring as a freshman in 1966–67 after averaging 21 points per game. The following year, he transferred to the University of California, Los Angeles (UCLA), where he was on their non-playing squad for a year.

As a sophomore in 1968–69, he was expected to start for the Bruins. However, he was beaten out by John Vallely, another junior college transfer, though Schofield was the better shooter. The move left him unhappy for two years. After Vallely graduated, Coach John Wooden opted to promote Kenny Booker to start over Schofield in 1970–71. The coach felt Booker was slightly better on defense and would be a better fit with the other starters. Schofield became the top guard off the bench, and served as the team's sixth man. He averaged 6.2 points and 2.4 rebounds as UCLA finished 29–1 and captured their seventh National Collegiate Athletic Association (NCAA) championship in eight seasons. It was Schofield's third straight title with the Bruins (1969–1971); he is one of 14 players who won three national titles at UCLA under Wooden.

== Professional career ==
At the urging of former UCLA teammate John Ecker, Schofield went to Germany to play professionally. Playing for SSC Göttingen in the Basketball Bundesliga (BBL), he had a career-high 52 points in 1974. He later became a coach in Germany. He led Göttingen to BBL titles in 1980, 1983, and 1984; he has also coached TTL Bamberg. Starting in 1980, Schofield coached the German national team. He also became an English lecturer at the University of Göttingen.
