= Old Milwaukee =

Brand of American dry lager

Old Milwaukee Beer
- Type: American-style lager
- Manufacturer: Pabst Brewing Company
- Introduced: 1934; 92 years ago
- Alcohol by volume: 4.9%
- Website: oldmilwaukee.com

Old Milwaukee is a brand of American dry lager owned by the Pabst Brewing Company. The brand currently consists of four different brews: Old Milwaukee Ice, Old Milwaukee Lager, Old Milwaukee Light, and Old Milwaukee Non-Alcoholic. Old Milwaukee is brewed throughout the United States and various packages are currently distributed in all 50 U.S. states, many Canadian provinces, and in select international markets.

== History ==
Old Milwaukee Beer was first brewed in the 1930s as a value-priced beer by the Joseph Schlitz Brewing Company. It was discontinued in 1942 following grain shortages caused by World War II, but reintroduced in January 1959. In 1982, the Schlitz Brewing Company and the Old Milwaukee brand were acquired by Stroh Brewery Company of Detroit. In 2000, Stroh's and all of its beer brands and recipes were acquired by Pabst Brewing Company, where the brand currently resides.

Canada is one exception: in 1999, Sleeman Breweries of Guelph, Ontario (a division of Sapporo Breweries) acquired Stroh Canada, becoming the Canadian manufacturer and distributor of Old Milwaukee. The purchase doubled Sleeman's volumes, although the Old Milwaukee brand competes on lower margins than premium beers.

== Accolades ==
All three Old Milwaukee brews have won top honors at the Great American Beer Festival and the World Beer Cup.

Old Milwaukee Light was awarded the Gold medal in the category American-Style Light Lager at the 2008 World Beer Cup.

All three brews have won numerous awards at the Great American Brew Festival including:

=== Old Milwaukee Lager ===
- 1997 GABF – American-Style Lager – Bronze
- 1998 GABF – American-Style Lager – Silver
- 1999 GABF – American-Style Lager – Gold
- 2003 GABF – American Style Lager – Gold
- 2004 GABF – American Style Lager – Gold
- 2010 GABF – American Style Lager – Silver

=== Old Milwaukee Light ===
- 1997 GABF – American-Style Light Lager – Gold
- 1999 GABF – American-Style Light Lager – Gold
- 2003 GABF – American-Style Light Lager – Bronze
- 2004 GABF – American Style Light Lager – Silver
- 2005 GABF – American Style Light Lager – Gold
- 2006 GABF – American Style Light Lager – Gold
- 2007 GABF – American Style Light Lager – Gold
- 2008 GABF – American Style Light Lager – Silver
- 2011 GABF – American Style Light Lager – Gold

=== Old Milwaukee NA ===
- 1995 GABF Non-Alcoholic Malt Beverage – Bronze
- 1999 GABF – Non-Alcoholic Malt Beverage – Gold
- 2002 GABF – Non-Alcoholic Malt Beverage – Silver
- 2004 GABF – Non-Alcoholic Malt Beverage – Gold

== Advertising ==
In 1991, Old Milwaukee ran TV ads featuring the fictional "Swedish Bikini Team".

In 2013, Will Ferrell recorded a series of ads for the company.

In 2014, Old Milwaukee teamed up with the Packard Brothers to create the Pass Me a Beer series. The latest release features Nick Packard and Tim Higgins completing challenging and comedic beer tosses for the Pass Me a Beer Summer Finale.

== Alcohol content ==
| Type | % ABV |
|---|---|
| Old Milwaukee Lager | 4.9 |
| Old Milwaukee Light | 3.8 |
| Old Milwaukee Non-Alcoholic | < 0.5 |
