= Stephen Silberkraus =

American politician (born 1981)

Stephen Hayward Silberkraus
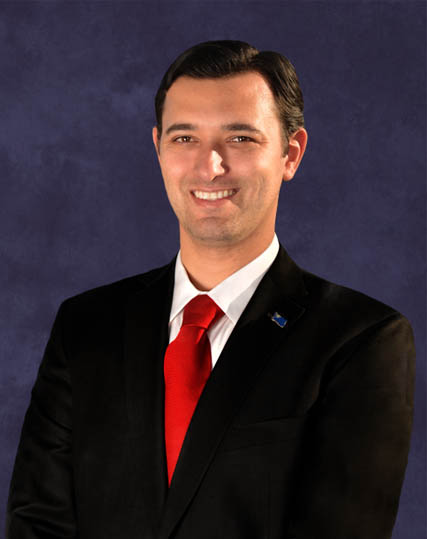

State Assemblyman District 29

Member of the Nevada Assembly from the 29th district
- In office 2014–2016
- Preceded by: Lesley Cohen
- Succeeded by: Lesley Cohen

Personal details
- Born: April 4, 1981 (age 45) Santa Monica, California,
- Party: Republican
- Education: University of California, Santa Barbara
- Profession: Multimedia professional and author
- Website: Official website

Stephen Silberkraus (born April 4, 1981) is a Republican former Nevada Assemblyman representing District 29, which covers Green Valley and downtown Henderson. Silberkraus received nearly 55% of the vote in the 2014 general election defeating Democratic appointed incumbent Lesley Cohen by 9.5%. Cohen regained the seat in the 2016 general election, defeating Silberkraus by 0.74%.

Stephen Silberkraus ran in the 2020 election cycle for the Nevada System of Higher Education Board of Regents in District 3. The Board of Regents is a state government unit in Nevada that oversees its public system of colleges and universities. These include two doctoral-granting research universities, one state college, four community colleges, and one research institute comprise the system.

Silberkraus is a multimedia professional and published author. His most recent publication is "The Space Shuttle Endeavour" by Arcadia Publishing. Silberkraus has appeared as an extra in numerous television shows and movies, including The West Wing, Entourage, and Buffy the Vampire Slayer.
