= BusRadio =

American company

BusRadio was an American company established in 2004, with the goal of providing several services to school buses, their drivers and passengers. It was envisioned that the service would transmit music, original programming, public service announcements (PSAs) and paid commercials to school children travelling on school buses in selected school districts. BusRadio was based in Needham, Massachusetts.

Programming was broadcast to the buses via a proprietary radio unit, which downloads BusRadio programming. Other features on the radio unit include GPS, driver panic buttons connected to local emergency services, and internal and external PA systems.

The Busradio service is not unlike similar services used at retail chains, such as Muzak, PlayNetwork and the In-Store Broadcasting Network.

On September 28, 2009, BusRadio announced that it would close. At its peak, Busradio enlisted up to 300 school districts and 10,000 buses in 24 states.

== Programming ==
BusRadio produced four groups of eight hours of original programming—for elementary, middle and high school levels, plus a field trip service designed for mixed groups of all ages. The flagship show, The Mat and Lucia show, was hosted by veteran broadcasters Mat Blades and Lucia Nazzaro. The Mat and Lucia show and the differing styles of audio programming were also intended to reduce rowdy behavior among students. At night, fresh programming for the next school day was downloaded to the BusRadio units.

In an average hour of BusRadio content, 52 minutes were original programming. The playlist was a mix of pop, rock, country music and urban contemporary songs, edited for the appropriate age groups. BusRadio's music standards claim to be more restrictive than traditional broadcast radio, in which they eliminate all inappropriate lyrics and subject matter to comply with their strict age-appropriateness guidelines.

Programming content, including music and safety messages, was customised for each school district. Districts were also given a say in what songs or messages should be included.

BusRadio conducted occasional contests; one example included Give A Gift, Get A Gift, a December 2007 Holiday contest where students were asked to describe which gift they were most excited to give and whom it was for. Two winners received laptop computers, and charities of their choice were given $200.

== Advertising and public service announcements ==
BusRadio partnered with non-profit organizations to bring PSAs to kids and to reinforce the missions of these organizations. An average of four minutes of every hour of programming was devoted to PSAs and bus safety tips from these and other partners:

- City Year
- Students Against Destructive Decisions
- President's Council on Physical Fitness and Sports
- Take Pride in America
- Stand Up for Kids
- National Eating Disorders Association
- Afterschool Alliance
- Do Something
- KaBoom
- Ad Council
- National Association of Pupil Transportation
- National Association of State Directors of Pupil Transportation Services

BusRadio included an average of four minutes per hour of paid commercials appropriate for the particular age group. The company encouraged its sponsors to deliver "positive, socially responsible" messages and the company actively sought partnerships with sports and activity-related companies, as well as companies that provide healthy food and drink alternatives. BusRadio claims advertisers for products contrary to the healthy lifestyle mission, such as fast food chains, were not welcome to advertise on BusRadio.

All messages were subject to the strict content guidelines developed by BusRadio’s independent content review board and were carefully reviewed for "age appropriate" content and subject matter.

== Criticism and opposition ==
Advocacy groups charged that BusRadio exploited a captive audience, exposed children to unwanted advertising, aired content inappropriate for children, and refused to disclose information to parents about its advertisers and programming. In part because of concerns about BusRadio, South Carolina State Senator W. Greg Ryberg introduced legislation in February 2008 that would ban advertising on school buses in the state.

In May 2009, the Campaign for a Commercial-Free Childhood requested Congress to examine the music and advertisements featured on BusRadio for their appropriateness and effect on students and bus drivers. In September 2009, the Federal Communications Commission released a report stating that BusRadio was not within FCC jurisdiction as a service that did not use public airwaves, and that the decision to use BusRadio was up to the local or state school boards.

=== Advertising ===
Despite BusRadio's stating that they work exclusively with socially responsible sponsors, 46 advocacy groups sent a letter in September, 2006 urging national advertisers not to do business with BusRadio or Channel One News.

The National Parent-Teacher Association specifically objected to lack of control on the part of the school district over selection of music and advertisements, despite BusRadio expressly offering this type of control and personalization.

The Campaign for a Commercial-Free Childhood also targeted Sigma Partners, BusRadio's venture capital firm. In a report, CCFC identified advertisements for Bratz, Answers.com, Cingular, and The WB, claiming their ad copy was 'harmful to children'.

=== Privacy and secrecy ===
BusRadio emphasized that members of the website were not permitted to give information that could identify them in real life and are not allowed to make this information part of their website profile, per COPPA guidelines. Despite this, critics asked for disclosures of any information collected by the website, along with overall screening of music content.

== See also ==
- Channel One News
