= 1971–72 NCAA University Division men's basketball rankings =

Basketball rankings of 1971–72 NCAA

- Season: 1971–72
- NCAA Tournament: 1972
- Preseason No. 1: UCLA
- NCAA Tournament Champions: UCLA
NCAA University Division men's basketball rankings


The 1971–72 NCAA University Division men's basketball rankings was made up of two human polls, the AP Poll and the Coaches Poll, in addition to various other preseason polls.

== Legend ==
	Increase in ranking
	Decrease in ranking
	New to rankings from previous week
Italics	Number of first place votes
(#–#)	Win–loss record
т	Tied with team above or below also with this symbol

== AP Poll ==
	Preseason	Week 1 Dec. 6	Week 2 Dec. 13	Week 3 Dec. 20	Week 4 Dec. 27	Week 5 Jan. 3	Week 6 Jan. 10	Week 7 Jan. 17	Week 8 Jan. 24	Week 9 Jan. 31	Week 10 Feb. 7	Week 11 Feb. 14	Week 12 Feb. 21	Week 13 Feb. 28	Week 14 Mar. 6	Final Mar. 13	
1.	UCLA	UCLA (2–0)	UCLA (4–0)	UCLA (4–0)	UCLA (6–0)	UCLA (8–0)	UCLA (10–0)	UCLA (12–0)	UCLA (14–0)	UCLA (16–0)	UCLA (17–0)	UCLA (19–0)	UCLA (20–0)	UCLA (23–0)	UCLA (25–0)	UCLA (26–0)	1.
2.	North Carolina	Marquette (2–0)	Marquette (4–0)	Marquette (5–0)	Marquette (6–0)	Marquette (8–0)	Marquette (10–0)	Marquette (12–0)	Marquette (14–0)	Marquette (16–0)	Marquette (17–0)	Marquette (19–0)	Marquette (22–0)	Louisville (20–2)	Penn (23–2)	North Carolina (23–4)	2.
3.	USC	North Carolina (2–0)	South Carolina (4–0)	South Carolina (4–0)	South Carolina (5–0)	North Carolina (8–1)	North Carolina (9–1)	North Carolina (11–1)	Louisville (12–1)	Louisville (15–1)	North Carolina (16–2)	North Carolina (17–2)	Louisville (19–2)	North Carolina (20–3)	North Carolina (21–4)	Penn (23–2)	3.
4.	Marquette	Ohio State (2–0)	North Carolina (3–1)	North Carolina (5–1)	North Carolina (5–1)	South Carolina (7–1)	South Carolina (7–2)	Long Beach State (14–1)	Long Beach State (15–1)	North Carolina (13–2)	Louisville (16–2)	Louisville (18–2)	Penn (18–2)	Penn (20–2)	Louisville (20–3)	Louisville (24–3)	4.
5.	Ohio State	Maryland (2–0)	Penn (4–0)	USC (5–1)	USC (6–1)	Indiana (8–1)	Louisville (9–1)	South Carolina (8–2)	North Carolina (12–2)	Long Beach State (16–1)	Penn (14–2)	Penn (16–2)	North Carolina (18–3)	Marquette (22–1)	Long Beach State (23–3)	Long Beach State (23–3)	5.
6.	Maryland	Long Beach State (2–0)	BYU (4–0)	Ohio State (4–1)	Ohio State (6–1)	Penn (7–1)	Penn (9–1)	Louisville (11–1)	Ohio State (11–2)	Penn (12–2)	Virginia (15–1)	Virginia (17–1)	Long Beach State (21–3)	Long Beach State (23–3)	South Carolina (22–4)	South Carolina (22–4)	6.
7.	Houston	Kentucky (2–0)	Kentucky (3–1)	BYU (6–1)	Indiana (6–1)	Louisville (8–1)	Long Beach State (12–1)	Ohio State (10–2)	USC (11–2)	Virginia (13–1)	Ohio State (14–3)	South Carolina (16–3)	BYU (18–3)	BYU (20–3)	Marquette (24–2)	Marquette (24–2)	7.
8.	Long Beach State	Jacksonville (2–0)	St. John's (3–1)	Indiana (5–1)	BYU (7–1)	Long Beach State (9–1)	Virginia (11–0)	USC (11–2)	Virginia (12–1)	South Carolina (12–3)	Long Beach State (18–2)	Ohio State (15–4)	Marshall (21–2)	South Carolina (19–4)	BYU (20–4)	Southwestern Louisiana (24–3)	8.
9.	Louisville	Michigan (2–0)	Florida State (5–0)	Long Beach State (5–1)	St. John's (7–1)	Virginia (9–0)	Ohio State (9–2)	Virginia (12–1)	Penn (10–2)	Ohio State (12–3)	South Carolina (16–3)	Long Beach State (19–3)	South Carolina (17–4)	Marshall (22–2)	Southwestern Louisiana (23–3)	BYU (21–5)	9.
10.	Kentucky	Penn (2–0)	Ohio State (3–1)	St. John's (5–1)	Long Beach State (7–1)	Ohio State (7–2)	USC (9–2)	Penn (9–2)	Florida State (15–2)	BYU (14–2)	BYU (16–2)	Marshall (19–2)	Southwestern Louisiana (20–2)	Florida State (23–4)	Marshall (23–3)	Florida State (24–5)	10.
11.	Jacksonville	South Carolina (1–0)	USC (3–1)	Kentucky (5–2)	Virginia (7–0)	USC (7–2)	Villanova (10–1)	Florida State (13–2)	South Carolina (10–3)	Marshall (15–2)	Marshall (17–2)	BYU (17–3)	Florida State (21–4)	Southwestern Louisiana (22–3)	Memphis State (21–5)	Minnesota (17–6)	11.
12.	South Carolina	Houston (2–1)	Indiana (4–0)	Southwestern Louisiana (4–1)	Kentucky (5–2)	Maryland (8–1)	Florida State (11–2)	Southwestern Louisiana (11–1)	Southwestern Louisiana (12–1)	Florida State (16–3)	Providence (14–2)	Southwestern Louisiana (17–2)	Maryland (17–3)	Virginia (20–4)	Hawaii (24–2)	Marshall (23–4)	12.
13.	Michigan	USC (1–1)	Long Beach State (3–0)	Penn (4–1)	Southwestern Louisiana (4–1)	Marshall (9–1)	Southwestern Louisiana (8–1)	BYU (11–2)	BYU (12–2)	Southwestern Louisiana (13–2)	Southwestern Louisiana (14–2)	Providence (14–2)	Virginia (18–3)	Houston (19–5)	Maryland (21–4)	Memphis State (21–6)	13.
14.	Kansas	St. John's (1–0)	Jacksonville (4–1)	Florida State (5–1)	Penn (5–1)	Villanova (9–1)	BYU (10–2)	Princeton (14–2)	Marshall (14–2)	Hawaii (17–1)	Florida State (17–4)	Florida State (19–4)	Missouri (19–3)	Ohio State (16–5)	Florida State (23–5)	Maryland (23–5)	14.
15.	Penn	BYU (2–0)	Maryland (2–1)	Maryland (4–1)	Louisville (5–1)	Southwestern Louisiana (5–1)	Kentucky (8–2)	Villanova (11–2)	Hawaii (15–1)	Missouri (14–2)	Memphis State (14–4)	Missouri (17–3)	Ohio State (15–5)	Hawaii (24–2)	Virginia (20–5)	Villanova (19–6)	15.
16.	New Mexico	Louisville (1–1)	Southwestern Louisiana (4–1)	Jacksonville (5–1)	Maryland (6–1)	Hawaii (9–0)	Illinois (9–1)	Marshall (12–2)	Minnesota (10–3)	Providence (13–2)	Jacksonville (14–2)	Hawaii (20–2)	Houston (17–5)	Michigan (13–7)	Minnesota (16–6)	Oral Roberts (25–1)	16.
17.	St. John's	Arizona State (2–0)	Louisville (3–1)	Ohio (3–1)	Marshall (7–0)	St. John's (8–2)	Indiana (8–3)	Minnesota (8–3)	Princeton (14–3)	Jacksonville (12–2)	Missouri (15–3)	Kentucky (15–4)	Hawaii (22–2)	Oral Roberts (22–1)	Oral Roberts (24–1)	Indiana (17–7)	17.
18.	Villanova	Florida State (2–0) т	Princeton (3–1)	Virginia (5–0)	Hawaii (6–0)	BYU (8–2)	Missouri (11–1)	Hawaii (13–1)	Maryland (11–2)	USC (11–5)	Hawaii (18–2)	Memphis State (15–5)	Kentucky (17–4)	Maryland (18–4)	Missouri (21–4)	Kentucky (20–6)	18.
19.	BYU	Villanova (2–1) т	Virginia (4–0)	Louisville (3–1)	West Virginia (5–0)	Kentucky (7–2)	Hawaii (10–1)	Tennessee (8–2)	Northern Illinois (10–1)	Minnesota (11–4)	Minnesota (12–4)	Maryland (16–3)	Memphis State (17–5)	Missouri (19–4)	Houston (20–6)	Ohio State (18–6)	19.
20.	Oklahoma	NC State (2–0)	Houston (3–2)	Marshall (6–0)	Tennessee (3–1)	Florida State (8–2)	Marshall (10–2)	Northern Illinois (10–1)	Missouri (13–2)	Michigan (10–6)	Duquesne (14–2)	Tennessee (13–4)	Oral Roberts (20–1)	Memphis State (19–5)	Indiana (15–7)	Virginia (21–6)	20.
	Preseason	Week 1 Dec. 6	Week 2 Dec. 13	Week 3 Dec. 20	Week 4 Dec. 27	Week 5 Jan. 3	Week 6 Jan. 10	Week 7 Jan. 17	Week 8 Jan. 24	Week 9 Jan. 31	Week 10 Feb. 7	Week 11 Feb. 14	Week 12 Feb. 21	Week 13 Feb. 28	Week 14 Mar. 6	Final Mar. 13	
		Dropped: Kansas; New Mexico; Oklahoma	Dropped: Michigan; Arizona State; Villanova; NC State (3–1)	Dropped: Princeton; Houston	Dropped: Florida State (5–2); Jacksonville (5–1); Ohio	Dropped: West Virginia; Tennessee	Dropped: Maryland (9–2); St. John's	Dropped: Kentucky; Illinois; Indiana; Missouri (12–2)	Dropped: Villanova; Tennessee	Dropped: Princeton; Maryland; Northern Illinois	Dropped: USC; Michigan	Dropped: Jacksonville; Minnesota; Duquesne	Dropped: Providence (16–4); Tennessee	Dropped: Kentucky	Dropped: Ohio State; Michigan	Dropped: Hawaii; Missouri (21–5); Houston	

== Coaches Poll ==
	Preseason	Week 1 Dec. 7	Week 2 Dec. 14	Week 3 Dec. 21	Week 4 Dec. 28	Week 5 Jan. 4	Week 6 Jan. 11	Week 7 Jan. 18	Week 8 Jan. 25	Week 9 Feb. 1	Week 10 Feb. 8	Week 11 Feb. 15	Week 12 Feb. 22	Week 13 Feb. 29	Week 14 Mar. 7	Final Mar. 14	
1.	UCLA	UCLA (2–0)	UCLA (4–0)	UCLA (4–0)	UCLA (6–0)	UCLA (8–0)	UCLA (10–0)	UCLA (12–0)	UCLA (14–0)	UCLA (16–0)	UCLA (17–0)	UCLA (19–0)	UCLA (20–0)	UCLA (23–0)	UCLA (25–0)	UCLA (26–0)	1.
2.	Marquette	North Carolina (2–0)	Marquette (4–0)	Marquette (5–0)	Marquette (6–0)	Marquette (8–0)	Marquette (10–0)	Marquette (12–0)	Marquette (14–0)	Marquette (16–0)	Marquette (17–0)	Marquette (19–0)	Marquette (22–0)	North Carolina (20–3)	North Carolina (21–4)	North Carolina (23–4)	2.
3.	USC	Marquette (2–0)	South Carolina (4–0)	South Carolina (4–0)	South Carolina (5–0)	North Carolina (8–1)	North Carolina (9–1)	North Carolina (11–1)	Louisville (12–1)	Louisville (15–1)	North Carolina (16–2)	North Carolina (17–2)	North Carolina (18–3)	Louisville (20–2)	Penn (23–2)	Penn (23–2)	3.
4.	North Carolina	Ohio State (2–0)	BYU (4–0)	North Carolina (5–1)	North Carolina (5–1)	South Carolina (7–1)	South Carolina (7–2)	South Carolina (8–2)	Long Beach State (15–1)	North Carolina (13–2)	Louisville (16–2)	South Carolina (16–3)	Penn (18–2)	Penn (20–2)	South Carolina (22–4)	Louisville (24–3)	4.
5.	Ohio State	Maryland (2–0)	North Carolina (3–1)	USC (5–1)	USC (6–1)	Indiana (8–1)	Penn (9–1)	Louisville (11–1)	North Carolina (12–2)	Long Beach State (16–1)	Penn (14–2)	Penn (16–2)	Louisville (19–2)	Marquette (22–1)	Long Beach State (23–3)	South Carolina (22–4)	5.
6.	Houston	Kentucky (2–0)	St. John's (3–1)	Ohio State (4–1)	Ohio State (6–1)	Louisville (8–1)	Louisville (9–1)	Long Beach State (14–1) т	Ohio State (11–2)	South Carolina (12–3)	South Carolina (16–3)	Louisville (18–2)	Long Beach State (21–3)	South Carolina (19–4)	Louisville (20–3)	Long Beach State (23–3)	6.
7.	Maryland	Long Beach State (2–0)	Ohio State (3–1)	Long Beach State (5–1)	Indiana (6–1)	Penn (7–1)	Long Beach State (12–1)	Ohio State (10–2) т	USC (11–2)	Penn (12–2)	Ohio State (14–3)	Virginia (17–1)	BYU (18–3) т	BYU (20–3)	Marquette (24–2)	Marquette (24–2)	7.
8.	Louisville	South Carolina (1–0)	USC (3–1)	Indiana (5–1)	St. John's (7–1)	Long Beach State (9–1)	Ohio State (9–2)	USC (11–2)	South Carolina (10–3)	Ohio State (12–3)	Long Beach State (18–2)	Long Beach State (19–3)	South Carolina (17–4) т	Long Beach State (23–3)	BYU (20–4)	Southwestern Louisiana (24–3)	8.
9.	Long Beach State	Michigan (2–0)	Penn (4–0)	St. John's (5–1)	BYU (7–1)	Ohio State (7–2)	Virginia (11–0)	Penn (9–2)	Penn (10–2)	Virginia (13–1)	Virginia (15–1)	Ohio State (15–4)	Missouri (19–3)	Virginia (20–4)	Memphis State (21–5)	BYU (21–5)	9.
10.	Kentucky	Houston (2–1)	Indiana (4–0)	Southwestern Louisiana (4–1)	Long Beach State (7–1)	Maryland (8–1)	USC (9–2)	Florida State (13–2)	Florida State (15–2)	BYU (14–2)	BYU (16–2)	BYU (17–3)	Virginia (18–3)	Marshall (22–2)	Marshall (23–3)	Florida State (24–5)	10.
11.	Jacksonville	Jacksonville (2–0)	Kentucky (3–1)	BYU (6–1)	Southwestern Louisiana (4–1)	USC (7–2)	Missouri (11–1)	Virginia (12–1)	Virginia (12–1)	Florida State (16–3)	Southwestern Louisiana (14–2)	Florida State (19–4)	Maryland (17–3)	Florida State (23–4)	Southwestern Louisiana (23–3)	Maryland (23–5)	11.
12.	New Mexico State	USC (1–1)	Southwestern Louisiana (4–1)	Florida State (5–1)	Hawaii (6–0)	Florida State (8–2)	Florida State (11–2)	Southwestern Louisiana (11–1)	Southwestern Louisiana (12–1)	Missouri (14–2)	Florida State (17–4)	Missouri (17–3)	Southwestern Louisiana (20–2)	Southwestern Louisiana (22–3)	Missouri (21–4)	Minnesota (17–6)	12.
13.	South Carolina	St. John's (1–0)	Florida State (5–0)	Maryland (4–1)	Louisville (5–1)	St. John's (8–2)	Villanova (10–1)	Princeton (14–2)	BYU (12–2)	Southwestern Louisiana (13–2)	Providence (14–2)	Southwestern Louisiana (17–2)	Florida State (21–4)	Maryland (18–4)	Hawaii (24–2)	Memphis State (21–6)	13.
14.	BYU	BYU (2–0)	Arizona State (4–1)	Kentucky (5–2)	Maryland (6–1)	Hawaii (9–0)	Illinois (9–1)	BYU (11–2)	Minnesota (10–3)	Providence (13–2)	Kentucky (13–4)	Maryland (16–3)	Ohio State (15–5)	Houston (19–5)	Maryland (21–4)	Kentucky (20–6)	14.
15.	St. John's	Penn (2–0)	Maryland (2–1)	Ohio (3–1)	Kentucky (5–2)	Villanova (9–1) т	BYU (10–2)	Maryland (10–2)	Missouri (13–2)	Hawaii (17–1)	Missouri (15–3)	Providence (14–2)	Kentucky (17–4)	Ohio State (16–5) т	Houston (20–6)	Villanova (19–6)	15.
16.	Kansas	Minnesota (2–0)	Long Beach State (3–0)	Louisville (3–1)	Jacksonville (5–1)	Kentucky (7–2) т	Southwestern Louisiana (8–1)	Villanova (11–2)	Maryland (11–2)	Marshall (15–2)	Marshall (17–2)	Marshall (19–2)	Marshall (21–2)	Michigan (13–7) т	Minnesota (16–6)	Kansas State (18–8)	16.
17.	Villanova	Arizona State (2–0)	Louisville (3–1)	Arizona State (5–2)	Florida State (5–2)	Southwestern Louisiana (5–1)	Duquesne (8–0)	Hawaii (13–1)	Princeton (14–3)	Jacksonville (12–2)	Hawaii (18–2) т	Hawaii (20–2)	Houston (17–5)	Memphis State (19–5)	UTEP (20–5)	UTEP (20–6)	17.
18.	Michigan	Kansas (1–1)	Princeton (3–1)	Minnesota (3–1)	Villanova (6–1)	Virginia (9–0)	Kentucky (8–2)	Minnesota (8–3) т	Marshall (14–2)	UTEP (15–3)	Maryland (14–3) т	Kentucky (15–4)	Hawaii (22–2)	Detroit (17–5)	Virginia (20–5)	Marshall (23–4)	18.
19.	Harvard	Villanova (2–1)	NC State (3–1)	Penn (4–1) т	Penn (5–1)	Missouri (10–1)	UTEP (11–2)	Tennessee (8–2) т	Hawaii (15–1) т	Washington (13–3)	Villanova (13–5) т	Houston (14–5) т	Providence (16–4) т	Missouri (19–4)	Providence (19–5)	Missouri (21–5) т	19.
20.	Pacific	NC State (2–0)	Saint Louis (3–1)	Jacksonville (5–1) т	Arizona State (6–2)	BYU (8–2)	Maryland (9–2)	Missouri (12–2) т	Fordham (10–4) т	Minnesota (11–4)	Washington (14–3) т	Saint Joseph's (15–4) т	Toledo (16–4) т	Duquesne (18–4)	Temple (23–7)	Weber State (17–9) т	20.
	Preseason	Week 1 Dec. 7	Week 2 Dec. 14	Week 3 Dec. 21	Week 4 Dec. 28	Week 5 Jan. 4	Week 6 Jan. 11	Week 7 Jan. 18	Week 8 Jan. 25	Week 9 Feb. 1	Week 10 Feb. 8	Week 11 Feb. 15	Week 12 Feb. 22	Week 13 Feb. 29	Week 14 Mar. 7	Final Mar. 14	
		Dropped: Louisville; New Mexico State; Harvard; Pacific	Dropped: Michigan; Houston (3–2); Jacksonville (3–1); Minnesota; Kansas; Villanova	Dropped: Princeton; NC State; Saint Louis	Dropped: Ohio; Minnesota	Dropped: Jacksonville; Arizona State	Dropped: Indiana; St. John's; Hawaii	Dropped: Illinois; Duquesne; Kentucky; UTEP	Dropped: Villanova; Tennessee	Dropped: USC; Maryland; Princeton; Fordham	Dropped: Jacksonville; UTEP; Minnesota	Dropped: Villanova; Washington	Dropped: Saint Joseph's	Dropped: Kentucky; Hawaii; Providence; Toledo	Dropped: Florida State; Ohio State; Michigan; Detroit; Duquesne	Dropped: Hawaii; Houston; Virginia (21–6); Providence; Temple	
