= 1971–72 NCAA University Division men's basketball season =

Men's collegiate basketball season

- Preseason AP No. 1: UCLA Bruins
- NCAA Tournament: 1972
- Tournament dates: March 11 – 25, 1972
- National Championship: Los Angeles Memorial Sports Arena; Los Angeles, California
- NCAA Champions: UCLA Bruins
- Helms National Champions: UCLA Bruins
- Other champions: Maryland Terrapins (NIT)
- Player of the Year (Naismith, Wooden): Bill Walton, UCLA Bruins (Naismith)
- Player of the Year (Helms): Bill Walton, UCLA Bruins

The 1971–72 NCAA University Division men's basketball season began in December 1971, progressed through the regular season and conference tournaments, and concluded with the 1972 NCAA University Division basketball tournament championship game on March 25, 1972, at Los Angeles Memorial Sports Arena in Los Angeles, California. The UCLA Bruins won their eighth NCAA national championship with an 81–76 victory over the Florida State Seminoles.

== Season headlines ==
- At Illinois State, Will Robinson became the first African-American head coach at an NCAA University Division (now NCAA Division I) school.
- UCLA went undefeated (30–0) and won its sixth NCAA championship in a row, eighth overall, and eighth in nine seasons. In the Pacific 8 Conference, it also won its sixth of what ultimately would be 13 consecutive conference titles.
- The NCAA national championship game was played on Saturday for the last time. It moved to Monday night in 1973.

== Season outlook ==
=== Pre-season polls ===
The Top 20 from the AP Poll and Coaches Poll during the pre-season.

Associated Press
Ranking	Team
1	UCLA
2	North Carolina
3	USC
4	Marquette
5	Ohio State
6	Maryland
7	Houston
8	Long Beach State
9	Louisville
10	Kentucky
11	Jacksonville
12	South Carolina
13	Michigan
14	Kansas
15	Penn
16	New Mexico
17	St. John's
18	Villanova
19	BYU
20	Oklahoma

UPI Coaches
Ranking	Team
1	UCLA
2	Marquette
3	USC
4	North Carolina
5	Ohio State
6	Houston
7	Maryland
8	Louisville
9	Long Beach State
10	Kentucky
11	Jacksonville
12	New Mexico State
13	South Carolina
14	BYU
15	St. John's
16	Kansas
17	Villanova
18	Michigan
19	Harvard
20	Pacific

== Conference membership changes ==
School	Former conference	New conference
Ball State Cardinals	non-University Division	University Division independent
Georgia Southern Eagles	non-University Division	University Division independent
Illinois State Redbirds	non-University Division	University Division independent
Indiana State Sycamores	non-University Division	University Division independent
Louisiana Tech Bulldogs	Gulf States Conference (College Division)	Southland Conference
Miami (Fla.) Hurricanes	University Division independent	Discontinued basketball program
NYU Violets	University Division independent	Discontinued basketball program
Oral Roberts Titans	non-University Division	University Division independent
Pacific Tigers	West Coast Athletic Conference	Pacific Coast Athletic Association
Seattle Redhawks	University Division independent	West Coast Athletic Conference
South Alabama Jaguars	non-University Division	University Division independent
South Carolina Gamecocks	Atlantic Coast Conference	University Division independent
Southwest Louisiana Ragin' Cajuns	Gulf States Conference (College Division)	Southland Conference
Stetson Hatters	non-University Division	University Division independent

== Regular season ==
=== Conferences ===
==== Conference winners and tournaments ====
Conference	Regular season winner	Conference player of the year	Conference tournament	Tournament venue (City)	Tournament winner
Atlantic Coast Conference	North Carolina	Barry Parkhill, Virginia	1972 ACC men's basketball tournament	Greensboro Coliseum (Greensboro, North Carolina)	North Carolina
Big Eight Conference	Kansas State	Isaac "Bud" Stallworth, Kansas	No Tournament		
Big Sky Conference	Weber State	None selected	No Tournament		
Big Ten Conference	Minnesota	None selected	No Tournament		
Ivy League	Penn	None selected	No Tournament		
Mid-American Conference	Ohio	Tom Kozelko, Toledo	No Tournament		
Middle Atlantic Conference	Temple (East); Rider (West)		No Tournament		
Missouri Valley Conference	Louisville & Memphis State	Larry Finch, Memphis State	Louisville		
Ohio Valley Conference	Eastern Kentucky, Morehead State, & Western Kentucky	Les Taylor, Murray State	No Tournament		
Pacific 8 Conference	UCLA	None selected	No Tournament		
Pacific Coast Athletic Association	Long Beach State	Ed Ratleff, Long Beach State	No Tournament		
Southeastern Conference	Kentucky & Tennessee	Mike Edwards, Tennessee, & Tom Parker, Kentucky	No Tournament		
Southern Conference	Davidson	Russ Hunt, Furman	1972 Southern Conference men's basketball tournament	Greenville Memorial Auditorium (Greenville, South Carolina) (Semifinals and Finals)	East Carolina
Southland Conference	Louisiana Tech	Dwight "Bo" Lamar, Southwest Louisiana	No Tournament		
Southwest Conference	SMU & Texas	Larry Robinson, Texas	No Tournament		
West Coast Athletic Conference	San Francisco	Mike Stewart, Santa Clara	No Tournament		
Western Athletic Conference	BYU	None selected	No Tournament		
Yankee Conference	Rhode Island	None selected	No Tournament		

==== Conference standings ====
1971–72 ACC men's basketball standings
	Conf.				Overall
Team	W		L	PCT	W		L	PCT
No. 2 North Carolina †	9	–	3	.750	26	–	5	.839
No. 14 Maryland	8	–	4	.667	27	–	5	.844
No. 20 Virginia	8	–	4	.667	21	–	7	.750
Duke	6	–	6	.500	14	–	12	.538
NC State	6	–	6	.500	16	–	10	.615
Wake Forest	3	–	9	.250	8	–	18	.308
Clemson	2	–	10	.167	10	–	16	.385
† 1972 ACC tournament winner Rankings from AP Poll

1971–72 Big Eight Conference men's basketball standings
	Conf.				Overall
Team	W		L	PCT	W		L	PCT
Kansas State	12	–	2	.857	19	–	9	.679
Missouri	10	–	4	.714	21	–	6	.778
Oklahoma	9	–	5	.643	14	–	12	.538
Nebraska	7	–	7	.500	14	–	12	.538
Kansas	7	–	7	.500	11	–	15	.423
Iowa State	5	–	9	.357	12	–	14	.462
Colorado	4	–	10	.286	7	–	19	.269
Oklahoma State	2	–	12	.143	4	–	22	.154
Rankings from AP Poll

1971–72 Big Sky men's basketball standings
	Conf.				Overall
Team	W		L	PCT	W		L	PCT
Weber State	10	–	4	.714	18	–	11	.621
Gonzaga	8	–	6	.571	14	–	12	.538
Northern Arizona	8	–	6	.571	13	–	10	.565
Idaho State	8	–	6	.571	14	–	12	.538
Montana	7	–	7	.500	14	–	11	.560
Boise State	7	–	7	.500	14	–	12	.538
Montana State	6	–	8	.429	9	–	16	.360
Idaho	2	–	12	.143	5	–	14	.263

1971–72 Big Ten Conference men's basketball standings
	Conf.				Overall
Team	W		L	PCT	W		L	PCT
No. 11 Minnesota	11	–	3	.786	17	–	6	.739
No. 19 Ohio State	10	–	4	.714	18	–	6	.750
No. 17 Indiana	9	–	5	.643	17	–	8	.680
Michigan	9	–	5	.643	14	–	10	.583
Michigan State	6	–	8	.429	13	–	11	.542
Wisconsin	6	–	8	.429	13	–	11	.542
Purdue	6	–	8	.429	12	–	12	.500
Illinois	5	–	9	.357	14	–	10	.583
Iowa	5	–	9	.357	11	–	13	.458
Northwestern	3	–	11	.214	5	–	18	.217
Rankings from AP Poll

1971–72 Ivy League men's basketball standings
	Conf.				Overall
Team	W		L	PCT	W		L	PCT
No. 3 Pennsylvania	13	–	1	.929	25	–	3	.893
Princeton	12	–	2	.857	20	–	7	.741
Harvard	8	–	6	.571	15	–	11	.577
Dartmouth	8	–	6	.571	14	–	12	.538
Brown	6	–	8	.429	10	–	16	.385
Yale	5	–	9	.357	7	–	17	.292
Columbia	3	–	11	.214	4	–	20	.167
Cornell	1	–	13	.071	5	–	19	.208
Rankings from AP Poll

1971–72 Mid-American Conference men's basketball standings
	Conf.				Overall
Team	W		L	PCT	W		L	PCT
Ohio	7	–	3	.700	15	–	11	.577
Toledo	7	–	3	.700	18	–	7	.720
Kent State	6	–	4	.600	7	–	17	.292
Western Michigan	5	–	5	.500	10	–	14	.417
Miami (Ohio)	4	–	6	.400	12	–	12	.500
Bowling Green State	1	–	9	.100	4	–	20	.167
Rankings from AP Poll

1971–72 MAC men's basketball standings
	Conf.				Overall
Team	W		L	PCT	W		L	PCT
University–Eastern
Temple †	6	–	0	1.000	23	–	8	.742
Saint Joseph's	5	–	1	.833	19	–	9	.679
American	3	–	3	.500	16	–	8	.667
Hofstra	2	–	4	.333	11	–	14	.440
Drexel	2	–	4	.333	11	–	14	.440
La Salle	2	–	4	.333	6	–	19	.240
West Chester	1	–	5	.167	9	–	16	.360
University–Western
Rider	8	–	2	.800	15	–	11	.577
Lafayette	7	–	3	.700	20	–	5	.800
Delaware	7	–	3	.700	18	–	7	.720
Lehigh	3	–	7	.300	10	–	14	.417
Bucknell	3	–	7	.300	5	–	18	.217
Gettysburg	2	–	8	.200	11	–	12	.478
† 1972 MAC men's basketball tournament winner Rankings from AP Poll

1971–72 Missouri Valley Conference men's basketball standings
	Conf.				Overall
Team	W		L	PCT	W		L	PCT
No. 4 Louisville	12	–	2	.857	26	–	5	.839
No. 13 Memphis State	12	–	2	.857	21	–	7	.750
Saint Louis	9	–	5	.643	18	–	8	.692
Bradley	8	–	6	.571	17	–	9	.654
Wichita State	6	–	8	.429	16	–	10	.615
Tulsa	5	–	9	.357	15	–	11	.577
North Texas State	2	–	12	.143	8	–	18	.308
Drake	2	–	12	.143	7	–	19	.269
New Mexico State		–		–	19	–	6	.760
West Texas State		–		–	14	–	11	.560
Rankings from AP Poll

1971–72 Ohio Valley Conference men's basketball standings
	Conf.				Overall
Team	W		L	PCT	W		L	PCT
Morehead State	9	–	5	.643	16	–	11	.593
Eastern Kentucky	9	–	5	.643	15	–	11	.577
Western Kentucky	9	–	5	.643	15	–	11	.577
Tennessee Tech	7	–	7	.500	14	–	11	.560
Murray State	6	–	8	.429	15	–	11	.577
East Tennessee State	6	–	8	.429	11	–	14	.440
Middle Tennessee	5	–	9	.357	15	–	11	.577
Austin Peay State	5	–	9	.357	10	–	14	.417
Rankings from AP Poll

1971–72 Pacific-8 Conference men's basketball standings
	Conf.				Overall
Team	W		L	PCT	W		L	PCT
No. 1 UCLA	14	–	0	1.000	30	–	0	1.000
Washington	10	–	4	.714	20	–	6	.769
Oregon State	9	–	5	.643	18	–	10	.643
USC	9	–	5	.643	16	–	10	.615
California	6	–	8	.429	13	–	16	.448
Stanford	5	–	9	.357	10	–	15	.400
Washington State	3	–	11	.214	11	–	15	.423
Oregon	0	–	14	.000	6	–	20	.231
As of April 15, 1972; Rankings from AP Poll

1971–72 Pacific Coast Athletic Association men's basketball standings
	Conf.				Overall
Team	W		L	PCT	W		L	PCT
No. 5 Long Beach State*	10	–	2	.833	25	–	4	.862
Pacific	8	–	4	.667	17	–	9	.654
San Diego State	7	–	5	.583	18	–	10	.643
UC Santa Barbara	5	–	7	.417	17	–	9	.654
Cal State Los Angeles	5	–	7	.417	14	–	12	.538
San Jose State	5	–	7	.417	11	–	15	.423
Fresno State	2	–	10	.167	9	–	17	.346
* – Overall record adjusted to 23–3; Rankings from AP Poll

1971–72 Southeastern Conference men's basketball standings
	Conf.				Overall
Team	W		L	PCT	W		L	PCT
Tennessee	14	–	4	.778	19	–	6	.760
No. 18 Kentucky	14	–	4	.778	21	–	7	.750
Alabama	13	–	5	.722	18	–	8	.692
Vanderbilt	10	–	8	.556	16	–	10	.615
Georgia	9	–	9	.500	14	–	12	.538
Ole Miss	8	–	10	.444	13	–	12	.520
Mississippi State	6	–	12	.333	13	–	13	.500
Auburn	6	–	12	.333	10	–	16	.385
LSU	6	–	12	.333	10	–	16	.385
Florida	4	–	14	.222	10	–	15	.400
Rankings from AP Poll

1971–72 Southern Conference men's basketball standings
	Conf.				Overall
Team	W		L	PCT	W		L	PCT
Davidson	8	–	2	.800	19	–	9	.679
Furman	8	–	3	.727	17	–	11	.607
William & Mary	6	–	4	.600	10	–	17	.370
East Carolina †	7	–	5	.583	14	–	15	.483
The Citadel	5	–	6	.455	12	–	13	.480
Richmond	3	–	9	.250	6	–	19	.240
VMI	2	–	10	.167	6	–	19	.240
† Southern Conference Tournament winner Rankings from AP Poll

1971–72 Southland Conference men's basketball standings
	Conf.				Overall
Team	W		L	PCT	W		L	PCT
Louisiana Tech†*	8	–	0	1.000	23	–	3	.885
Lamar**	7	–	1	.875	13	–	13	.500
Texas-Arlington	5	–	3	.625	14	–	12	.538
Arkansas State***	5	–	4	.556	12	–	14	.462
Abilene Christian	3	–	5	.375	17	–	8	.680
No. 8 Southwest Louisiana****	0	–	8	.000	23	–	3	.885
Trinity (Tex.)	0	–	8	.000	6	–	18	.250
† Regular-season championship winner * – Played as non-major program; conference record adjusted to 8–0. ** – Dispute conference record 6–2. *** – Disputed conference record 4–4. **** – Disputed record 8–0 conference, 25–4 overall. Rankings from AP Poll

1971–72 Southwest Conference men's basketball standings
	Conf.				Overall
Team	W		L	PCT	W		L	PCT
Texas	10	–	4	.714	19	–	9	.679
SMU	10	–	4	.714	16	–	11	.593
TCU	9	–	5	.643	15	–	9	.625
Texas A&M	9	–	5	.643	16	–	10	.615
Texas Tech	8	–	6	.571	14	–	12	.538
Arkansas	5	–	9	.357	8	–	18	.308
Baylor	4	–	10	.286	14	–	12	.538
Rice	1	–	13	.071	6	–	20	.231
Rankings from AP Poll

1971-72 WCAC men's basketball standings
	Conf.				Overall
Team	W		L	PCT	W		L	PCT
San Francisco	13	–	1	.929	20	–	8	.714
Santa Clara	11	–	3	.786	17	–	9	.654
Seattle	10	–	4	.714	17	–	9	.654
UNLV	8	–	6	.571	14	–	12	.538
Loyola (Calif.)	6	–	8	.429	11	–	15	.423
Pepperdine	5	–	9	.357	10	–	15	.400
Saint Mary's	3	–	11	.214	9	–	17	.346
Nevada	0	–	14	.000	2	–	24	.077
Rankings from AP Poll

1971–72 WAC men's basketball standings
	Conf.				Overall
Team	W		L	PCT	W		L	PCT
No. 9 BYU	12	–	2	.857	21	–	5	.808
UTEP	9	–	5	.643	20	–	7	.741
Arizona State	9	–	5	.643	18	–	8	.692
Colorado State	7	–	7	.500	15	–	9	.625
New Mexico	7	–	7	.500	15	–	11	.577
Utah	5	–	9	.357	13	–	12	.520
Arizona	4	–	10	.286	6	–	20	.231
Wyoming	3	–	11	.214	12	–	14	.462
Rankings from AP Poll

1971–72 Yankee Conference men's basketball standings
	Conf.				Overall
Team	W		L	PCT	W		L	PCT
Rhode Island	8	–	2	.800	15	–	11	.577
Maine	6	–	4	.600	15	–	10	.600
Massachusetts	6	–	4	.600	14	–	12	.538
New Hampshire	5	–	5	.500	14	–	9	.609
Connecticut	5	–	5	.500	8	–	17	.320
Vermont	0	–	10	.000	5	–	19	.208

=== University Division independents ===
A total of 67 college teams played as University Division independents. Among them, Oral Roberts (26–2) had the best winning percentage (.929) and Florida State (28–5) finished with the most wins.

1971–72 NCAA University Division men's basketball independents standings
	Conf.				Overall
Team	W		L	PCT	W		L	PCT
No. 16 Oral Roberts		–		–	26	–	2	.929
No. 7 Marquette		–		–	25	–	4	.862
Hawaii		–		–	23	–	4	.852
No. 12 Marshall		–		–	23	–	4	.852
No. 10 Florida State		–		–	28	–	5	.848
Northern Illinois		–		–	21	–	4	.840
No. 6 South Carolina		–		–	24	–	5	.828
Duquesne		–		–	20	–	5	.800
Syracuse		–		–	22	–	6	.786
Providence		–		–	21	–	6	.778
Detroit		–		–	18	–	6	.750
Houston		–		–	20	–	7	.741
Jacksonville		–		–	20	–	8	.714
No. 15 Villanova		–		–	20	–	8	.714
Pan American		–		–	17	–	7	.708
Niagara		–		–	21	–	9	.700
Penn State		–		–	17	–	8	.680
Fordham		–		–	18	–	9	.667
St. Bonaventure		–		–	16	–	8	.667
Cincinnati		–		–	17	–	9	.654
Georgia Southern		–		–	17	–	9	.654
Colgate		–		–	15	–	8	.652
St. John's		–		–	19	–	11	.633
Fairleigh Dickinson		–		–	15	–	9	.625
Illinois State		–		–	16	–	10	.615
Virginia Tech		–		–	16	–	10	.615
Canisius		–		–	15	–	11	.577
Creighton		–		–	15	–	11	.577
Holy Cross		–		–	15	–	11	.577
Oklahoma City		–		–	16	–	12	.571
Loyola (LA)		–		–	14	–	11	.560
Rutgers		–		–	14	–	11	.560
West Virginia		–		–	13	–	11	.542
Hardin–Simmons		–		–	14	–	12	.538
DePaul		–		–	12	–	11	.522
Centenary		–		–	13	–	12	.520
Long Island		–		–	13	–	12	.520
Boston College		–		–	13	–	13	.500
Dayton		–		–	13	–	13	.500
Pittsburgh		–		–	12	–	12	.500
Air Force		–		–	12	–	13	.480
Fairfield		–		–	12	–	13	.480
Saint Francis (PA)		–		–	12	–	13	.480
Saint Peter's		–		–	12	–	13	.480
Indiana State		–		–	12	–	14	.462
St. Francis (NY)		–		–	12	–	14	.462
Utah State		–		–	12	–	14	.462
Xavier		–		–	12	–	14	.462
Army		–		–	11	–	13	.458
Manhattan		–		–	11	–	13	.458
George Washington		–		–	11	–	14	.440
Navy		–		–	10	–	13	.435
Denver		–		–	11	–	15	.423
Portland		–		–	10	–	16	.385
Seton Hall		–		–	10	–	16	.385
Southern Illinois		–		–	10	–	16	.385
Ball State		–		–	9	–	15	.375
Loyola (IL)		–		–	8	–	14	.364
Tulane		–		–	8	–	18	.308
Boston University		–		–	7	–	16	.304
South Alabama		–		–	7	–	17	.292
Iona		–		–	6	–	17	.261
Butler		–		–	6	–	20	.231
Georgia Tech		–		–	6	–	20	.231
Notre Dame		–		–	6	–	20	.231
Stetson		–		–	6	–	20	.231
Georgetown		–		–	3	–	23	.115
Rankings from AP Poll

=== Informal championships ===
Conference	Regular season winner	Most Valuable Player
Philadelphia Big 5	Penn & Temple	Corky Calhoun, Penn, & Chris Ford, Villanova

Penn and Temple both finished with 3–1 records in head-to-head competition among the Philadelphia Big 5.

== Post-season tournaments ==
=== NCAA tournament ===
==== Final Four ====
National semifinals
E	North Carolina	75
ME	Florida State	79
MW	Louisville	77
MW	UCLA	96

National finals
ME	Florida State	76
W	UCLA	81
Third place
E	North Carolina	105
MW	Louisville	91

=== National Invitation tournament ===
==== Semifinals & finals ====
Semifinals
Jacksonville	77
Maryland	91
St. John's	67
Niagara	69

Finals
Maryland	100
Niagara	69
Third place
Jacksonville	83
St. John's	80

== Awards ==
=== Consensus All-American teams ===
Consensus First Team
Player	Position	Class	Team
Henry Bibby	G	Senior	UCLA
Jim Chones	C	Junior	Marquette
Dwight Lamar	G	Junior	Southwestern Louisiana
Bob McAdoo	F	Junior	North Carolina
Ed Ratleff	F	Junior	Long Beach State
Tom Riker	F/C	Senior	South Carolina
Bill Walton	C	Sophomore	UCLA

Consensus Second Team
Player	Position	Class	Team
Rich Fuqua	G	Junior	Oral Roberts
Barry Parkhill	G	Junior	Virginia
Jim Price	G	Senior	Louisville
Bud Stallworth	F	Senior	Kansas
Henry Wilmore	G/F	Junior	Michigan

=== Major player of the year awards ===
- Naismith Award: Bill Walton, UCLA
- Helms Player of the Year: Bill Walton, UCLA
- Associated Press Player of the Year: Bill Walton, UCLA
- UPI Player of the Year: Bill Walton, UCLA
- Oscar Robertson Trophy (USBWA): Bill Walton, UCLA
- Adolph Rupp Trophy: Bill Walton, UCLA
- Sporting News Player of the Year: Bill Walton, UCLA

=== Major coach of the year awards ===
- Associated Press Coach of the Year: John Wooden, UCLA
- Henry Iba Award (USBWA): John Wooden, UCLA
- NABC Coach of the Year: John Wooden, UCLA
- UPI Coach of the Year: John Wooden, UCLA
- Sporting News Coach of the Year: John Wooden, UCLA

=== Other major awards ===
- Frances Pomeroy Naismith Award (Best player under 6'0): Scott Martin, Oklahoma
- Robert V. Geasey Trophy (Top player in Philadelphia Big 5): Corky Calhoun, Penn, & Chris Ford, Villanova
- NIT/Haggerty Award (Top player in New York City metro area): Richie Garner, Manhattan, & Tom Sullivan, Fordham

== Coaching changes ==
A number of teams changed coaches during the season and after it ended.

Team	Former Coach	Interim Coach	New Coach	Reason
Arizona	Bruce Larson		Fred Snowden	Snowden was an assistant at Michigan.
Ball State	Bud Getchell		Jim Holstein	
Bucknell	Don Smith		Jim Valvano	
BYU	Stan Watts		Glenn Potter	
California	Jim Padgett		Dick Edwards	Padgett left to coach Nevada.
Canisius	Bob MacKinnon		John Morrison	MacKinnon left to join the coaching staff for the Buffalo Braves
Cincinnati	Tay Baker		Gale Catlett	Baker left to coach Xavier. Catlett was formerly an assistant with Kentucky.
Colgate	Ed Ashnault		Bill Vesp	Ashnault left to coach William & Mary.
Cornell	Jerry Lace		Tony Coma	
Dartmouth	George Blaney		Tom O'Connor	Blaney left to coach Holy Cross.
Denver	Jim Karabetsos		Al Harden	
Georgetown	Jack Magee		John Thompson	McGee was fired at the end of the season after the 1971–72 Georgetown team finished with a record of 3–23.
Gonzaga	Hank Anderson		Adrian Buoncristiani	
Hardin–Simmons	Glen Whitis		Russell Berry	
Hofstra	Paul Lynner		Roger Gaeckler	
Holy Cross	Jack Donohue		George Blaney	
Kentucky	Adolph Rupp		Joe B. Hall	Rupp retired as the NCAA all-time leader in victories after reaching the Commonwealth of Kentucky's mandatory retirement age of 70. He was replaced by lead assistant Hall, who coached the Wildcats for 13 seasons and led UK to the 1978 national championship.
Lehigh	Roy Heckman		Tom Pugliese	
LSU	Press Maravich		Dale Brown	Maravich, father of NCAA career scoring leader Pete Maravich, was fired after the Tigers finished 10–16 in their first season in the LSU Assembly Center (later renamed for Pete Maravich in 1988). He was succeeded by Washington State assistant Brown, who remained at LSU for 25 seasons. Maravich left to coach Appalachian State.
Marshall	Carl Tacy		Bob Daniels	Tacy left after the season to become the head coach at Wake Forest.
Montana State	Gary Hulst		Hank Anderson	
Nevada	Jack Spencer		Jim Padgett	Spencer stepped down to take an assistant coaching job under new head coach Jim Padgett.
New Mexico	Bob King		Norm Ellenberger	King left to be the athletic director at Indiana State.
Pacific	Dick Edwards		Stan Morrison	
Purdue	George King		Fred Schaus	
Saint Peter's	Don Kennedy		Bernie Ockene	
Seattle	Morris Buckwalter		Bill O'Connor	
Vermont	Arthur Loche		Peter Salzberg	
VMI	Mike Schuler		Bill Blair	
Wake Forest	Jack McCloskey		Carl Tacy	McCloskey left after the season to become the head coach for the NBA's Portland Trail Blazers.
Washington State	Bob Greenwood		George Raveling	
