= 1971–72 Georgetown Hoyas men's basketball team =

American college basketball season

1971–72 Georgetown Hoyas men's basketball
- Conference: Independent
- Record: 3–23
- Head coach: John Magee (6th season)
- Assistant coaches: Ed MacNamara (1st season); Don Weber (1st season)
- Captain: Mike Laughna
- Home arena: McDonough Gymnasium

1971–72 NCAA University Division men's basketball independents standings
	Conf.				Overall
Team	W		L	PCT	W		L	PCT
No. 16 Oral Roberts		–		–	26	–	2	.929
No. 7 Marquette		–		–	25	–	4	.862
Hawaii		–		–	23	–	4	.852
No. 12 Marshall		–		–	23	–	4	.852
No. 10 Florida State		–		–	28	–	5	.848
Northern Illinois		–		–	21	–	4	.840
No. 6 South Carolina		–		–	24	–	5	.828
Duquesne		–		–	20	–	5	.800
Syracuse		–		–	22	–	6	.786
Providence		–		–	21	–	6	.778
Detroit		–		–	18	–	6	.750
Houston		–		–	20	–	7	.741
Jacksonville		–		–	20	–	8	.714
No. 15 Villanova		–		–	20	–	8	.714
Pan American		–		–	17	–	7	.708
Niagara		–		–	21	–	9	.700
Penn State		–		–	17	–	8	.680
Fordham		–		–	18	–	9	.667
St. Bonaventure		–		–	16	–	8	.667
Cincinnati		–		–	17	–	9	.654
Georgia Southern		–		–	17	–	9	.654
Colgate		–		–	15	–	8	.652
St. John's		–		–	19	–	11	.633
Fairleigh Dickinson		–		–	15	–	9	.625
Illinois State		–		–	16	–	10	.615
Virginia Tech		–		–	16	–	10	.615
Canisius		–		–	15	–	11	.577
Creighton		–		–	15	–	11	.577
Holy Cross		–		–	15	–	11	.577
Oklahoma City		–		–	16	–	12	.571
Loyola (LA)		–		–	14	–	11	.560
Rutgers		–		–	14	–	11	.560
West Virginia		–		–	13	–	11	.542
Hardin–Simmons		–		–	14	–	12	.538
DePaul		–		–	12	–	11	.522
Centenary		–		–	13	–	12	.520
Long Island		–		–	13	–	12	.520
Boston College		–		–	13	–	13	.500
Dayton		–		–	13	–	13	.500
Pittsburgh		–		–	12	–	12	.500
Air Force		–		–	12	–	13	.480
Fairfield		–		–	12	–	13	.480
Saint Francis (PA)		–		–	12	–	13	.480
Saint Peter's		–		–	12	–	13	.480
Indiana State		–		–	12	–	14	.462
St. Francis (NY)		–		–	12	–	14	.462
Utah State		–		–	12	–	14	.462
Xavier		–		–	12	–	14	.462
Army		–		–	11	–	13	.458
Manhattan		–		–	11	–	13	.458
George Washington		–		–	11	–	14	.440
Navy		–		–	10	–	13	.435
Denver		–		–	11	–	15	.423
Portland		–		–	10	–	16	.385
Seton Hall		–		–	10	–	16	.385
Southern Illinois		–		–	10	–	16	.385
Ball State		–		–	9	–	15	.375
Loyola (IL)		–		–	8	–	14	.364
Tulane		–		–	8	–	18	.308
Boston University		–		–	7	–	16	.304
South Alabama		–		–	7	–	17	.292
Iona		–		–	6	–	17	.261
Butler		–		–	6	–	20	.231
Georgia Tech		–		–	6	–	20	.231
Notre Dame		–		–	6	–	20	.231
Stetson		–		–	6	–	20	.231
Georgetown		–		–	3	–	23	.115
Rankings from AP Poll

The 1971–72 Georgetown Hoyas men's basketball team represented Georgetown University during the 1971–72 NCAA University Division college basketball season. John Magee coached the team in his sixth and final season as head coach. The team was an independent and played its home games at McDonough Gymnasium on the Georgetown campus in Washington, D.C. They finished the season with a record of 3–23, and therefore were not ranked in the Top 20 in the Associated Press Poll or Coaches' Poll at any time, and had no post-season play.

== Season recap ==
Forward Art White, thought at the time to have been the greatest player in Georgetown history, had left the team at the end of the previous season because of academic difficulties and sat out this season entirely. Magee's relationship with his players had begun to unravel the previous year when the 1970–71 team had followed up the 1969–70 team's appearance in the 1970 National Invitation Tournament with a disappointing performance. Magee blamed this on the players, including the once highly-regarded White, although he reserved praise for then-junior forward Mike Laughna. In all, Georgetown lost all but two of its top nine scorers from the 1970–71 season.

Magee's deteriorating relationship with his players and the loss of scorers were not the 1971–72 squad's only problems. Athletic director Robert Sigholtz had committed the Hoyas to a schedule that included only 10 home games and forced the team to play nine straight road games between December 13, 1971, and January 22, 1972. Magee, working in the last year of his contract with no sign of the university offering an extension, openly feuded with Sigholtz over this schedule, and over whether Sigholz had provided Magee with an adequate recruiting budget, which totaled only $5,140. After senior and team captain Laughna said in an interview with The Washington Post that Georgetown did not seem to spend very much of the revenue it earned from the team on the basketball program itself, Sigholtz responded with an ineffective late-season news conference that failed to address Laughna's comments and deflected criticism onto Magee, blaming him for the unfavorable schedule and for not fully using the recruiting tools he had available to him. Observers took away little more than the impression that the Georgetown athletic department was deeply troubled.

Under these difficult circumstances, Mike Laughna put in a creditable performance on the court during the otherwise dismal season, with 25 points and 11 rebounds at Texas, 22 points and 12 rebounds three days later at San Francisco, and 24 points and 15 rebounds against George Washington. He passed Jim Barry as the top scorer in Georgetown history on March 4, 1972, during a loss at Boston College in the final game of the season and of his collegiate career, finishing with 1,234 career points. Despite Laughna's efforts, the team won only one game each in December, January, and February.

The 1971–72 team's .115 winning percentage was the worst in Georgetown men's basketball history and well below the previous worst of .238 set by the 5–16 team of 1930–31. Magee resigned two weeks after Sigholtz's news conference, ending his six-year tenure as head coach which had seen two winning seasons and one post-season tournament appearance. Sigholtz resigned nine days after Magee.

Although it was not known at the time, the 1971–72 season brought a 25-year stretch of mostly undistinguished basketball at Georgetown to an end. Despite the team appearing in the National Invitation Tournament in 1953 and 1970, between the 1947–48 season and the end of this season, Georgetown posted an overall record under .500 and its total of 296 wins during those 25 seasons was the lowest among the 32 Catholic universities playing Division I college basketball in the United States. The team also had had no NCAA tournament appearances since 1943. The arrival of John Thompson, Jr., as head coach the following season, however, would begin Georgetown's rise to the status of national basketball power.

== Roster ==
#	Name	Height	Weight (lbs.)	Position	Class	Hometown	Previous team(s)
10	Paul Robinson	6'6"	N/A	F	So.	New York, NY, U.S.	DeWitt Clinton HS
12	Tim Lambour	5'8"	N/A	G	So.	Altoona, PA, U.S.	Bishop Guilfoyle HS
22	Rick Kentz	6'1"	N/A	G	So.	Summit, NJ, U.S.	Delbarton School
24	Vince Fletcher	6'1"	N/A	G	Jr.	New York, NY, U.S.	DeWitt Clinton HS
30	Mike Geoghegan	6'4"	N/A	F	Jr.	Cincinnati, OH, U.S.	St. Xavier HS
32	Ron Lyons	6'8"	N/A	C	So.	Philadelphia, PA, U.S.	Northwest College (Wyoming)
34	Tom McBride	5'10"	N/A	G	Jr.	South Lake, NJ, U.S.	Staunton Military Academy (Staunton, VA)
40	Tom Dooley	6'5"	N/A	F	So.	Rumson, NJ, U.S.	Rumson-Fair Haven Regional HS
42	Mike Laughna	6'7"	210	F	Sr.	North Caldwell, NJ, U.S.	Saint Benedict's Preparatory School
44	Don Willis	6'1"	N/A	G	So.	Hyattsville, MD, U.S.	DeMatha Catholic HS
52	Mark Mitchell	6'8"	N/A	C	Sr.	Chicago, IL, U.S.	Loyola Academy
54	Mark Edwards	6'5"	N/A	F	Jr.	Hyattsville, MD, U.S.	DeMatha Catholic HS

== 1971–72 schedule and results ==
Date time, TV	Rank^{#}	Opponent^{#}	Result	Record	Site city, state
Regular Season
Sat., Dec. 4, 1971 no, no		at Boston University	L 93–103	0-1	Case Gymnasium; Boston, MA
Tue., Dec. 7, 1971 no, no		No. 14 St. John's	L 67–107	0-2	McDonough Gymnasium; Washington, DC
Sat., Dec. 11, 1971 no, no		Loyola Maryland	W 82–66	1-2	McDonough Gymnasium; Washington, DC
Mon., Dec. 13, 1971 no, no		at No. 5 Maryland	L 46–79	1-3	Cole Field House; College Park, MD
Mon., Dec. 27, 1971 no, no		vs. No. 2 Marquette; Milwaukee Invitational Tournament	L 44–88	1-4	Milwaukee Arena; Milwaukee, WI
Tue., Dec. 28, 1971 no, no		vs. Wisconsin; Milwaukee Invitational Tournament	L 62–82	1-5	Milwaukee Arena; Milwaukee, WI
Thu., Jan. 6, 1972 no, no		at Louisiana State	L 71–92	1-6	LSU Assembly Center; Baton Rouge, LA
Sat., Jan. 8, 1972 no, no		at Texas	L 70–78	1-7	Gregory Gymnasium; Austin, TX
Tue., Jan. 11, 1972 no, no		at San Francisco	L 76–100	1-8	War Memorial Gymnasium; San Francisco, CA
Thu., Jan. 13, 1972 no, no		at Pacific	L 73–105	1-9	University Gymnasium; Stockton, CA
Tue., Jan. 18, 1972 no, no		at Randolph–Macon	L 72–73	1-10	Crenshaw Gymnasium; Ashland, VA
Sat., Jan. 22, 1972 no, no		at Seton Hall	L 72–98	1-11	Walsh Gymnasium; South Orange, NJ
Thu., Jan. 27, 1972 no, no		William & Mary	W 85–78 ^{OT}	2-11	McDonough Gymnasium; Washington, DC
Sat., Jan. 29, 1972 no, no		Holy Cross	L 83–85	2-12	McDonough Gymnasium; Washington, DC
Tue., Feb. 1, 1972 no, no		American	L 75–82 ^{OT}	2-13	McDonough Gymnasium; Washington, DC
Thu., Feb. 3, 1972 no, no		at Connecticut; Rivalry	L 81–89	2-14	University of Connecticut Field House; Storrs, CT
Sat., Feb. 5, 1972 no, no		Penn State	L 62–63	2-15	McDonough Gymnasium; Washington, DC
Thu., Feb. 10, 1972 no, no		Assumption	L 83–90	2-16	McDonough Gymnasium; Washington, DC
Sat., Feb. 12, 1972 no, no		Rutgers	L 58–72	2-17	McDonough Gymnasium; Washington, DC
Mon., Feb. 14, 1972 no, no		at Navy	L 66–70	2-18	Halsey Field House; Annapolis, MD
Wed., Feb. 16, 1972 no, no		at St. Joseph's	L 70–81	2-19	Palestra; Philadelphia, PA
Sun., Feb. 20, 1972 no, no		Hofstra	W 109–97	3-19	McDonough Gymnasium; Washington, DC
Thu., Feb. 24, 1972 no, no		at Manhattan	L 72–86	3-20	Madison Square Garden; New York, NY
Sat., Feb. 26, 1972 no, no		at Fordham	L 78–106	3-21	Rose Hill Gymnasium; Bronx, NY
Tue., Feb. 29, 1972 no, no		George Washington	L 83–88	3-22	McDonough Gymnasium; Washington, DC
Sat., Mar. 4, 1972 no, no		at Boston College	L 69–78	3-23	Roberts Center; Chestnut Hill, MA
*Non-conference game. ^{#}Rankings from AP Poll. (#) Tournament seedings in parentheses.
