= 1971–72 Florida State Seminoles men's basketball team =

American college basketball season

1971–72 Florida State Seminoles men's basketball

NCAA tournament, Runner-up

National Championship Game, L 76-81 vs. UCLA
- Conference: Independent

Ranking
- Coaches: No. 10
- AP: No. 10
- Record: 27–6 (28–5 unadjusted)
- Head coach: Hugh Durham (6th season)
- Assistant coaches: Bill Bolton; Morris McHone; Al Lawson
- Home arena: Tully Gymnasium

1971–72 NCAA University Division men's basketball independents standings
	Conf.				Overall
Team	W		L	PCT	W		L	PCT
No. 16 Oral Roberts		–		–	26	–	2	.929
No. 7 Marquette		–		–	25	–	4	.862
Hawaii		–		–	23	–	4	.852
No. 12 Marshall		–		–	23	–	4	.852
No. 10 Florida State		–		–	28	–	5	.848
Northern Illinois		–		–	21	–	4	.840
No. 6 South Carolina		–		–	24	–	5	.828
Duquesne		–		–	20	–	5	.800
Syracuse		–		–	22	–	6	.786
Providence		–		–	21	–	6	.778
Detroit		–		–	18	–	6	.750
Houston		–		–	20	–	7	.741
Jacksonville		–		–	20	–	8	.714
No. 15 Villanova		–		–	20	–	8	.714
Pan American		–		–	17	–	7	.708
Niagara		–		–	21	–	9	.700
Penn State		–		–	17	–	8	.680
Fordham		–		–	18	–	9	.667
St. Bonaventure		–		–	16	–	8	.667
Cincinnati		–		–	17	–	9	.654
Georgia Southern		–		–	17	–	9	.654
Colgate		–		–	15	–	8	.652
St. John's		–		–	19	–	11	.633
Fairleigh Dickinson		–		–	15	–	9	.625
Illinois State		–		–	16	–	10	.615
Virginia Tech		–		–	16	–	10	.615
Canisius		–		–	15	–	11	.577
Creighton		–		–	15	–	11	.577
Holy Cross		–		–	15	–	11	.577
Oklahoma City		–		–	16	–	12	.571
Loyola (LA)		–		–	14	–	11	.560
Rutgers		–		–	14	–	11	.560
West Virginia		–		–	13	–	11	.542
Hardin–Simmons		–		–	14	–	12	.538
DePaul		–		–	12	–	11	.522
Centenary		–		–	13	–	12	.520
Long Island		–		–	13	–	12	.520
Boston College		–		–	13	–	13	.500
Dayton		–		–	13	–	13	.500
Pittsburgh		–		–	12	–	12	.500
Air Force		–		–	12	–	13	.480
Fairfield		–		–	12	–	13	.480
Saint Francis (PA)		–		–	12	–	13	.480
Saint Peter's		–		–	12	–	13	.480
Indiana State		–		–	12	–	14	.462
St. Francis (NY)		–		–	12	–	14	.462
Utah State		–		–	12	–	14	.462
Xavier		–		–	12	–	14	.462
Army		–		–	11	–	13	.458
Manhattan		–		–	11	–	13	.458
George Washington		–		–	11	–	14	.440
Navy		–		–	10	–	13	.435
Denver		–		–	11	–	15	.423
Portland		–		–	10	–	16	.385
Seton Hall		–		–	10	–	16	.385
Southern Illinois		–		–	10	–	16	.385
Ball State		–		–	9	–	15	.375
Loyola (IL)		–		–	8	–	14	.364
Tulane		–		–	8	–	18	.308
Boston University		–		–	7	–	16	.304
South Alabama		–		–	7	–	17	.292
Iona		–		–	6	–	17	.261
Butler		–		–	6	–	20	.231
Georgia Tech		–		–	6	–	20	.231
Notre Dame		–		–	6	–	20	.231
Stetson		–		–	6	–	20	.231
Georgetown		–		–	3	–	23	.115
Rankings from AP Poll

The 1971–72 Florida State Seminoles men's basketball team represented Florida State University during the 1971–72 college basketball season. Led by head coach Hugh Durham, the Seminoles reached the championship game of the NCAA tournament before losing to unbeaten, 5-time defending national champion UCLA, 81–76. The team finished with an overall record of 28–5.

== Hawaii game forfeited ==
Florida State traveled to Hawaii to play two games against The Hawaii Rainbow Warriors basketball team. On December 18, and 22nd, 1971. Florida State lost both games, the first game wasn't decided on the court.

Florida State lost its first game, a forfeiture-shortened 30–10 decision. Florida State coach Hugh Durham, spoke about how as result of his disagreement with the officials, the referee called a forfeit in the middle of the game.

Durham said, "I go out there to do what coaches try to do and get a technical. I'm telling the official, 'These are two good teams, let 'em play, we came a long way, blah, blah, blah ...' and he tells me, 'Go sit down coach or I'm going to call a technical.' Well, that was what I went out there for, to get a technical, so I told him, 'Go ahead, call the son-of-a-bleep' and he tells me, 'Coach, you're out of the game.'"

"I think he thought I swore at him," said Durham, who now laughs at the memories.

When Durham refused to leave the court after the free throws had been shot, referee David Mahukona called the game and it went into the books as a forfeit.

When FSU beat the Hawaii Marines a night later, Durham remembers, "the headline in the paper was, 'Florida State finishes game.' "

Hawaii's 1971–72 team finished 24–3 and captured the program's first NCAA tournament bid behind scoring leader Bob Nash.

== Roster ==
1971–72 Florida State Seminoles men's basketball team
Players
Coaches

Pos.	#	Name	Height	Weight	Year	Previous school	Hometown
G	3	Greg Samuel	5 ft 8 in (1.73 m)	150 lb (68 kg)	Sr	Key West	Hollywood, Florida
F	10	Ron Harris	6 ft 4 in (1.93 m)	195 lb (88 kg)	Sr	Broward CC	Key West, Florida
G	11	Otto Petty	5 ft 7 in (1.7 m)	150 lb (68 kg)	Jr	Central	Louisville, Kentucky
F	15	John Amick	6 ft 7 in (2.01 m)	195 lb (88 kg)	So	St. Petersburg	St. Petersburg, Florida
F	21	Larry Gay	6 ft 5 in (1.96 m)	195 lb (88 kg)	Jr	George Rogers Clark	Winchester, Kentucky
G	22	Otis Cole	6 ft 2 in (1.88 m)	175 lb (79 kg)	So	Kings Mountain	Kings Mountain, North Carolina
C	23	Rowland Garrett	6 ft 6 in (1.98 m)	212 lb (96 kg)	Sr	Rogers	Canton, Mississippi
C	25	Reggie Royals	6 ft 10 in (2.08 m)	200 lb (91 kg)	Jr	Whiteville	Whiteville, North Carolina
SG	33	Ron King	6 ft 4 in (1.93 m)	180 lb (82 kg)	Jr	Central	Louisville, Kentucky
C	44	Lawrence McCray	6 ft 11 in (2.11 m)	210 lb (95 kg)	So	Washington	Pensacola, Florida

Head coach

- Hugh Durham (Florida State)

Assistant coach(es)

- Bill Bolton
- Morris McHone
- Al Lawson

Legend

- (C) Team captain
- (S) Suspended
- (I) Ineligible
- (W) Walk-on
- Injured
- Current redshirt

== Schedule and results ==
Date time, TV	Rank^{#}	Opponent^{#}	Result	Record	Site city, state
Regular season
Dec 1, 1971*		Oglethorpe	W 112–69	1–0	Tully Gymnasium; Tallahassee, Florida
Dec 4, 1971*		Eastern Kentucky	W 96–83	2–0	Tully Gymnasium; Tallahassee, Florida
Dec 6, 1971*	No. 18	vs. Stetson; Civitan Classic	W 90–54	3–0	Jacksonville Memorial Coliseum; Jacksonville, Florida
Dec 7, 1971*	No. 18	at No. 8 Jacksonville; Civitan Classic	W 90–83	4–0	Jacksonville Memorial Coliseum; Jacksonville, Florida
Dec 11, 1971*	No. 18	Valdosta State	W 134–65	5–0	Tully Gymnasium; Tallahassee, Florida
Dec 18, 1971*	No. 9	at Hawaii	L 10–30	5–1	Neal S. Blaisdell Center; Honolulu, Hawaii
Dec 22, 1971*	No. 14	at Hawaii	L 76–81	5–2	Neal S. Blaisdell Center; Honolulu, Hawaii
Dec 27, 1971*	No. 14	vs. Washington; Far West Classic	W 85–77	6–2	Portland, Oregon
Dec 29, 1971*		vs. Oregon State; Far West Classic	W 73–72	7–2	
Dec 30, 1971*		vs. Washington State; Far West Classic	W 85–61	8–2	
Jan 3, 1972*		vs. Denver; Senior Bowl	W 89–72	7–2	Mobile, Alabama
Jan 4, 1972*	No. 20	at Saint Louis; Senior Bowl	W 63–62	10–2	Mobile, Alabama
Jan 8, 1972*	No. 20	East Tennessee State	W 106–63	11–2	Tully Gymnasium; Tallahassee, Florida
Jan 15, 1972*	No. 12	Mercer	W 96–78	12–2	Tully Gymnasium; Tallahassee, Florida
Jan 16, 1972*	No. 12	Houston	W 86–79	13–2	Tully Gymnasium; Tallahassee, Florida
Jan 19, 1972*	No. 11	South Alabama	W 105–72	14–2	Tully Gymnasium; Tallahassee, Florida
Jan 22, 1972*	No. 11	at Georgia Tech	W 71–69	15–2	Alexander Memorial Coliseum; Atlanta, Georgia
Jan 26, 1972*	No. 10	Jacksonville	L 82–84	15–3	Tully Gymnasium; Tallahassee, Florida
Jan 26, 1972*	No. 10	Florida Southern	W 84–63	16–3	Tully Gymnasium; Tallahassee, Florida
Jan 31, 1972*	No. 10	Pan American	W 109–83	17–3	Tully Gymnasium; Tallahassee, Florida
Feb 4, 1972*	No. 12	at Houston	L 86–94	17–4	Hofheinz Pavilion; Houston, Texas
Feb 7, 1972*	No. 12	at South Alabama	W 104–81	18–4	Jaguar Gym; Mobile, Alabama
Feb 12, 1972*	No. 14	Tulane	W 94–84	19–4	Tully Gymnasium; Tallahassee, Florida
Feb 19, 1972*	No. 14	Georgia Tech	W 108–50	20–4	Tully Gymnasium; Tallahassee, Florida
Feb 23, 1972*	No. 11	at Jacksonville	W 70–61	21–4	Jacksonville Memorial Coliseum; Jacksonville, Florida
Feb 26, 1972*	No. 11	vs. Stetson	W 49–47	22–4	Winter Park, Florida
Feb 28, 1972*	No. 11	at Biscayne	W 94–66	23–4	Miami Gardens, Florida
Mar 4, 1972*	No. 10	at Cincinnati	L 64–88	23–5	Armory Fieldhouse; Cincinnati, Ohio
NCAA Tournament
Mar 11, 1972*	No. 14	vs. Eastern Kentucky; Mideast Regional Quarterfinal	W 83–81	24–5	Stokely Athletic Center (4,500); Knoxville, Tennessee
Mar 16, 1972*	No. 10	vs. No. 11 Minnesota; Mideast Regional semifinal – Sweet Sixteen	W 70–56	25–5	University of Dayton Arena (13,458); Dayton, Ohio
Mar 18, 1972*	No. 10	vs. No. 18 Kentucky; Mideast Regional final – Elite Eight	W 73–54	26–5	University of Dayton Arena (13,458); Dayton, Ohio
Mar 23, 1972*	No. 10	vs. No. 2 North Carolina; National semifinal – Final Four	W 79–75	27–5	L.A. Sports Arena (13,756); Los Angeles, California
Mar 25, 1972*	No. 10	vs. No. 1 UCLA; National Championship	L 76–81	27–6	L.A. Sports Arena (15,063); Los Angeles, California
*Non-conference game. ^{#}Rankings from AP Poll. (#) Tournament seedings in parentheses. ME=Mideast. All times are in Eastern.

== NBA draft ==
Round	Pick	Player	NBA club
5	78	Rowland Garrett	Chicago Bulls
