= 1971–72 Marquette Warriors men's basketball team =

American college basketball season

1971–72 Marquette Warriors men's basketball

NCAA Men's Division I Tournament, Sweet Sixteen
- Conference: Independent

Ranking
- Coaches: No. 7
- AP: No. 7
- Record: 25–4
- Head coach: Al McGuire
- Home arena: Milwaukee Arena

1971–72 NCAA University Division men's basketball independents standings
| | Conf. | | | | Overall |
| Team | W | | L | PCT | W | | L | PCT |
|---|---|---|---|---|---|---|---|---|
| No. 16 Oral Roberts | | – | | – | 26 | – | 2 | .929 |
| No. 7 Marquette | | – | | – | 25 | – | 4 | .862 |
| Hawaii | | – | | – | 23 | – | 4 | .852 |
| No. 12 Marshall | | – | | – | 23 | – | 4 | .852 |
| No. 10 Florida State | | – | | – | 28 | – | 5 | .848 |
| Northern Illinois | | – | | – | 21 | – | 4 | .840 |
| No. 6 South Carolina | | – | | – | 24 | – | 5 | .828 |
| Duquesne | | – | | – | 20 | – | 5 | .800 |
| Syracuse | | – | | – | 22 | – | 6 | .786 |
| Providence | | – | | – | 21 | – | 6 | .778 |
| Detroit | | – | | – | 18 | – | 6 | .750 |
| Houston | | – | | – | 20 | – | 7 | .741 |
| Jacksonville | | – | | – | 20 | – | 8 | .714 |
| No. 15 Villanova | | – | | – | 20 | – | 8 | .714 |
| Pan American | | – | | – | 17 | – | 7 | .708 |
| Niagara | | – | | – | 21 | – | 9 | .700 |
| Penn State | | – | | – | 17 | – | 8 | .680 |
| Fordham | | – | | – | 18 | – | 9 | .667 |
| St. Bonaventure | | – | | – | 16 | – | 8 | .667 |
| Cincinnati | | – | | – | 17 | – | 9 | .654 |
| Georgia Southern | | – | | – | 17 | – | 9 | .654 |
| Colgate | | – | | – | 15 | – | 8 | .652 |
| St. John's | | – | | – | 19 | – | 11 | .633 |
| Fairleigh Dickinson | | – | | – | 15 | – | 9 | .625 |
| Illinois State | | – | | – | 16 | – | 10 | .615 |
| Virginia Tech | | – | | – | 16 | – | 10 | .615 |
| Canisius | | – | | – | 15 | – | 11 | .577 |
| Creighton | | – | | – | 15 | – | 11 | .577 |
| Holy Cross | | – | | – | 15 | – | 11 | .577 |
| Oklahoma City | | – | | – | 16 | – | 12 | .571 |
| Loyola (LA) | | – | | – | 14 | – | 11 | .560 |
| Rutgers | | – | | – | 14 | – | 11 | .560 |
| West Virginia | | – | | – | 13 | – | 11 | .542 |
| Hardin–Simmons | | – | | – | 14 | – | 12 | .538 |
| DePaul | | – | | – | 12 | – | 11 | .522 |
| Centenary | | – | | – | 13 | – | 12 | .520 |
| Long Island | | – | | – | 13 | – | 12 | .520 |
| Boston College | | – | | – | 13 | – | 13 | .500 |
| Dayton | | – | | – | 13 | – | 13 | .500 |
| Pittsburgh | | – | | – | 12 | – | 12 | .500 |
| Air Force | | – | | – | 12 | – | 13 | .480 |
| Fairfield | | – | | – | 12 | – | 13 | .480 |
| Saint Francis (PA) | | – | | – | 12 | – | 13 | .480 |
| Saint Peter's | | – | | – | 12 | – | 13 | .480 |
| Indiana State | | – | | – | 12 | – | 14 | .462 |
| St. Francis (NY) | | – | | – | 12 | – | 14 | .462 |
| Utah State | | – | | – | 12 | – | 14 | .462 |
| Xavier | | – | | – | 12 | – | 14 | .462 |
| Army | | – | | – | 11 | – | 13 | .458 |
| Manhattan | | – | | – | 11 | – | 13 | .458 |
| George Washington | | – | | – | 11 | – | 14 | .440 |
| Navy | | – | | – | 10 | – | 13 | .435 |
| Denver | | – | | – | 11 | – | 15 | .423 |
| Portland | | – | | – | 10 | – | 16 | .385 |
| Seton Hall | | – | | – | 10 | – | 16 | .385 |
| Southern Illinois | | – | | – | 10 | – | 16 | .385 |
| Ball State | | – | | – | 9 | – | 15 | .375 |
| Loyola (IL) | | – | | – | 8 | – | 14 | .364 |
| Tulane | | – | | – | 8 | – | 18 | .308 |
| Boston University | | – | | – | 7 | – | 16 | .304 |
| South Alabama | | – | | – | 7 | – | 17 | .292 |
| Iona | | – | | – | 6 | – | 17 | .261 |
| Butler | | – | | – | 6 | – | 20 | .231 |
| Georgia Tech | | – | | – | 6 | – | 20 | .231 |
| Notre Dame | | – | | – | 6 | – | 20 | .231 |
| Stetson | | – | | – | 6 | – | 20 | .231 |
| Georgetown | | – | | – | 3 | – | 23 | .115 |
Rankings from AP Poll

The 1971–72 Marquette Warriors men's basketball team represented the Marquette University in the 1971–72 season. The Warriors finished the regular season with a record of 25–4.

== Roster ==
1971–72 Marquette Warriors men's basketball team
Players
Coaches

| Pos. | # | Name | Height | Weight | Year | Hometown |
|---|---|---|---|---|---|---|
| F | 22 | Jim Chones | 6 ft 11 in (2.11 m) | 220 lb (100 kg) | So | Racine, Wisconsin |
| F | 50 | George Frazier | 6 ft 3 in (1.91 m) | 185 lb (84 kg) | Jr | New York |
| G | 33 | Gary Grzesk | 6 ft 0 in (1.83 m) | 172 lb (78 kg) | Sr | Milwaukee, Wisconsin |
| G | 45 | Bob Lackey | 6 ft 5 in (1.96 m) | 200 lb (91 kg) | Jr | Evanston, Illinois |
| F | 30 | Guy Lam | 6 ft 8 in (2.03 m) | 200 lb (91 kg) | Sr | Arlington Heights, Illinois |
| G | 12 | Allie McGuire | 6 ft 3 in (1.91 m) | 175 lb (79 kg) | Jr | Brookfield, Wisconsin |
| F | 31 | Larry McNeill | 6 ft 9 in (2.06 m) | 195 lb (88 kg) | So | Brooklyn, New York |
| C | 35 | Mike Mills | 6 ft 10 in (2.08 m) | 190 lb (86 kg) | Jr | Milwaukee, Wisconsin |
| G | 25 | Mark Ostrand | 6 ft 3 in (1.91 m) | 170 lb (77 kg) | Jr | Sturgeon Bay, Wisconsin |
| G | 21 | Steve Raymonds | 6 ft 3 in (1.91 m) | 165 lb (75 kg) | Sr | Wauwatosa, Wisconsin |
| G | 15 | Kurt Spychalla | 6 ft 4 in (1.93 m) | 180 lb (82 kg) | Jr | Schofield, Wisconsin |
| G | 55 | Marcus Washington | 6 ft 1 in (1.85 m) | 160 lb (73 kg) | So | Lyons, Illinois |

Head coach

- Al McGuire

Assistant coach(es)

- Hank Raymonds
- Rick Majerus

Legend

- (C) Team captain
- (S) Suspended
- (I) Ineligible
- (W) Walk-on
- Injured
- Current redshirt

== Schedule ==
| Date time, TV | Rank^{#} | Opponent^{#} | Result | Record | Site city, state |
|---|---|---|---|---|---|
| December 1 | No. 4 | St. John's (MN) | W 89–50 | 1–0 | Milwaukee Arena; Milwaukee, WI |
| December 4 | No. 4 | Bowling Green State | W 84–64 | 2–0 | Milwaukee Arena; Milwaukee, WI |
| December 7 | No. 2 | at Memphis | W 74–73 | 3–0 | Mid-South Coliseum; Memphis, Tennessee |
| December 13 | No. 2 | No. 9 Michigan | W 81–52 | 4–0 | Milwaukee Arena; Milwaukee, WI |
| December 18 | No. 2 | Fordham | W 87–68 | 5–0 | Milwaukee Arena; Milwaukee, WI |
| December 21 | No. 2 | Minnesota | W 55–40 | 6–0 | Milwaukee Arena; Milwaukee, WI |
| December 27 | No. 2 | Georgetown | W 88–44 | 7–0 | Milwaukee Arena; Milwaukee, WI |
| December 28 | No. 2 | No. 17 Marshall | W 74–72 | 8–0 | Milwaukee Arena; Milwaukee, WI |
| January 3 | No. 2 | Wisconsin | W 72–60 | 9–0 | Milwaukee Arena; Milwaukee, WI |
| January 9 | No. 2 | at No. 4 South Carolina | W 72–71 | 10-0 | Carolina Coliseum; Columbia, SC |
| January 11 | No. 2 | at Nevada | W 82–55 | 11-0 | Virginia Street Gymnasium; Reno, Nevada |
| January 15 | No. 2 | Detroit | W 68–66 | 12–0 | Milwaukee Arena; Milwaukee, WI |
| January 19 | No. 2 | Loyola (IL) | W 80–70 | 13–0 | Milwaukee Arena; Milwaukee, WI |
| January 22 | No. 2 | DePaul | W 70–61 | 14–0 | Milwaukee Arena; Milwaukee, WI |
| January 24 | No. 2 | at Notre Dame | W 71–62 | 15–0 | Joyce Center; South Bend, Indiana |
| January 29 | No. 2 | at Loyola (IL) | W 69–67 | 16–0 | Alumni Gym |
| February 5 | No. 2 | at DePaul | W 79–61 | 17–0 | Alumni Hall; Chicago, Illinois |
| February 9 | No. 2 | Xavier | W 89–59 | 18–0 | Milwaukee Arena; Milwaukee, WI |
| February 12 | No. 2 | Air Force | W 79–56 | 19–0 | Milwaukee Arena; Milwaukee, WI |
| February 14 | No. 2 | Butler | W 90–76 | 20–0 | Milwaukee Arena; Milwaukee, WI |
| February 16 | No. 2 | Jacksonville | W 88–79 | 21–0 | Milwaukee Arena; Milwaukee, WI |
| February 19 | No. 2 | Creighton | W 70–61 | 22–0 | Milwaukee Arena; Milwaukee, WI |
| February 26 | No. 2 | at Detroit | L 49–70 | 22–1 | Calihan Hall; Detroit, MI |
| February 28 | No. 2 | at Xavier | W 63–55 | 23–1 | Cincinnati Gardens; Cincinnati, OH |
| March 1 | No. 5 | at Tulane | W 73–60 | 24–1 | Devlin Fieldhouse; New Orleans, Louisiana |
| March 5 | No. 5 | at New Mexico State | L 69–73 | 24–2 | Pan American Center; University Park, NM |
| March 11 | No. 7 | vs. Ohio; NCAA tournament • First Round | W 73–49 | 25–2 | Thompson-Boling Arena; Knoxville, Tennessee |
| March 16 | No. 7 | vs. No. 18 Kentucky; NCAA tournament • Regional Final | L 69–85 | 25–3 | University of Dayton Arena; Dayton, OH |
| March 18 | No. 7 | vs. No. 11 Minnesota; NCAA tournament • Regional Third Place | L 72–77 | 25–4 | University of Dayton Arena; Dayton, OH |
*Non-conference game. ^{#}Rankings from AP Poll. (#) Tournament seedings in parentheses.

== Team players drafted into the NBA ==
| Round | Pick | Player | NBA club |
|---|---|---|---|
| 5 | 71 | Bob Lackey | Atlanta Hawks |
