= 1971–72 South Carolina Gamecocks men's basketball team =

American college basketball season

1971–72 South Carolina Gamecocks men's basketball

NCAA Sweet Sixteen
- Conference: Independent

Ranking
- Coaches: No. 5
- AP: No. 6
- Record: 24–5
- Head coach: Frank McGuire (8th season)
- Home arena: Carolina Coliseum

1971–72 NCAA University Division men's basketball independents standings
	Conf.				Overall
Team	W		L	PCT	W		L	PCT
No. 16 Oral Roberts		–		–	26	–	2	.929
No. 7 Marquette		–		–	25	–	4	.862
Hawaii		–		–	23	–	4	.852
No. 12 Marshall		–		–	23	–	4	.852
No. 10 Florida State		–		–	28	–	5	.848
Northern Illinois		–		–	21	–	4	.840
No. 6 South Carolina		–		–	24	–	5	.828
Duquesne		–		–	20	–	5	.800
Syracuse		–		–	22	–	6	.786
Providence		–		–	21	–	6	.778
Detroit		–		–	18	–	6	.750
Houston		–		–	20	–	7	.741
Jacksonville		–		–	20	–	8	.714
No. 15 Villanova		–		–	20	–	8	.714
Pan American		–		–	17	–	7	.708
Niagara		–		–	21	–	9	.700
Penn State		–		–	17	–	8	.680
Fordham		–		–	18	–	9	.667
St. Bonaventure		–		–	16	–	8	.667
Cincinnati		–		–	17	–	9	.654
Georgia Southern		–		–	17	–	9	.654
Colgate		–		–	15	–	8	.652
St. John's		–		–	19	–	11	.633
Fairleigh Dickinson		–		–	15	–	9	.625
Illinois State		–		–	16	–	10	.615
Virginia Tech		–		–	16	–	10	.615
Canisius		–		–	15	–	11	.577
Creighton		–		–	15	–	11	.577
Holy Cross		–		–	15	–	11	.577
Oklahoma City		–		–	16	–	12	.571
Loyola (LA)		–		–	14	–	11	.560
Rutgers		–		–	14	–	11	.560
West Virginia		–		–	13	–	11	.542
Hardin–Simmons		–		–	14	–	12	.538
DePaul		–		–	12	–	11	.522
Centenary		–		–	13	–	12	.520
Long Island		–		–	13	–	12	.520
Boston College		–		–	13	–	13	.500
Dayton		–		–	13	–	13	.500
Pittsburgh		–		–	12	–	12	.500
Air Force		–		–	12	–	13	.480
Fairfield		–		–	12	–	13	.480
Saint Francis (PA)		–		–	12	–	13	.480
Saint Peter's		–		–	12	–	13	.480
Indiana State		–		–	12	–	14	.462
St. Francis (NY)		–		–	12	–	14	.462
Utah State		–		–	12	–	14	.462
Xavier		–		–	12	–	14	.462
Army		–		–	11	–	13	.458
Manhattan		–		–	11	–	13	.458
George Washington		–		–	11	–	14	.440
Navy		–		–	10	–	13	.435
Denver		–		–	11	–	15	.423
Portland		–		–	10	–	16	.385
Seton Hall		–		–	10	–	16	.385
Southern Illinois		–		–	10	–	16	.385
Ball State		–		–	9	–	15	.375
Loyola (IL)		–		–	8	–	14	.364
Tulane		–		–	8	–	18	.308
Boston University		–		–	7	–	16	.304
South Alabama		–		–	7	–	17	.292
Iona		–		–	6	–	17	.261
Butler		–		–	6	–	20	.231
Georgia Tech		–		–	6	–	20	.231
Notre Dame		–		–	6	–	20	.231
Stetson		–		–	6	–	20	.231
Georgetown		–		–	3	–	23	.115
Rankings from AP Poll

The 1971–72 South Carolina Gamecocks men's basketball team represented the University of South Carolina during the 1971–72 NCAA University Division men's basketball season. This was the first year in which South Carolina played as an Independent. South Carolina finished 6th in the AP Poll for the third year in a row.

== Roster ==
Name	Position	Height	Year	Stats
Tom Riker	Forward	6–10	Senior	19.6 Pts, 10.4 Reb, 0.9 Ast
Kevin Joyce	Guard	6–2	Sophomore	18.3 Pts, 4.8 Reb, 4.1 Ast
Danny Traylor	Center	7–0	Junior	14.3 Pts, 10.7 Reb, 1.0 Ast
Rick Aydlett	Forward	6–7	Senior	9.8 Pts, 6.0 Reb, 0.9 Ast
Brian Winters	Guard	6–4	Sophomore	8.3 Pts, 2.8 Reb, 1.9 Ast
Bob Carver	Guard	6–2	Junior	7.2 Pts, 3.3 Reb, 2.6 Ast
Ed Peterson	Guard	6–4	Senior	4.3 Pts, 0.4 Reb, 0.2 Ast
Ricky Mousa	Forward	6–5	Junior	1.5 Pts, 1.9 Reb, 0.2 Ast
Casey Manning	Guard	6–3	Junior	1.7 Pts, 0.7 Reb, 0.2 Ast
Jimmy Powell	Guard	5–11	Junior	0.6 Pts, 0.0 Reb
Billy Grimes	Guard	6–5	Senior	0.7 Pts, 1.0 Reb, 0.1 Ast

== Schedule ==
Date time, TV	Rank^{#}	Opponent^{#}	Result	Record	Site city, state
December 1	No. 12	at Auburn	W 84–63	1-0	Beard-Eaves-Memorial Coliseum; Auburn, AL
December 10	No. 11	at Santa Clara	W 77–66	2-0	Santa Clara, CA
December 11	No. 11	vs. Cal	W 67-59	3-0	
December 18	No. 3	Virginia Tech	W 77–76	4-0	Carolina Coliseum; Columbia, SC
December 23	No. 3	at Pitt	W 69–59	5-0	Fitzgerald Field House; Pittsburgh, PA
December 27	No. 3	vs. Fairfield	W 87–69	6-0	
December 28	No. 3	vs. Boston College	W 86–64	7-0	
December 30	No. 3	at Villanova	L 76–77	7-1	Villanova Field House; Philadelphia, PA
January 9	No. 4	No. 2 Marquette	L 71–72	7-2	Carolina Coliseum; Columbia, SC
January 12	No. 4	Manhattan	W 116-78	8-2	Carolina Coliseum; Columbia, SC
January 17	No. 4	St. Bonaventure	W 61–59	9-2	Carolina Coliseum; Columbia, SC
January 19	No. 5	Niagara	W 80–69	10-2	Carolina Coliseum; Columbia, SC
January 22	No. 5	vs. Iowa	L 85–91	10-3	
January 27	No. 11	at Fordham	W 100–77	11-3	Madison Square Garden; Manhattan, NY
January 29	No. 11	vs. No. 19 Northern Illinois	W 83–72	12-3	
February 2	No. 8	Stetson	W 98–64	13-3	Carolina Coliseum; Columbia, SC
February 5	No. 8	at Clemson	W 62–58	14-3	Littlejohn Coliseum; Clemson, SC
February 7	No. 8	DePaul	W 91–67	15-3	Carolina Coliseum; Columbia, SC
February 12	No. 9	Davidson	W 86–71	16-3	Carolina Coliseum; Columbia, SC
February 16	No. 7	UNLV	W 84–71	17-3	Las Vegas Convention Center; Las Vegas, NV
February 19	No. 7	at Houston	L 85–95	17-4	Hofheinz Pavilion; Houston, TX
February 23	No. 9	Toledo	W 94–72	18-4	Carolina Coliseum; Columbia, SC
February 26	No. 9	vs. Davidson	W 88–82	19-4	Charlotte Coliseum; Charlotte, NC
February 28	No. 9	Notre Dame	W 109–83	20-4	Carolina Coliseum; Columbia, SC
March 1	No. 8	Creighton	W 81–64	21-4	Carolina Coliseum; Columbia, SC
March 4	No. 8	Clemson	W 77–64	22-4	Carolina Coliseum; Columbia, SC
March 11	No. 6	vs. Temple; NCAA tournament	W 53-51	23-4	William & Mary Hall; Williamsburg, VA
March 16	No. 6	vs. No. 2 North Carolina; NCAA tournament	L 69-92	23-5	WVU Coliseum; Morgantown, WV
March 18	No. 6	vs. No. 15 Villanova; NCAA tournament• Third-place game	W 90-78	24-5	
*Non-conference game. ^{#}Rankings from AP Poll. (#) Tournament seedings in parentheses.

== Rankings ==
Ranking movements Legend: ██ Increase in ranking ██ Decrease in ranking
	Week																
Poll	Pre	1	2	3	4	5	6	7	8	9	10	11	12	13	14	15	Final
AP	12	12	11	3	3	3	4	4	5	11	8	9	7	9	8	6	6
Coaches	13	13	8	3	3	3	4	4	4	8	6	6	4	7	6	4	5

== Gamecocks drafted into the NBA ==
Year	Round	Pick	Player	NBA club
1972	1	8	Tom Riker	New York Knicks
