= 1971–72 Marshall Thundering Herd men's basketball team =

American college basketball season

1971–72 Marshall Thundering Herd men's basketball

NCAA tournament, First Round
- Conference: Independent

Ranking
- Coaches: No. 18
- AP: No. 12
- Record: 23–4
- Head coach: Carl Tacy (1st season)
- Associate head coach: Stewart Way
- Assistant coach: Bill Robinette
- Home arena: Veterans Memorial Fieldhouse

1971–72 NCAA University Division men's basketball independents standings
	Conf.				Overall
Team	W		L	PCT	W		L	PCT
No. 16 Oral Roberts		–		–	26	–	2	.929
No. 7 Marquette		–		–	25	–	4	.862
Hawaii		–		–	23	–	4	.852
No. 12 Marshall		–		–	23	–	4	.852
No. 10 Florida State		–		–	28	–	5	.848
Northern Illinois		–		–	21	–	4	.840
No. 6 South Carolina		–		–	24	–	5	.828
Duquesne		–		–	20	–	5	.800
Syracuse		–		–	22	–	6	.786
Providence		–		–	21	–	6	.778
Detroit		–		–	18	–	6	.750
Houston		–		–	20	–	7	.741
Jacksonville		–		–	20	–	8	.714
No. 15 Villanova		–		–	20	–	8	.714
Pan American		–		–	17	–	7	.708
Niagara		–		–	21	–	9	.700
Penn State		–		–	17	–	8	.680
Fordham		–		–	18	–	9	.667
St. Bonaventure		–		–	16	–	8	.667
Cincinnati		–		–	17	–	9	.654
Georgia Southern		–		–	17	–	9	.654
Colgate		–		–	15	–	8	.652
St. John's		–		–	19	–	11	.633
Fairleigh Dickinson		–		–	15	–	9	.625
Illinois State		–		–	16	–	10	.615
Virginia Tech		–		–	16	–	10	.615
Canisius		–		–	15	–	11	.577
Creighton		–		–	15	–	11	.577
Holy Cross		–		–	15	–	11	.577
Oklahoma City		–		–	16	–	12	.571
Loyola (LA)		–		–	14	–	11	.560
Rutgers		–		–	14	–	11	.560
West Virginia		–		–	13	–	11	.542
Hardin–Simmons		–		–	14	–	12	.538
DePaul		–		–	12	–	11	.522
Centenary		–		–	13	–	12	.520
Long Island		–		–	13	–	12	.520
Boston College		–		–	13	–	13	.500
Dayton		–		–	13	–	13	.500
Pittsburgh		–		–	12	–	12	.500
Air Force		–		–	12	–	13	.480
Fairfield		–		–	12	–	13	.480
Saint Francis (PA)		–		–	12	–	13	.480
Saint Peter's		–		–	12	–	13	.480
Indiana State		–		–	12	–	14	.462
St. Francis (NY)		–		–	12	–	14	.462
Utah State		–		–	12	–	14	.462
Xavier		–		–	12	–	14	.462
Army		–		–	11	–	13	.458
Manhattan		–		–	11	–	13	.458
George Washington		–		–	11	–	14	.440
Navy		–		–	10	–	13	.435
Denver		–		–	11	–	15	.423
Portland		–		–	10	–	16	.385
Seton Hall		–		–	10	–	16	.385
Southern Illinois		–		–	10	–	16	.385
Ball State		–		–	9	–	15	.375
Loyola (IL)		–		–	8	–	14	.364
Tulane		–		–	8	–	18	.308
Boston University		–		–	7	–	16	.304
South Alabama		–		–	7	–	17	.292
Iona		–		–	6	–	17	.261
Butler		–		–	6	–	20	.231
Georgia Tech		–		–	6	–	20	.231
Notre Dame		–		–	6	–	20	.231
Stetson		–		–	6	–	20	.231
Georgetown		–		–	3	–	23	.115
Rankings from AP Poll

The 1971–72 Marshall Thundering Herd men's basketball team represented Marshall University during the 1971–72 NCAA University Division men's basketball season. The Thundering Herd, led by first-year head coach Carl Tacy, played their home games at the Veterans Memorial Fieldhouse as an Independent. They finished the season 23–4 and received an at-large bid to the NCAA tournament where they lost to Southwestern Louisiana in the First Round. They finished ranked No. 12 in the AP Poll and No. 18 in the UPI Poll.

== Roster ==
1971–72 Marshall Thundering Herd men's basketball team
Players
Coaches

Pos.	#	Name	Height	Weight	Year	Hometown
G	10	Mike D'Antoni	6 ft 3 in (1.91 m)	185 lb (84 kg)	Jr	Mullens, West Virginia
G	14	Greg Imperi	6 ft 2 in (1.88 m)	175 lb (79 kg)	So	Huntington, West Virginia
G	22	Billy James	6 ft 4 in (1.93 m)	190 lb (86 kg)	Jr	Scottsburg, Indiana
G	23	Jerry Strittholt	6 ft 5 in (1.96 m)	205 lb (93 kg)	So	Cincinnati, Ohio
G	24	Tyrone Collins	6 ft 3 in (1.91 m)	200 lb (91 kg)	Jr	Patterson, New York
F	34	Lyle Monroe	6 ft 8 in (2.03 m)	205 lb (93 kg)	So	Fort Recovery, Ohio
F	41	Bobby Driscoll	6 ft 7 in (2.01 m)	215 lb (98 kg)	Sr	Turtle Creek, Pennsylvania
F	42	Bill Bertalan	6 ft 7 in (2.01 m)	225 lb (102 kg)	Jr	Hollywood, Florida
F	43	Gary Orsini	6 ft 4 in (1.93 m)	205 lb (93 kg)	Sr	Inwood, West Virginia
F	45	Randy Noll	6 ft 8 in (2.03 m)	210 lb (95 kg)	Jr	Covington, Kentucky
C	51	Willie Wilcox	6 ft 9 in (2.06 m)	240 lb (109 kg)	Sr	Miami, Florida
C	52	Andy Frederiksen	6 ft 9 in (2.06 m)	220 lb (100 kg)	So	St. Thomas, Virgin Islands
C	53	John Sark	6 ft 6 in (1.98 m)	205 lb (93 kg)	Jr	St. Clair Shores, Michigan
G/F	55	Russ Lee	6 ft 5 in (1.96 m)	205 lb (93 kg)	Sr	Boston, Massachusetts

Head coach

- Carl Tacy

Assistant coach(es)

- Stewart Way
- Bill Robinette

Legend

- (C) Team captain
- (S) Suspended
- (I) Ineligible
- (W) Walk-on
- Injured
- Current redshirt

== Schedule and results ==
Date time, TV	Rank^{#}	Opponent^{#}	Result	Record	Site (attendance) city, state
Regular Season
Dec 4, 1971		South Dakota	W 104–70	1–0	Veterans Memorial Fieldhouse (6,225); Huntington, WV
Dec 8, 1971		Saint Peter's	W 106–71	2–0	Veterans Memorial Fieldhouse; Huntington, WV
Dec 11, 1971		George Washington	W 97–73	3–0	Veterans Memorial Fieldhouse (6,254); Huntington, WV
Dec 13, 1971		at Morehead State	W 105–82	4–0	Wetherby Gymnasium (5,500); Morehead, KY
Dec 17, 1971		Mississippi State; Marshall Memorial Invitational	W 95–69	5–0	Veterans Memorial Fieldhouse (6,344); Huntington, WV
Dec 18, 1971		No. 8 St. John's; Marshall Memorial Invitational	W 110–107 ^{OT}	6–0	Veterans Memorial Fieldhouse (6,344); Huntington, WV
Dec 20, 1971		Maine	W 100–68	7–0	Veterans Memorial Fieldhouse (6,180); Huntington, WV
Dec 27, 1971	No. 20	vs. Wisconsin; Milwaukee Classic	W 85–83	8–0	Milwaukee Arena (10,746); Milwaukee, WI
Dec 28, 1971	No. 17	at No. 2 Marquette; Milwaukee Classic	L 72–74	8–1	Milwaukee Arena (10,746); Milwaukee, WI
Dec 30, 1971	No. 17	Ohio	W 88–81	9–1	Veterans Memorial Fieldhouse (6,500); Huntington, WV
Jan 6, 1972	No. 13	Morehead State	L 98–103	9–2	Veterans Memorial Fieldhouse (6,742); Huntington, WV
Jan 8, 1972	No. 13	Western Michigan	W 102–77	10–2	Veterans Memorial Fieldhouse; Huntington, WV
Jan 12, 1972	No. 20	DePauw	W 102–76	11–2	Veterans Memorial Fieldhouse (6,270); Huntington, WV
Jan 15, 1972	No. 20	at Morris Harvey	W 88–69	12–2	Charleston Civic Center (7,100); Charleston, WV
Jan 19, 1972	No. 16	Miami (OH)	W 81–63	13–2	Veterans Memorial Fieldhouse (6,333); Huntington, WV
Jan 22, 1972	No. 16	at Bowling Green	W 103–80	14–2	Anderson Arena (4,480); Bowling Green, OH
Jan 29, 1972	No. 14	Morris Harvey	W 78–68	15–2	Veterans Memorial Fieldhouse (6,473); Huntington, WV
Feb 3, 1972	No. 11	Cleveland State	W 102–70	16–2	Veterans Memorial Fieldhouse (6,312); Huntington, WV
Feb 5, 1972	No. 11	vs. Long Island	W 70–61	17–2	Madison Square Garden; New York, NY
Feb 8, 1972	No. 11	at Samford	W 92–79	18–2	Seibert Hall (3,100); Homewood, AL
Feb 12, 1972	No. 11	Bowling Green	W 91–67	19–2	Veterans Memorial Fieldhouse; Huntington, WV
Feb 16, 1972	No. 10	at Ohio	W 95–76	20–2	Convocation Center (10,965); Athens, OH
Feb 19, 1972	No. 10	at UNC Charlotte	W 89–69	21–2	Belk Gymnasium (3,750); Charlotte, NC
Feb 21, 1972	No. 10	at Saint Francis (PA)	W 95–80	22–2	Johnstown War Memorial Arena; Johnstown, PA
Feb 29, 1972	No. 9	UNC Charlotte	W 76–59	23–2	Veterans Memorial Fieldhouse (6,519); Huntington, WV
Mar 2, 1972	No. 9	at Miami (OH)	L 71–77	23–3	Millett Hall; Oxford, OH
NCAA tournament
Mar 11, 1972	No. 10	vs. No. 9 Southwestern Louisiana; First Round – Midwest Region	L 101–112	23–4	Pan American Center (3,976); Las Cruces, NM
*Non-conference game. ^{#}Rankings from AP Poll. (#) Tournament seedings in parentheses.
