= 1971–72 St. John's Redmen basketball team =

American college basketball season

1971–72 St. John's Redmen men's basketball

Lobo Classic Champions

1972 NIT, Fourth Place
- Conference: Independent
- Record: 19–11
- Head coach: Frank Mulzoff
- Assistant coach: Chuck McAuley
- Captain: Greg Cluess
- Home arena: Alumni Hall; Madison Square Garden

1971–72 NCAA University Division men's basketball independents standings
	Conf.				Overall
Team	W		L	PCT	W		L	PCT
No. 16 Oral Roberts		–		–	26	–	2	.929
No. 7 Marquette		–		–	25	–	4	.862
Hawaii		–		–	23	–	4	.852
No. 12 Marshall		–		–	23	–	4	.852
No. 10 Florida State		–		–	28	–	5	.848
Northern Illinois		–		–	21	–	4	.840
No. 6 South Carolina		–		–	24	–	5	.828
Duquesne		–		–	20	–	5	.800
Syracuse		–		–	22	–	6	.786
Providence		–		–	21	–	6	.778
Detroit		–		–	18	–	6	.750
Houston		–		–	20	–	7	.741
Jacksonville		–		–	20	–	8	.714
No. 15 Villanova		–		–	20	–	8	.714
Pan American		–		–	17	–	7	.708
Niagara		–		–	21	–	9	.700
Penn State		–		–	17	–	8	.680
Fordham		–		–	18	–	9	.667
St. Bonaventure		–		–	16	–	8	.667
Cincinnati		–		–	17	–	9	.654
Georgia Southern		–		–	17	–	9	.654
Colgate		–		–	15	–	8	.652
St. John's		–		–	19	–	11	.633
Fairleigh Dickinson		–		–	15	–	9	.625
Illinois State		–		–	16	–	10	.615
Virginia Tech		–		–	16	–	10	.615
Canisius		–		–	15	–	11	.577
Creighton		–		–	15	–	11	.577
Holy Cross		–		–	15	–	11	.577
Oklahoma City		–		–	16	–	12	.571
Loyola (LA)		–		–	14	–	11	.560
Rutgers		–		–	14	–	11	.560
West Virginia		–		–	13	–	11	.542
Hardin–Simmons		–		–	14	–	12	.538
DePaul		–		–	12	–	11	.522
Centenary		–		–	13	–	12	.520
Long Island		–		–	13	–	12	.520
Boston College		–		–	13	–	13	.500
Dayton		–		–	13	–	13	.500
Pittsburgh		–		–	12	–	12	.500
Air Force		–		–	12	–	13	.480
Fairfield		–		–	12	–	13	.480
Saint Francis (PA)		–		–	12	–	13	.480
Saint Peter's		–		–	12	–	13	.480
Indiana State		–		–	12	–	14	.462
St. Francis (NY)		–		–	12	–	14	.462
Utah State		–		–	12	–	14	.462
Xavier		–		–	12	–	14	.462
Army		–		–	11	–	13	.458
Manhattan		–		–	11	–	13	.458
George Washington		–		–	11	–	14	.440
Navy		–		–	10	–	13	.435
Denver		–		–	11	–	15	.423
Portland		–		–	10	–	16	.385
Seton Hall		–		–	10	–	16	.385
Southern Illinois		–		–	10	–	16	.385
Ball State		–		–	9	–	15	.375
Loyola (IL)		–		–	8	–	14	.364
Tulane		–		–	8	–	18	.308
Boston University		–		–	7	–	16	.304
South Alabama		–		–	7	–	17	.292
Iona		–		–	6	–	17	.261
Butler		–		–	6	–	20	.231
Georgia Tech		–		–	6	–	20	.231
Notre Dame		–		–	6	–	20	.231
Stetson		–		–	6	–	20	.231
Georgetown		–		–	3	–	23	.115
Rankings from AP Poll

The 1971–72 St. John's Redmen basketball team represented St. John's University during the 1971–72 NCAA University Division men's basketball season. The team was coached by Frank Mulzoff in his second year at the school. St. John's home games are played at Alumni Hall and Madison Square Garden.

== Roster ==
1971–72 St. John's Red Storm men's basketball team
Players
Coaches

Pos.	#	Name	Height	Weight	Year	Previous school	Hometown
F	-	Dennis McIntyre (redshirt)	6 ft 3 in (1.91 m)	—	Jr	Monsignor McClancy/Nassau	Bayside, NY
G	5	Richard Lyons	6 ft 0 in (1.83 m)	165 lb (75 kg)	Sr	Holy Cross	New Hyde Park, NY
G	10	Larry Jenkins	5 ft 11 in (1.8 m)	160 lb (73 kg)	Jr	Andrew Jackson	Queens Village, NY
G	12	Kevin Raftery	6 ft 2 in (1.88 m)	—	Sr	Archbishop Molloy	Briarwood, NJ
G/F	15	Billy Schaeffer	6 ft 5 in (1.96 m)	200 lb (91 kg)	Jr	Holy Cross	Queens, NY
G	20	Mike Keilty	6 ft 4 in (1.93 m)	190 lb (86 kg)	Sr	Holy Trinity	Woodside, NY
G	22	Frank Hoehleinn	6 ft 3 in (1.91 m)	175 lb (79 kg)	Sr	Sanford H. Calhoun	Merrick, NY
C	24	Bill Phillips	7 ft 0 in (2.13 m)	215 lb (98 kg)	Sr	Jamaica	Hollis, NY
F	33	Mel Davis	6 ft 7 in (2.01 m)	217 lb (98 kg)	Jr	Boys	Brooklyn, NY
F/C	34	Ed Searcy	6 ft 6 in (1.98 m)	210 lb (95 kg)	RS So	Power Memorial/Duquesne	New York, NY
F/C	44	Greg Cluess (C)	6 ft 9 in (2.06 m)	215 lb (98 kg)	Sr	St. Agnes (NY)	West Hempstead, NY
F	55	Tony Prince	6 ft 9 in (2.06 m)	190 lb (86 kg)	Jr	Bishop Loughlin	South Ozone Park, NY

Head coach

- Frank Mulzoff (St. John's, '51)

Assistant coach(es)

- Chuck McAuley
- Joel de Angelis (freshmen coach)

Legend

- (C) Team captain
- (S) Suspended
- (I) Ineligible
- (W) Walk-on
- Injured
- Current redshirt

== Schedule and results ==
Date time, TV	Rank^{#}	Opponent^{#}	Result	Record	Site city, state
Regular Season
12/04/71*	No. 17	Vanderbilt	W 98-81	1-0	Alumni Hall; Queens, NY
12/07/71*	No. 14	at Georgetown	W 107-67	2-0	McDonough Gymnasium; Washington, D.C.
12/11/71*	No. 14	Seton Hall	W 103-84	3-0	Alumni Hall; Queens, NY
12/14/71*	No. 8	American	W 83-76 ^{OT}	4-0	Alumni Hall; Queens, NY
12/17/71*	No. 8	vs. Rhode Island; Marshall Invitational semifinal	W 85-75	5-0	Veterans Memorial Fieldhouse; Huntington, WV
12/18/71*	No. 8	at Marshall; Marshall Invitational Championship	L 107-110 ^{OT}	5-1	Veterans Memorial Fieldhouse; Huntington, WV
12/22/71*	No. 10	vs. Creighton; Lobo Classic Semifinal	W 94-73	6-1	University Arena; Albuquerque, NM
12/23/71*	No. 10	at New Mexico; Lobo Classic Championship	W 95-92	7-1	University Arena; Albuquerque, NM
12/29/71*	No. 9	vs. Harvard; Maryland Invitational semifinal	W 94-88	8-1	Cole Field House; College Park, MD
12/30/71*	No. 9	at No. 16 Maryland; Maryland Invitational Championship	L 69-90	8-2	Cole Field House; College Park, MD
01/04/72*	No. 17	Davidson	L 84-88	8-3	Alumni Hall; Queens, NY
01/08/72*	No. 17	Syracuse	L 83-86	8-4	Alumni Hall; Queens, NY
01/15/72*		St. Francis (NY)	W 112-55	9-4	Alumni Hall; Queens, NY
01/20/72*		at Temple	L 65-79	9-5	The Palestra; Philadelphia, PA
01/22/72*		No. 15 Villanova	W 71-69	10-5	Alumni Hall; Queens, NY
01/25/72*		Hofstra	W 72-64	11-5	Alumni Hall; Queens, NY
01/29/72*		at Dartmouth	W 100-66	12-5	Alumni Gymnasium; Hanover, NH
01/31/72*		at Rhode Island	W 86-73	13-5	Keaney Gymnasium; Kingston, RI
02/05/72*		Army	L 70-73	13-6	Alumni Hall; Queens, NY
02/08/72*		at Notre Dame	W 86-75	14-6	Athletic & Convocation Center; Notre Dame, IN
02/12/72*		Fordham	W 78-60	15-6	Alumni Hall; Queens, NY
02/15/72*		at Boston College	L 66-70	15-7	Roberts Center; Chestnut Hill, MA
02/19/72*		at Niagara	W 93-90	16-7	NU Student Center; Lewiston, NY
02/22/72*		Holy Cross	L 73-76	16-8	Alumni Hall; Queens, NY
02/26/72*		St. Joseph's	W 77-70	17-8	Alumni Hall; Queens, NY
03/02/72*		at Providence	L 65-73	17-9	Alumni Hall; Providence, RI
NIT Tournament
03/18/72*		vs. Missouri; NIT first round	W 82-81 ^{OT}	18-9	Madison Square Garden; New York, NY
03/21/72*		vs. No. 16 Oral Roberts; NIT Quarterfinal	W 94-78	19-9	Madison Square Garden; New York, NY
03/23/72*		vs. Niagara; NIT Semifinal	L 67-69	19-10	Madison Square Garden; New York, NY
03/25/72*		vs. Jacksonville; NIT third-place game	L 80-83	19-11	Madison Square Garden; New York, NY
*Non-conference game. ^{#}Rankings from AP Poll. (#) Tournament seedings in parentheses.

== Team players drafted into the NBA ==
Round	Pick	Player	NBA club
6	91	Greg Cluess	New York Knicks
