= 1971–72 Houston Cougars men's basketball team =

American college basketball season

1971–72 Houston Cougars men's basketball
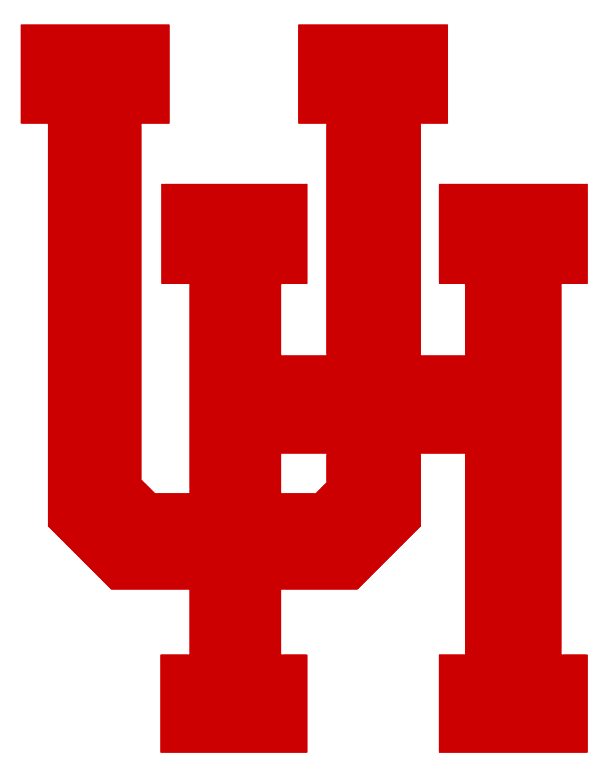

NCAA tournament, First Round
- Conference: Independent
- Record: 20–7
- Head coach: Guy Lewis (16th season)
- Assistant coaches: Harvey Pate; Don Schverak
- Home arena: Hofheinz Pavilion

1971–72 NCAA University Division men's basketball independents standings
	Conf.				Overall
Team	W		L	PCT	W		L	PCT
No. 16 Oral Roberts		–		–	26	–	2	.929
No. 7 Marquette		–		–	25	–	4	.862
Hawaii		–		–	23	–	4	.852
No. 12 Marshall		–		–	23	–	4	.852
No. 10 Florida State		–		–	28	–	5	.848
Northern Illinois		–		–	21	–	4	.840
No. 6 South Carolina		–		–	24	–	5	.828
Duquesne		–		–	20	–	5	.800
Syracuse		–		–	22	–	6	.786
Providence		–		–	21	–	6	.778
Detroit		–		–	18	–	6	.750
Houston		–		–	20	–	7	.741
Jacksonville		–		–	20	–	8	.714
No. 15 Villanova		–		–	20	–	8	.714
Pan American		–		–	17	–	7	.708
Niagara		–		–	21	–	9	.700
Penn State		–		–	17	–	8	.680
Fordham		–		–	18	–	9	.667
St. Bonaventure		–		–	16	–	8	.667
Cincinnati		–		–	17	–	9	.654
Georgia Southern		–		–	17	–	9	.654
Colgate		–		–	15	–	8	.652
St. John's		–		–	19	–	11	.633
Fairleigh Dickinson		–		–	15	–	9	.625
Illinois State		–		–	16	–	10	.615
Virginia Tech		–		–	16	–	10	.615
Canisius		–		–	15	–	11	.577
Creighton		–		–	15	–	11	.577
Holy Cross		–		–	15	–	11	.577
Oklahoma City		–		–	16	–	12	.571
Loyola (LA)		–		–	14	–	11	.560
Rutgers		–		–	14	–	11	.560
West Virginia		–		–	13	–	11	.542
Hardin–Simmons		–		–	14	–	12	.538
DePaul		–		–	12	–	11	.522
Centenary		–		–	13	–	12	.520
Long Island		–		–	13	–	12	.520
Boston College		–		–	13	–	13	.500
Dayton		–		–	13	–	13	.500
Pittsburgh		–		–	12	–	12	.500
Air Force		–		–	12	–	13	.480
Fairfield		–		–	12	–	13	.480
Saint Francis (PA)		–		–	12	–	13	.480
Saint Peter's		–		–	12	–	13	.480
Indiana State		–		–	12	–	14	.462
St. Francis (NY)		–		–	12	–	14	.462
Utah State		–		–	12	–	14	.462
Xavier		–		–	12	–	14	.462
Army		–		–	11	–	13	.458
Manhattan		–		–	11	–	13	.458
George Washington		–		–	11	–	14	.440
Navy		–		–	10	–	13	.435
Denver		–		–	11	–	15	.423
Portland		–		–	10	–	16	.385
Seton Hall		–		–	10	–	16	.385
Southern Illinois		–		–	10	–	16	.385
Ball State		–		–	9	–	15	.375
Loyola (IL)		–		–	8	–	14	.364
Tulane		–		–	8	–	18	.308
Boston University		–		–	7	–	16	.304
South Alabama		–		–	7	–	17	.292
Iona		–		–	6	–	17	.261
Butler		–		–	6	–	20	.231
Georgia Tech		–		–	6	–	20	.231
Notre Dame		–		–	6	–	20	.231
Stetson		–		–	6	–	20	.231
Georgetown		–		–	3	–	23	.115
Rankings from AP Poll

The 1971–72 Houston Cougars men's basketball team represented the University of Houston in NCAA University Division competition in the 1971–72 season.

Houston, coached by Guy Lewis, played its home games in the Hofheinz Pavilion in Houston, Texas, and was then an Independent.

== Roster ==
1971–72 Houston Cougars men's basketball team
Players
Coaches

Pos.	#	Name	Height	Weight	Year	Previous school	Hometown
F	12	Dwight Jones	6 ft 10 in (2.08 m)	210 lb (95 kg)	Jr	Wheatley HS	Houston, Texas
F	42	Dwight Davis	6 ft 8 in (2.03 m)	220 lb (100 kg)	Sr	Worthing HS	Houston, Texas
F	52	Steve Newsome	6 ft 8 in (2.03 m)	—	Jr		Columbia, Missouri

Head coach

- Guy Lewis (Houston)

Assistant coach(es)

- Harvey Pate (Oklahoma State)
- Don Schverak (Houston)

Legend

- (C) Team captain
- (S) Suspended
- (I) Ineligible
- (W) Walk-on
- Injured
- Current redshirt

Roster

== Schedule and results ==
Date time, TV	Rank^{#}	Opponent^{#}	Result	Record	Site city, state
Regular season
Dec 1, 1971	No. 7	at Stanford	W 87–67	1–0	Maples Pavilion; Stanford, California
Dec 2, 1971	No. 7	at California	L 81–82 ^{2OT}	1–1	Harmon Gym; Berkeley, California
Dec 4, 1971	No. 7	Tennessee	W 67–65	2–1	Hofheinz Pavilion; Houston, Texas
Dec 6, 1971	No. 12	at Southwestern Louisiana	L 88–97	2–2	Blackham Coliseum; Lafayette, Louisiana
Dec 10, 1971	No. 12	No. 17 Arizona State	L 97–98	2–3	Hofheinz Pavilion; Houston, Texas
Dec 11, 1971	No. 12	No. 17 Arizona State	W 88–76	3–3	Hofheinz Pavilion; Houston, Texas
Dec 20, 1971		Washington State	W 84–73	4–3	Hofheinz Pavilion; Houston, Texas
Dec 27, 1971		LSU; Bluebonnet Classic	W 100–66	5–3	Hofheinz Pavilion; Houston, Texas
Dec 28, 1971		Michigan State; Bluebonnet Classic	W 106–73	6–3	Hofheinz Pavilion; Houston, Texas
Jan 3, 1972		at Dayton	L 69–73	6–4	UD Arena; Dayton, Ohio
Jan 6, 1972		Colorado	W 70–66	7–4	Hofheinz Pavilion; Houston, Texas
Jan 8, 1972		vs. Rice	W 101–73	8–4	Houston Astrodome; Houston, Texas
Jan 16, 1972		at No. 12 Florida State	L 79–86	8–5	Tully Gymnasium; Tallahassee, Florida
Jan 17, 1972		at Southern Miss	W 115–84	9–5	Reed Green Coliseum; Hattiesburg, Mississippi
Jan 27, 1972		Southern Miss	W 102–63	10–5	Hofheinz Pavilion; Houston, Texas
Jan 29, 1972		LIU	W 104–79	11–5	Hofheinz Pavilion; Houston, Texas
Feb 4, 1972		No. 12 Florida State	W 94–86	12–5	Hofheinz Pavilion; Houston, Texas
Feb 7, 1972		Denver	W 98–69	13–5	Hofheinz Pavilion; Houston, Texas
Feb 10, 1972		Centenary (LA)	W 100–83	14–5	Hofheinz Pavilion; Houston, Texas
Feb 14, 1972		Loyola (LA)	W 104–86	15–5	Hofheinz Pavilion; Houston, Texas
Feb 17, 1972		at Centenary (LA)	W 93–82	16–5	Gold Dome; Shreveport, Louisiana
Feb 19, 1972		No. 7 South Carolina	W 95–85	17–5	Hofheinz Pavilion; Houston, Texas
Feb 24, 1972	No. 16	Texas A&I–Corpus Christi	W 105–81	18–5	Hofheinz Pavilion; Houston, Texas
Feb 26, 1972	No. 16	Houston Baptist	W 96–79	19–5	Hofheinz Pavilion; Houston, Texas
Feb 28, 1972	No. 13	at Jacksonville	L 108–110 ^{OT}	19–6	Jacksonville Coliseum; Jacksonville, Florida
Mar 4, 1972	No. 13	at Denver	W 94–91	20–6	DU Fieldhouse; Denver, Colorado
NCAA tournament
Mar 11, 1972	No. 19	vs. Texas; Regional quarterfinals – First round	L 74–85	20–7	Pan American Center; Las Cruces, New Mexico
*Non-conference game. ^{#}Rankings from AP Poll. (#) Tournament seedings in parentheses. All times are in Central Time.

== Rankings ==
Ranking movements Legend: ██ Increase in ranking ██ Decrease in ranking — = Not ranked
	Week															
Poll	Pre	1	2	3	4	5	6	7	8	9	10	11	12	13	14	Final
AP	7	12	20	—	—	—	—	—	—	—	—	—	16	13	19	—
Coaches	6	10	—	—	—	—	—	—	—	—	—	19	17	14	15	—
