= Bernie Ockene =

American basketball coach

Biographical details
- Born: March 23, 1919
- Died: June 26, 1974 (aged 55); Bayonne, New Jersey, U.S.
- Education: Seton Hall University (1949)

Coaching career (HC unless noted)

Basketball
- 19??–196?: Bayonne HS
- 196?–1972: Saint Peter's (assistant)
- 1972–1974: Saint Peter's

Head coaching record
- Overall: 16–36

Bernard Ockene (March 23, 1919 – April 26, 1974) was an American college basketball head coach for the Saint Peter's Peacocks between 1972 and 1974. When Don Kennedy was fired, then-assistant Ockene got promoted to lead the team. He coached them for the 1972–73 and 1973–74 seasons, compiling identical 8–18 records. Prior to Saint Peter's, Ockene was a successful coach at Bayonne High School in a very competitive North Jersey basketball environment.

Ockene died from a heart attack on April 26, 1974 in Bayonne Hospital. He was 55 years old.

== Head coaching record ==
Record table
Season	Team	Overall	Conference	Standing	Postseason
Saint Peter's Peacocks (Independent) (1972–1974)
1972–73	Saint Peter's	8–18			
1973–74	Saint Peter's	8–18			
Saint Peter's:		16–36 (.308)			
Total:		16–36 (.308)			
