= Mike Laughna =

American basketball player

Mike Laughna (born Frederick Michael Laughna; July 15, 1950 – August 28, 2012) was a former basketball player for Georgetown University.

Laughna, who attended Saint Benedict's Preparatory School in Newark, New Jersey, remains one of the top scorers in Georgetown history, ranked above NBA star Dikembe Mutombo. At the time of his graduation, Laughna held most of Georgetown's scoring records, but the advent of the three-point shot and the slam dunk made it possible for future players to accumulate points more rapidly.

Laughna is a member of the Georgetown University Basketball Hall of Fame, and is ranked 15th on Georgetown's "Top 100 Players" list. He was also included as an honorable mention on the All Century Team.

On February 11, 1971, in a game against NYU, Laughna scored a career high 35 points. Fellow Georgetown alumnus Patrick Ewing also scored 35 points as his career high.

Laughna has played professional basketball for a number of European teams. He died in 2012.

== Georgetown University records ==
The team's leading scorer in 1971 and 1972 Laughna is better remembered for his strength as a rebounder. He is eighth in all-time rebounds and third in all-time rebounding average, as well as one of only five players to lead their team in rebounding for three consecutive seasons. He is one of only three to average at least ten points and ten rebounds per game over his career, and one of only two Georgetown players whose scoring and rebounding averages are among the top ten. He is the only player ever to average double figures in rebounds in each of his varsity years. He also holds five of the 30 single game rebounding records.
