= 1971–72 Kansas Jayhawks men's basketball team =

American college basketball season

1971–72 Kansas Jayhawks men's basketball
- Conference: Big Eight Conference
- Record: 11–15 (7–7 Big 8)
- Head coach: Ted Owens (8th season)
- Assistant coaches: Bob Frederick (2nd season); Sam Miranda (6th season)
- Captain: Bud Stallworth
- Home arena: Allen Fieldhouse

1971–72 Big Eight Conference men's basketball standings
	Conf.				Overall
Team	W		L	PCT	W		L	PCT
Kansas State	12	–	2	.857	19	–	9	.679
Missouri	10	–	4	.714	21	–	6	.778
Oklahoma	9	–	5	.643	14	–	12	.538
Nebraska	7	–	7	.500	14	–	12	.538
Kansas	7	–	7	.500	11	–	15	.423
Iowa State	5	–	9	.357	12	–	14	.462
Colorado	4	–	10	.286	7	–	19	.269
Oklahoma State	2	–	12	.143	4	–	22	.154
Rankings from AP Poll

The 1971–72 Kansas Jayhawks men's basketball team represented the University of Kansas during the 1971–72 college men's basketball season.

== Roster ==
- Bud Stallworth
- Tom Kivisto
- Randy Canfield
- Aubrey Nash
- Wilson Barrow
- Dave Taynor
- Neal Mask
- Mark Mathews
- Fred Bosilevac Jr.
- Dale Haase
- Ken Franklin
- Randy Culberston
- Jerry House

== Schedule ==
Date time, TV	Rank^{#}	Opponent^{#}	Result	Record	Site city, state
December 1*	No. 14	Xavier	W 75–57	1-0	Allen Fieldhouse; Lawrence, KS
December 4*	No. 14	Kentucky	L 69–79	1-1	Allen Fieldhouse; Lawrence, KS
December 6*	No. 14	at Indiana	L 56–59	1-2	Assembly Hall; Bloomington, IN
December 8*		Notre Dame	W 88–72	2-2	Allen Fieldhouse; Lawrence, KS
December 11*		Louisville	L 65–74	2-3	Allen Fieldhouse; Lawrence, KS
December 17*		BYU	W 83–67	3-3	Allen Fieldhouse; Lawrence, KS
December 18*		USC	L 77–87	3-4	Allen Fieldhouse; Lawrence, KS
December 28*		vs. Iowa State	L 88–91	3-5	Kansas City, MO
December 29*		vs. Oklahoma	L 69–97	3-6	Kansas City, MO
December 30*		vs. Oklahoma State	L 65–66	3-7	Kansas City, MO
January 3*		at Iowa	L 68–81	3-8	Iowa City, Iowa
January 15		Oklahoma State	W 85–58	4-8 (1-0)	Allen Fieldhouse; Lawrence, KS
January 17		Kansas State; Sunflower Showdown	W 66–63 ^{2OT}	5-8 (2-0)	Allen Fieldhouse; Lawrence, KS
January 22		at Colorado	L 69–74	5-9 (2-1)	Boulder, CO
January 24		Iowa State	W 74–71	6-9 (3-1)	Allen Fieldhouse; Lawrence, KS
January 29		Nebraska	W 57–77 ^{OT}	7-9 (4-1)	Allen Fieldhouse; Lawrence, KS
February 1		at Missouri; Border War	L 60–64	7-10 (4-2)	Columbia, MO
February 5		at Iowa State	L 83–84	7-11 (4-3)	Ames, IA
February 7*		Georgia Tech	W 93–65	8-11	Allen Fieldhouse; Lawrence, KS
February 12		Oklahoma	W 77–74	9-11 (5-3)	Allen Fieldhouse; Lawrence, KS
February 15		at Kansas State; Sunflower Showdown	L 66–78	9-12 (5-4)	Manhattan, KS
February 19		at Nebraska	L 78–99	9-13 (5-5)	Lincoln, NE
February 21		Colorado	W 71–59	10-13 (6-5)	Allen Fieldhouse; Lawrence, KS
February 26		Missouri; Border War	W 93–80	11-13 (7-5)	Allen Fieldhouse; Lawrence, KS
March 4		at Oklahoma State	L 72–76	11-14 (7-6)	Stillwater, OK
March 6		at Oklahoma	L 82–84 ^{2OT}	11-15 (7-7)	Norman, OK
*Non-conference game. ^{#}Rankings from AP Poll. (#) Tournament seedings in parentheses.

== Statistics ==
Leading scorers

- Bud Stallworth (6-5 Sr F) 25.3
- Tom Kivisto (6-3 So G) 8.9
- Randy Canfield (6-9 Jr C) 7.6
- Aubrey Nash (6-1 Sr G) 6.7
- Wilson Barrow (6-6 Jr F) 6.4
