= 1971–72 Ohio Bobcats men's basketball team =

American college basketball season

1971–72 Ohio Bobcats men's basketball

MAC Regular Season champions

NCAA tournament, First Round
- Conference: Mid-American Conference
- Record: 15–11 (7–3 MAC)
- Head coach: Jim Snyder (23rd season)
- Home arena: Convocation Center

1971–72 Mid-American Conference men's basketball standings
	Conf.				Overall
Team	W		L	PCT	W		L	PCT
Ohio	7	–	3	.700	15	–	11	.577
Toledo	7	–	3	.700	18	–	7	.720
Kent State	6	–	4	.600	7	–	17	.292
Western Michigan	5	–	5	.500	10	–	14	.417
Miami (Ohio)	4	–	6	.400	12	–	12	.500
Bowling Green State	1	–	9	.100	4	–	20	.167
Rankings from AP Poll

The 1971–72 Ohio Bobcats men's basketball team represented Ohio University as a member of the Mid-American Conference in the college basketball season of 1971–72. The team was coached by Jim Snyder and played their home games at Convocation Center. The Bobcats finished with a record of 15–11 and won MAC regular season title with a conference record of 7–3. They received a bid to the NCAA tournament, where they lost to Marquette in the First Round.

== Schedule ==
Date time, TV	Rank^{#}	Opponent^{#}	Result	Record	Site (attendance) city, state
Regular Season
12/1/1971*		Muskingum	W 76–66	1–0	
12/4/1971*		at Northwestern	L 65–76	1–1	
12/11/1971*		No. 4 Ohio State	W 79–68	2–1	
12/15/1971*		No. 12 Indiana	W 79–70	3–1	
12/20/1971*	No. 17	at Michigan; Michigan Tourney	L 81–87	3–2	
12/21/1971*	No. 17	vs. Detroit; Michigan Tourney	L 77–84	3–3	
12/23/1971*	No. 17	at Cincinnati	L 67–104	3–4	
12/30/1972*		at No. 17 Marshall	L 81–88	3–5	
1/4/1972*		Missouri	L 76–78	3–6	
MAC regular season
1/8/1972		at Bowling Green	W 91–69	4–6 (1–0)	
1/12/1972		Kent State	W 85–74	5–6 (2–0)	
1/15/1972		Toledo	W 71–64	6–6 (3–0)	
1/19/1972*		Virginia Tech	W 88–79	7–6	
1/22/1972		Miami (OH)	L 77–91	7–7 (3–1)	
1/29/1972		at Kent State	L 77–88	7-8 (3–2)	
2/1/1972*		VMI	W 98–60	8-8	
2/5/1972		Western Michigan	W 80–79	9–8 (4–2)	
2/8/1972*		MacMurray	W 108–69	10–8 (5–2)	
2/12/1972		at Miami (OH)	W 69–66 ^{OT}	11–8 (6–2)	
2/16/1972*		No. 10 Marshall	L 79–95	11–9	
2/22/1972*		Loyola (IL)	W 84–79	12–9	
2/26/1972		at Toledo	W 66–56	13–9 (7–2)	
3/1/1972		at Western Michigan	L 83–100	13–10 (7–3)	
3/4/1972		Bowling Green	W 105–84	14–10 (8–3)	
3/7/1972		at Toledo	W 69–67 ^{OT}	15–10 (9–3)	
NCAA Tournament
3/11/1972*		vs. No. 7 Marquette	L 49–73	15–11	
*Non-conference game. ^{#}Rankings from AP Poll. (#) Tournament seedings in parentheses. All times are in Eastern Time.

== Statistics ==
=== Team statistics ===
Final 1971–72 statistics

Record	Ohio	OPP
Scoring	2053	2011
Scoring Average	78.96	77.35
Field goals – Att	792–1755	788–1757
Free throws – Att	469–668	435–636
Rebounds	1195	1142
Assists		
Turnovers		
Steals		
Blocked Shots		

=== Player statistics ===
			Minutes		Scoring		Total FGs			Free-Throws			Rebounds						
Player	GP	GS	Tot	Avg	Pts	Avg	FG	FGA	Pct	FT	FTA	Pct	Tot	Avg	A	PF	TO	Stl	Blk
Tom Corde	26	-			450	17.3	181	393	0.461	88	112	0.786	79	3.0		57			
Todd Lalich	26	-			329	12.7	124	260	0.477	81	103	0.786	134	5.2		88			
Tom Riccardi	26	-			323	12.4	132	301	0.439	61	105	0.581	167	6.4		66			
Denny Rusch	25	-			224	9.0	79	183	0.432	66	96	0.688	170	6.8		99			
Bob Howell	25	-			217	8.7	80	183	0.437	57	80	0.713	76	3.0		51			
Dave Ball	23	-			209	9.1	80	171	0.468	49	72	0.681	124	5.4		49			
Bill Brown	26	-			182	7.0	76	156	0.487	30	43	0.698	161	6.2		43			
Denny Thompson	6	-			41	6.8	15	43	0.349	12	15	0.800	11	1.8		17			
Chris Collins	8	-			18	2.3	7	15	0.467	4	5	0.800	11	1.4		7			
Bernard Rumpke	10	-			18	1.8	6	17	0.353	6	11	0.545	13	1.3		12			
Dave Strack	12	-			17	1.4	7	19	0.368	3	8	0.375	6	0.5		8			
Jeff Knight	9	-			11	1.2	2	7	0.286	7	11	0.636	14	1.6		3			
Floyd Carter	6	-			9	1.5	3	11	0.273	3	4	0.750	5	0.8		1			
Ken Heiby	2	-			2	1.0	1	1	1.000	0	0	0.000	0	0.0		3			
Total	26	-	-	-	2053	79.0	792	1755	0.451	469	668	0.702	1195	46.0		505			
Opponents	26	-	-	-	2011	77.3	788	1757	0.448	435	636	0.684	1142	43.9		501			

Legend
GP	Games played	GS	Games started	Avg	Average per game
FG	Field-goals made	FGA	Field-goal attempts	Off	Offensive rebounds
Def	Defensive rebounds	A	Assists	TO	Turnovers
Blk	Blocks	Stl	Steals	High	Team high
