= 1972 NCAA University Division basketball tournament =

Edition of USA college basketball tournament

- NCAA logo from 1971 to 1979
- Teams: 25
- Finals site: Los Angeles Memorial Sports Arena, Los Angeles, California
- Champions: UCLA Bruins (8th title, 8th title game, 9th Final Four)
- Runner-up: Florida State Seminoles (1st title game, 1st Final Four)
- Semifinalists: Louisville Cardinals (2nd Final Four); North Carolina Tar Heels (6th Final Four)
- Winning coach: John Wooden (8th title)
- MOP: Bill Walton (UCLA)
- Attendance: 147,304
- Top scorer: Jim Price (Louisville) (103 points)

The 1972 NCAA University Division basketball tournament involved 25 schools playing in single-elimination play to determine the national champion of NCAA University Division (now Division I) college basketball. The 34th annual edition of the tournament began on Saturday, March 11, and ended with the championship game at the Memorial Sports Arena in Los Angeles on Saturday, March 25. A total of 29 games were played, including a third-place game in each region and a national third-place game.

Led by longtime head coach John Wooden, the undefeated UCLA Bruins won the national title with an 81–76 victory in the final game over Florida State, coached by Hugh Durham. Sophomore center Bill Walton of UCLA was named the tournament's Most Outstanding Player; the first of two consecutive.

On a historically significant note, the Southwestern Louisiana Ragin' Cajuns made the tournament in their first season of eligibility for postseason play; the next to achieve this feat was North Dakota State in 2009. SW Louisiana (renamed the University of Louisiana at Lafayette in 1999; the school's athletic teams have been referred to as "Louisiana" since then) also made the tournament in 1973, but due to major infractions that resulted in the basketball program receiving the NCAA death penalty (and very nearly expelled from the NCAA altogether), both appearances have since been vacated and the records expunged.

This was the last year in which the championship game was played on Saturday; it moved to Monday night in 1973. This was also the last year the national semifinals were televised regionally on a Thursday or Friday night (The first game was televised to the Eastern and Central time zones and the second to the Mountain and Pacific time zones. Markets of participating teams were permitted to televise both games if the team of local interest was playing in the opposite window; in 1972, Louisville's NBC affiliate WAVE broadcast both games live, as the Cardinals' semifinal vs. UCLA tipped off at 11:15 p.m. Eastern.).

== Schedule and venues ==
The following are the sites that were selected to host each round of the 1972 tournament:

First round

- March 11
  - East Region
    - Alumni Hall, Jamaica, New York (Host: St. John's University)
    - Jadwin Gymnasium, Princeton, New Jersey (Host: Princeton University)
    - William & Mary Hall, Williamsburg, Virginia (Host: The College of William & Mary)
  - Mideast Region
    - Stokely Athletic Center, Knoxville, Tennessee (Host: University of Tennessee)
  - Midwest Region
    - Pan American Center, Las Cruces, New Mexico (Host: New Mexico State University)
  - West Region
    - ASISU Minidome, Pocatello, Idaho (Hosts: Idaho State University, Big Sky Conference)

Regional semifinals, 3rd-place games, and finals (Sweet Sixteen and Elite Eight)

- March 16 and 18
  - East Regional, WVU Coliseum, Morgantown, West Virginia (Host: West Virginia University)
  - Mideast Regional, University of Dayton Arena, Dayton, Ohio (Host: University of Dayton)
  - Midwest Regional, Hilton Coliseum, Ames, Iowa (Host: Iowa State University)
  - West Regional, Marriott Center, Provo, Utah (Host: Brigham Young University)

National semifinals, 3rd-place game, and championship (Final Four and championship)

- March 23 and 25
  - Los Angeles Memorial Sports Arena, Los Angeles, California (Hosts: University of Southern California, Pacific-8 Conference)

== Teams ==
| Region | Team | Coach | Conference | Finished | Final Opponent | Score |
East
| East | East Carolina | Tom Quinn | Southern | First round | Villanova | L 85–70 |
| East | North Carolina | Dean Smith | Atlantic Coast | Third Place | Louisville | W 105–91 |
| East | Penn | Chuck Daly | Ivy League | Regional Runner-up | North Carolina | L 73–59 |
| East | Providence | Dave Gavitt | Independent | First round | Penn | L 76–60 |
| East | South Carolina | Frank McGuire | Independent | Regional third place | Villanova | W 90–78 |
| East | Temple | Harry Litwack | Middle Atlantic | First round | South Carolina | L 53–51 |
| East | Villanova | Jack Kraft | Independent | Regional Fourth Place | South Carolina | L 90–78 |
Mideast
| Mideast | Eastern Kentucky | Guy Strong | Ohio Valley | First round | Florida State | L 83–81 |
| Mideast | Florida State | Hugh Durham | Independent | Runner Up | UCLA | L 81–76 |
| Mideast | Kentucky | Adolph Rupp | Southeastern | Regional Runner-up | Florida State | L 73–54 |
| Mideast | Marquette | Al McGuire | Independent | Regional Fourth Place | Minnesota | L 77–72 |
| Mideast | Minnesota | Bill Musselman | Big Ten | Regional third place | Marquette | W 77–72 |
| Mideast | Ohio | James Snyder | Mid-American | First round | Marquette | L 73–49 |
Midwest
| Midwest | Houston | Guy Lewis | Independent | First round | Texas | L 85–74 |
| Midwest | Kansas State | Jack Hartman | Big Eight | Regional Runner-up | Louisville | L 72–65 |
| Midwest | Southwestern Louisiana (Vacated) | Beryl Shipley | Southland | ~~Regional third place~~ | Texas | ~~W 100–70~~ |
| Midwest | Louisville | Denny Crum | Missouri Valley | Fourth Place | North Carolina | L 105–91 |
| Midwest | Marshall | Carl Tacy | Independent | First round | Southwestern Louisiana | L 112–101 |
| Midwest | Texas | Leon Black | Southwest | Regional Fourth Place | Southwestern Louisiana | L 100–70 |
West
| West | BYU | Stan Watts | Western Athletic | First round | Long Beach State | L 95–90 |
| West | Hawaii | Red Rocha | Independent | First round | Weber State | L 91–64 |
| West | Long Beach State | Jerry Tarkanian | Pacific Coast | Regional Runner-up | UCLA | L 73–57 |
| West | San Francisco | Bob Gaillard | West Coast | Regional third place | Weber State | W 74–64 |
| West | UCLA | John Wooden | Pacific-8 | Champion | Florida State | W 81–76 |
| West | Weber State | Gene Visscher | Big Sky | Regional Fourth Place | San Francisco | L 74–64 |

== Bracket ==
* – Denotes overtime period

=== East region ===
Quarterfinals
South Carolina | 53
Temple | 51
Penn | 76
Providence | 60
Villanova | 85
East Carolina | 70

Semifinals
North Carolina | 92
South Carolina | 69
Penn | 78
Villanova | 67

Finals
North Carolina | 73
Penn | 59
East Regional third place
South Carolina | 90
Villanova | 78

=== Mideast region ===
Quarterfinals
Florida State | 83
Eastern Kentucky | 81
Marquette | 73
Ohio | 49

Semifinals
Minnesota# | 56
Florida State | 70
Kentucky | 85
Marquette | 69

Finals
Florida State | 73
Kentucky | 54
Mideast Regional third place
Minnesota# | 77
Marquette | 72

# - Minnesota vacated its appearance in the 1972 tournament.

=== Midwest region ===
Quarterfinals
Southwestern Louisiana | 112
Marshall | 101
Texas | 85
Houston | 74

Semifinals
Louisville | 88
Southwestern Louisiana | 84
Kansas State | 66
Texas | 55

Finals
Louisville | 72
Kansas State | 65
Midwest Regional third place
Southwestern Louisiana | 100
Texas | 70

=== West region ===
Quarterfinals
Weber State | 91
Hawaii | 64
Long Beach State | 95
BYU | 90*

Semifinals
UCLA | 90
Weber State | 58
San Francisco | 55
Long Beach State | 75

Finals
UCLA | 73
Long Beach State | 57
West Regional third place
Weber State | 64
San Francisco | 74

=== Final Four ===
National semifinals Thursday, March 23
E | North Carolina | 75
ME | Florida State | 79
MW | Louisville | 77
W | UCLA | 96

National Championship Game; Saturday, March 25
ME | Florida State | 76
W | UCLA | 81
National third-place game
E | North Carolina | 105
MW | Louisville | 91

== Announcers ==
Curt Gowdy, Tom Hawkins, and Jim Simpson (Final Four only) - First Round at Pocatello, Idaho (Long Beach State-BYU); East Regional Final at Morgantown, West Virginia; Final Four at Los Angeles, California

- Jim Simpson and Bill Enis - First Round at Knoxville, Tennessee (Marquette-Ohio)
- Jay Randolph and Pat Hernon - Mideast Regional Final at Dayton, Ohio
- Bill Enis and Frank Dill - Midwest Regional Final at Ames, Iowa
- Charlie Jones and Elgin Baylor - West Regional Final at Provo, Utah

== See also ==
- 1972 NCAA College Division basketball tournament
- 1972 National Invitation Tournament
- 1972 NAIA Division I men's basketball tournament
- 1972 National Women's Invitation Tournament
