= 1971–72 Louisville Cardinals men's basketball team =

American college basketball season

1971–72 Louisville Cardinals men's basketball

NCAA Midwest Regional Champions Missouri Valley Conference Champions

NCAA Men's Division I Tournament, Final Four
- Conference: Missouri Valley Conference

Ranking
- Coaches: No. 4
- AP: No. 4
- Record: 26-5 (12-2 Missouri Valley Conference)
- Head coach: Denny Crum (1st season)
- Home arena: Freedom Hall

The 1971–72 Louisville Cardinals men's basketball team represented the University of Louisville during the 1971–72 NCAA Division I men's basketball season, Louisville's 59th season of intercollegiate competition. The Cardinals competed in the Missouri Valley Conference and were coached by Denny Crum, in his first season as a coach. The team played their home games at Freedom Hall.

Louisville defeated Memphis State 83–72 in the Missouri Valley Conference playoff to earn an automatic bid to the NCAA tournament. They beat Kansas State to win the NCAA tournament Midwest Regional and advance to the Final Four (their 2nd) where they fell to eventual champion UCLA, 96–77. They finished fourth, falling to North Carolina in the third-place game 105–91. The Cardinals finished with a 26–5 (12–2) record.
