= 1971–72 Kentucky Wildcats men's basketball team =

1971–72 season of University of Kentucky men's basketball team

1971–72 Kentucky Wildcats men's basketball

SEC regular season champions

NCAA Tournament, Regional Finals
- Conference: Southeastern Conference

Ranking
- Coaches: No. 14
- AP: No. 18
- Record: 21–7 (14–4 SEC)
- Head coach: Adolph Rupp (41st season)
- Assistant coaches: Joe B. Hall; Gale Catlett; Dick Parsons
- Home arena: Memorial Coliseum

The 1971–72 Kentucky Wildcats men's basketball team represented the University of Kentucky in the 1971–72 college basketball season. The team's head coach was Adolph Rupp who was in his last year in coaching due to the enforced retirement age for University of Kentucky employees. They played their home games at Memorial Coliseum and were members of the Southeastern Conference.
