= 1971–72 Illinois State Redbirds men's basketball team =

American college basketball season

1971–72 Illinois State Redbirds men's basketball

Dominican Holiday Tournament champion
- Conference: Conference of Midwestern Universities
- Record: 16–10 (6–2 CMU)
- Head coach: Will Robinson (2nd season)
- Assistant coaches: Warren Crews; John Parker; Gene Smithson
- Home arena: Horton Field House

The 1971–72 Illinois State Redbirds men's basketball team represented Illinois State University during the 1971–72 NCAA University Division men's basketball season. The Redbirds, led by second-year head coach Will Robinsion, played their home games at Horton Field House in Normal, Illinois as members of the Conference of Midwestern Universities. They finished the season 16–10, 6–2 in conference play to finish in second place.

== Roster ==
1971–72 Illinois State Redbirds men's basketball team
Players
Coaches

Pos.	#	Name	Height	Weight	Year	Hometown
F	45	Myron Litwiller	6 ft 6 in (1.98 m)	—	Sr	Armington, IL
	51	Dennis Murray	6 ft 5 in (1.96 m)	—	Sr	Detroit, MI
F	30	Jim Smith (C)	6 ft 6 in (1.98 m)	—	Sr	Mount Vernon, IL
	55	Carlos Thomas	6 ft 5 in (1.96 m)	—	Sr	Chicago, IL
G	20	Doug Collins	6 ft 6 in (1.98 m)	—	Jr	Benton, IL
	41	Fred Points	6 ft 3 in (1.91 m)	—	Jr	Columbus, OH
	5	Tom Prombo	6 ft 2 in (1.88 m)	—	Jr	Chicago Heights, IL
G	13	Dan Witt	5 ft 11 in (1.8 m)	—	Jr	Maple Park, IL
G		Kent Arends	6 ft 6 in (1.98 m)	—	So	Melvin, IL
C	43	Stepney Bacon	6 ft 9 in (2.06 m)	—	So	Detroit, MI
C	24	Ron deVries	6 ft 11 in (2.11 m)	—	So	Detroit, MI
	54	Ron Eeten	6 ft 6 in (1.98 m)	—	So	San Jose, IL
F	25	Duane Fox	6 ft 7 in (2.01 m)	—	So	Inkster, MI
	31	Mack Rush	6 ft 6 in (1.98 m)	—	So	St. Louis, MO
F	53	Clarence Weaver	6 ft 8 in (2.03 m)	—	So	St. Louis, MO

Head coach

- Will Robinson (West Virginia State)

Assistant coach(es)

- Warren Crews (Southeast Missouri State)
- John Parker (Detroit Mercy)
- Gene Smithson (North Central (IL))

Legend

- (C) Team captain
- (S) Suspended
- (I) Ineligible
- (W) Walk-on
- Injured
- Current redshirt

Roster
Last update: January 17, 2021

== Schedule ==
Date time, TV	Rank^{#}	Opponent^{#}	Result	Record	High points	High rebounds	High assists	Site (attendance) city, state
Regular season
December 1, 1971*		Oral Roberts	L 93–95	0–1	40 – Collins	9 – Bacon	–	Horton Field House; Normal, IL
December 3, 1971*		vs. Western Illinois; Chip Cage Classic [Semifinal]	W 70–50	1–1	–	–	–	Ronald W Finch Fieldhouse; Mount Pleasant, MI
December 4, 1971*		vs. Eastern Illinois; Chip Cage Classic [Final]	L 73–77	1–2	–	–	–	Ronald W Finch Fieldhouse; Mount Pleasant, MI
December 6, 1971*		Southwest Missouri State	W 99–70	2–2	28 – Collins	13 – Bacon	–	Horton Field House; Normal, IL
December 8, 1971*		Southeast Missouri State	W 99–72	3–2	34 – Collins	–	–	Horton Field House; Normal, IL
December 11, 1971*		at Murray State	L 74–85	3–3	29 – Collins	10 – deVries	–	Racer Arena; Murray, KY
December 14, 1971*		at Iowa State	L 85–106	3–4	–	–	–	James H Hilton Coliseum; Ames, IA
December 15, 1971*		at Northeast Missouri State	W 86–75	4–4	–	–	–	John J Pershing Arena; Kirksville, MO
December 18, 1971*		at Buffalo	L 74–80	4–5	28 – Collins	8 – Collins	–	Clark Hall; Buffalo, NY
December 29, 1971*		vs. DePauw; Dominican Holiday Tournament [Semifinal]	W 118–90	5–5	42 – Collins	–	–	Theatre/Gymnasium Complex; Racine, WI
December 30, 1971*		vs. Buffalo State; Dominican Holiday Tournament [Final]	W 78–73	6–5	26 – Smith	–	–	Theatre/Gymnasium Complex; Racine, WI
January 5, 1971*		MacMurray	W 116–73	7–5	31 – Collins	14 – deVries	–	Horton Field House; Normal, IL
January 8, 1972		Indiana State	L 66–69	7–6 (0–1)	36 – Collins	10 – deVries, Weaver	–	Horton Field House; Normal, IL
January 10, 1972*		at Morehead State	L 94–104	7–7	36 – Collins	13 – deVries	–	Wetherby Gymnasium; Morehead, KY
January 15, 1972; 7:30 pm		Ball State	W 99–92	8–7 (1–1)	55 – Collins	–	–	Horton Field House; Normal, IL
January 18, 1972*		Winona State	W 107–91	9–7	45 – Collins	–	–	Horton Field House; Normal, IL
January 29, 1972		at Indiana State	W 91–76	10–7 (2–1)	–	–	–	Indiana State College Arena; Terre Haute, IN
February 1, 1972*		at Pacific	L 94–107	10–8	42 – Collins	13 – deVries	–	Pacific Pavilion; Stockton, CA
February 4, 1972*		at No. 5 California State–Long Beach	L 63–88	10–9	26 – Collins	11 – Bacon	–	University Gym; Long Beach, CA
February 9, 1972		Northern Illinois	L 85–99	10–10 (2–2)	28 – Collins	20 – deVries	–	Horton Field House (8,500); Normal, IL
February 12, 1972; 7:35 pm		at Southern Illinois	W 90–83	11–10 (3–2)	30 – Collins	15 – deVries	–	SIU Arena; Carbondale, IL
February 16, 1972		at Ball State	W 98–71	12–10 (4–2)	39 – Collins	–	–	Irving Gymnasium; Muncie, IN
February 19, 1972*		Central Michigan	W 75–60	13–10	26 – Collins	12 – deVries	–	Horton Field House; Normal, IL
February 23, 1972		at Northern Illinois	W 86–85	14–10 (5–2)	–	–	–	Chick Evans Field House (4,422); DeKalb, IL
February 26, 1972*		at Central Missouri State	W 92–75	15–10	32 – Collins	12 – Bacon	–	Garrison Gym; Warrensburg, MO
February 29, 1972*		Athletes In Action; Exhibition	W 94–70		–	–	–	Horton Field House; Normal, IL
March 4, 1972; WRAU		Southern Illinois	W 88–84	16–10 (6–2)	36 – Collins	22 – deVries	–	Horton Field House; Normal, IL
*Non-conference game. ^{#}Rankings from AP Poll. (#) Tournament seedings in parentheses. All times are in Central Standard Time.
