= Bill Walton =

American basketball player and sportscaster (1952–2024)

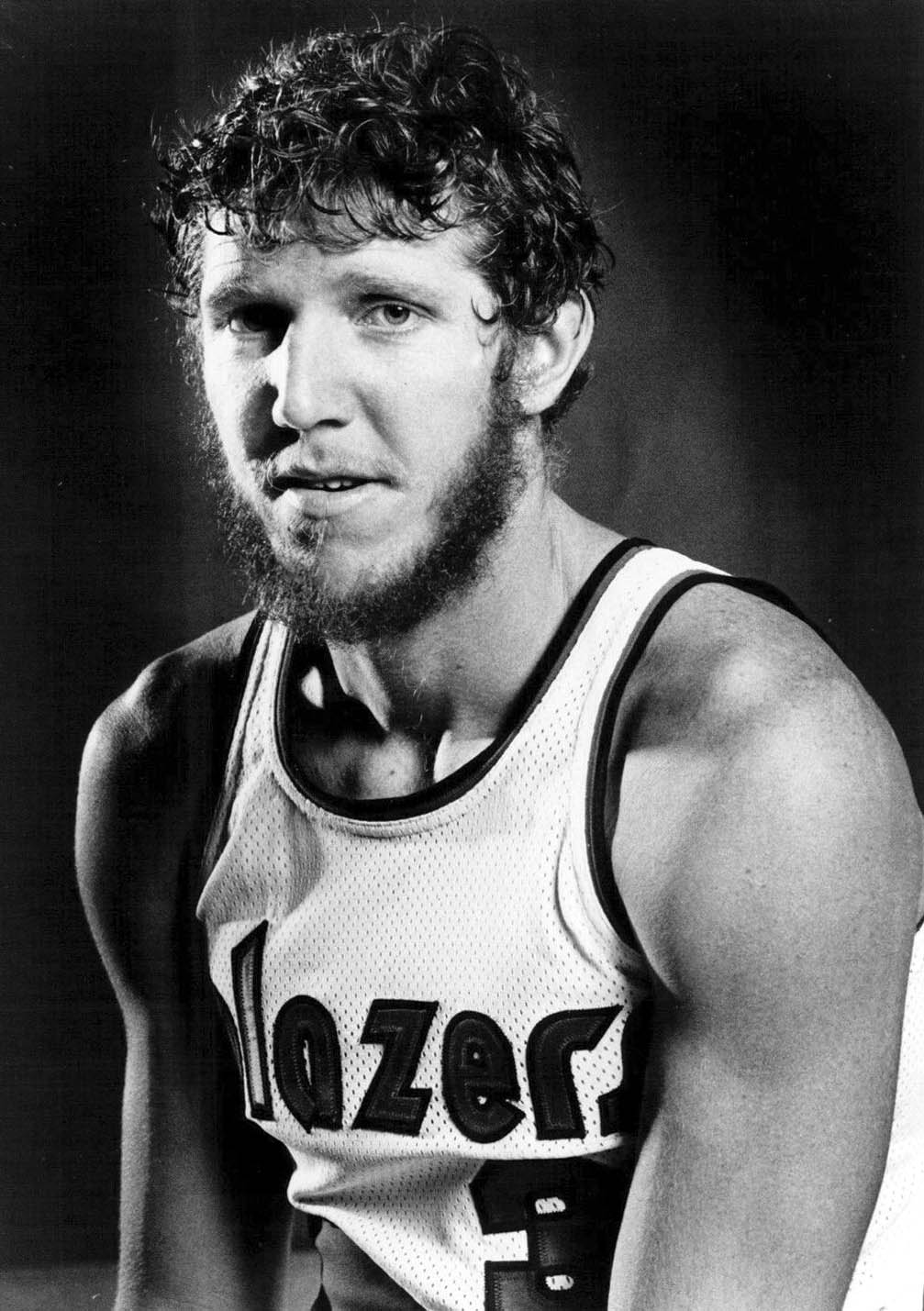
- Walton with the Portland Trail Blazers in 1977

Personal information
- Born: November 5, 1952 La Mesa, California, U.S.
- Died: May 27, 2024 (aged 71) San Diego, California, U.S.
- Listed height: 6 ft 11 in (2.11 m)
- Listed weight: 210 lb (95 kg)

Career information
- High school: Helix (La Mesa, California)
- College: UCLA (1971–1974)
- NBA draft: 1974: 1st round, 1st overall pick
- Drafted by: Portland Trail Blazers
- Playing career: 1974–1988
- Position: Center
- Number: 32, 5

Career history
- 1974–1979: Portland Trail Blazers
- 1979–1985: San Diego / Los Angeles Clippers
- 1985–1988: Boston Celtics

Career highlights
- 2× NBA champion (1977, 1986); NBA Finals MVP (1977); NBA Most Valuable Player (1978); 2× NBA All-Star (1977, 1978); All-NBA First Team (1978); All-NBA Second Team (1977); 2× NBA All-Defensive First Team (1977, 1978); NBA Sixth Man of the Year (1986); NBA rebounding leader (1977); NBA blocks leader (1977); No. 32 retired by Portland Trail Blazers; NBA anniversary team (50th, 75th); 2× NCAA champion (1972, 1973); 2× NCAA Final Four Most Outstanding Player (1972, 1973); 3× National college player of the year (1972–1974); 3× Consensus first-team All-American (1972–1974); James E. Sullivan Award (1973); 3× First-team All-Pac-8 (1972–1974); No. 32 retired by UCLA Bruins; First-team Parade All-American (1970); California Mr. Basketball (1970)

Career NBA statistics
- Points: 6,215 (13.3 ppg)
- Rebounds: 4,923 (10.5 rpg)
- Assists: 1,590 (3.4 apg)
- Stats at NBA.com
- Stats at Basketball Reference
- Basketball Hall of Fame
- Collegiate Basketball Hall of Fame

William Theodore Walton III (November 5, 1952 – May 27, 2024) was an American basketball player and television sportscaster. He played college basketball for the UCLA Bruins and professionally in the National Basketball Association (NBA) for the Portland Trail Blazers, San Diego / Los Angeles Clippers, and Boston Celtics. He is a member of the Naismith Memorial Basketball Hall of Fame and the National Collegiate Basketball Hall of Fame.

Walton rose to prominence in the early 1970s as UCLA's starting center for coach John Wooden. The 6-foot-11-inch (2.11 m) Walton won three consecutive national college player of the year awards (1972–1974), while leading UCLA to NCAA championships in 1972 and 1973 and an 88-game winning streak. After being selected as the first overall pick in the 1974 NBA draft, Walton led the Portland Trail Blazers to the team's first and only NBA championship in 1977, earning the NBA Finals Most Valuable Player Award. The following season, Walton was the 1978 NBA Most Valuable Player (MVP).

Walton's professional career, however, was significantly hampered by foot injuries, requiring numerous surgeries (Walton underwent 37 orthopedic surgeries in his lifetime). As a result, Walton only played in 468 out of 1,148 possible regular season games across his 14-year NBA career. After his MVP season, Walton sat out the 1978–79 season and was then signed by the Clippers, for whom he played four injury-plagued seasons. His career was rehabilitated during two seasons with the Celtics at the end of his career. Playing as a backup center behind Robert Parish, Walton earned the NBA Sixth Man of the Year Award in the 1985–86 season and contributed significantly to the Celtics' playoff run that year, culminating in his second NBA championship. He was named to the NBA's 50th and 75th anniversary teams.

After retiring from the NBA, Walton overcame stuttering and embarked on a second career as a sportscaster, working both as a studio analyst and color commentator with several networks and teams. He earned an Emmy Award in 2001.

== Early life ==
Walton was born and raised in La Mesa, California, a suburb of San Diego, the son of Gloria Anne (née Hickey) and William Theodore "Ted" Walton Jr. He was raised with siblings Bruce, Cathy, and Andy. The Walton home was on a hillside on Colorado Avenue, just below Lake Murray.

Walton's father was a music teacher and social worker, and his mother was a librarian. His parents had interests in art, literature, politics, and music. Walton took music lessons, and although his parents were not sports-oriented, Walton followed in the footsteps of his older brother Bruce, who had gravitated toward sports. When the Walton children were in junior high and high school, their father formed an informal family band: Bruce played trombone, Bill played baritone horn, Andy played the saxophone, and Cathy played drums (or flute or tuba).

Walton first played organized basketball under Frank "Rocky" Graciano, who coached at Walton's Catholic elementary school. Walton said that Graciano "made it [basketball] fun and really emphasized the joy of playing the team game. I was a skinny, scrawny guy. I stuttered horrendously, couldn't speak at all. I was a very shy, reserved player and a very shy, reserved person. I found a safe place in life in basketball."

== High school career ==
Walton played high school basketball at Helix High School in La Mesa alongside his older brother Bruce, who was also a star on the school's football team and would later go on to play for the Dallas Cowboys. During games with the two Waltons on the court, any tough physical treatment laid out on the younger Bill would be matched back by the 6 ft 6 in (1.98 m), 300 pounds (136 kg) Bruce in turn.

"When those opposing teams would try to get physical with me, Bruce would do whatever it took to protect me," Walton recalled. "He went on to play for the Dallas Cowboys. Bruce and I are the only brother combination in history to ever play in the Super Bowl and to win the NBA championship."

"When they would begin to rough up Bill, I would look at coach and he would give me a nod." recalled Bruce. "Yes," said Gloria Walton, "then when the referee wasn't looking, Bruce would give the player an elbow and let him know that the skinny guy was his kid brother."

Walton's struggle with injury and pain began while at Helix, where he broke an ankle, a leg, several bones in his feet, and underwent knee surgery. Before his sophomore season, Walton underwent surgery to repair torn cartilage on his left knee. Because of his recovery from the knee surgery, Walton played most of his sophomore year on the junior varsity team. Coach Gordon Nash promoted him to the varsity team the end of the season. But, he played in only six games and did not start any of them.

Between his sophomore and junior years of high school (age 15–16), Walton grew from 6 ft 1 in (1.85 m) to 6 ft 7 in (2.01 m). Coach Nash played Bill and Bruce Walton together in the paint. Bill was taller, but frail as he had not filled out his growing frame. Bill was unable to play a complete game without resting. "He would simply get too tired", recalled Nash. "When that happened, he'd tell me and I'd take him out."

While Walton was in high school in 1967, the NBA expansion San Diego Rockets came to town. The Rockets had no set practice facility and would often play pick-up games at Helix High School. Rocket players learned that to get into the Helix gym they could call the teenage Walton, who had his own gym key. Walton recalled Elvin Hayes calling and telling his mother, "Tell Billy, Big E is calling and we need him to open the gym tonight. I said, 'Mom, that's Big E! Give me the phone!' I was never so embarrassed in my life. Elvin and I are still close friends. All of those guys, all still my friends to this very day."

"We had the best gym in San Diego and all the Rockets players wanted to go there," Walton reflected. "They had some great teams with Elvin Hayes and Calvin Murphy and future head coaches and broadcasters such as Pat Riley, Rick Adelman, Rudy Tomjanovich, Jim Barnett, and Stu Lantz. All these guys treated me—little Billy—like I was part of the team. They couldn't have been nicer, and I became their friend."

=== Championships and national records ===
Walton overcame all obstacles and led Helix to 49 consecutive victories in his two varsity seasons. Helix won the California Interscholastic Federation (CIF) Championship in both 1969 and 1970, finishing 29–2 in 1968–69 and 33–0 in 1969–70. He graduated at about 6 ft 11 in (2.11 m) tall. Walton averaged 29 points and 25 rebounds, as Helix finished 33–0 in his senior season.

As a senior in 1969–70, Walton made 384 of 490 shot attempts, 78.3 percent, still the all-time national record. In addition, Walton's 825 rebounds that season ranks No 3 all-time. His 25.0 rebounds per game in a season ranks No. 8 all-time.

In 1970, Walton was featured in "Faces in the Crowd" in the January 26 issue of Sports Illustrated, his first national media recognition.

"It was a dream come true to be a part of a special team," Walton said. "Helix is where it all began. It was a humbling honor and privilege to be on the same squad as true legends Monroe Nash, Wilbur Strong, Phil Edwards, and Bruce Menser. I'm the luckiest guy on earth."

Hall of Fame Coach Denny Crum, then an assistant coach at University of California, Los Angeles (UCLA) under John Wooden, was sent to watch Walton play. Crum first saw Walton in 1968 as a high school junior and was at first dubious when hearing of Walton, but went to scout him anyway. "I came back and told Coach Wooden that this Walton kid was the best high school player I'd ever seen," Crum recalled.

== College career ==
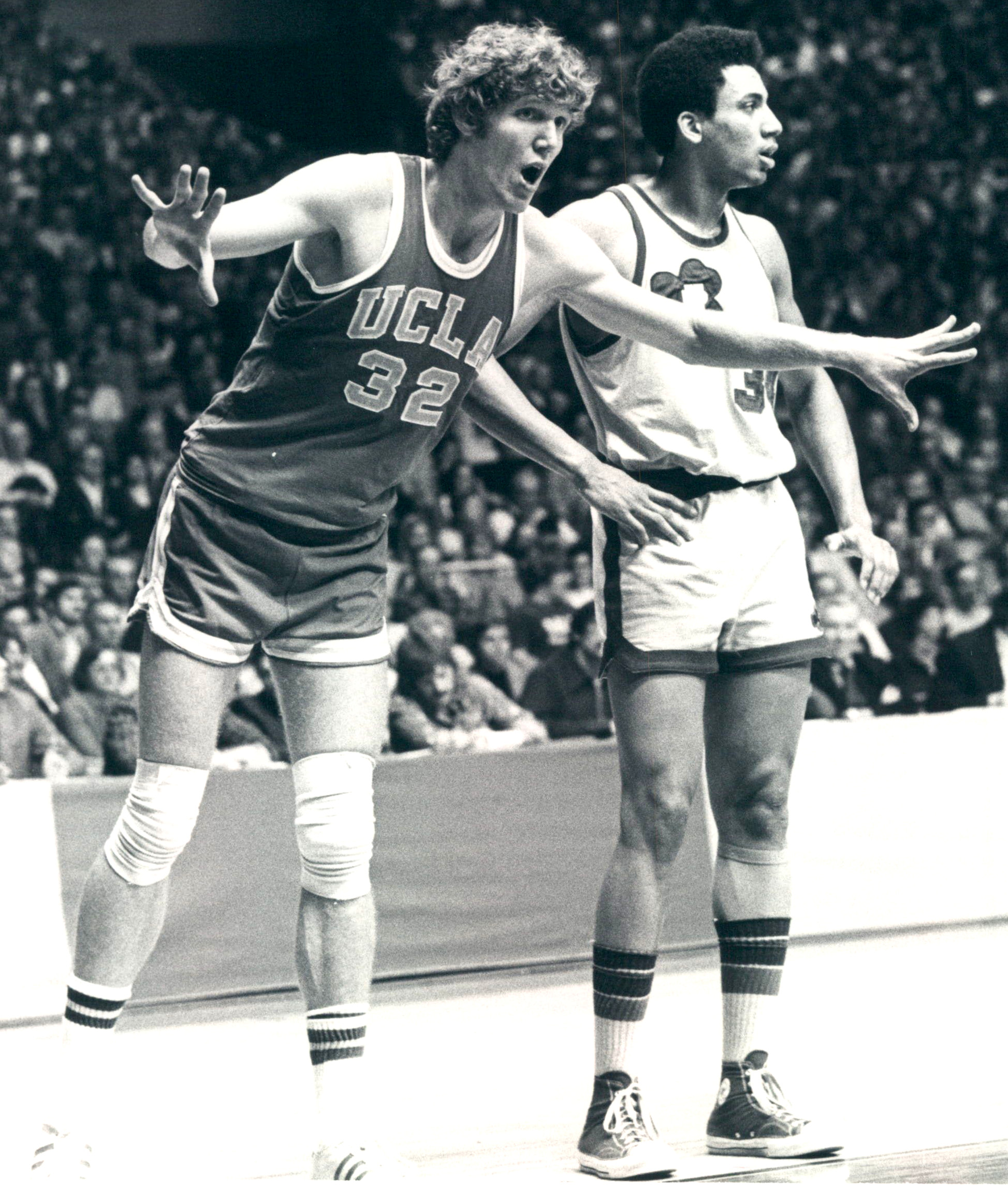
Bill Walton playing for UCLA

Beginning in elementary and high school, Walton had loyally followed UCLA's basketball team on the radio. He was recruited by many colleges, but quickly accepted UCLA's scholarship offer to play basketball for the Bruins and Coach Wooden. Wooden became a lifetime mentor to Walton.

Said Walton of Coach Wooden: "I was John Wooden's easiest recruit. I became his worst nightmare. I drove the poor guy to an early grave when he was 99. I had three different periods of my life in my relationship with him: (1) when I was a high school student and he was recruiting me; (2) when I played for him when I was 17 to 21; (3) and then 36 years of being his friend. I had no idea what we had at UCLA. I thought everybody had the same thing: great parents, great schools, great neighborhoods, great colleges, great coaches. Then I joined the NBA. And I realized immediately that I had just absolutely blown this whole deal with John Wooden. And so I spent the rest of my life, first of all, trying to make it up to him; and second of all, no longer [bringing] consternation into his life."

Walton played for UCLA under Coach Wooden from 1971 to 1974. His older brother Bruce played football at UCLA, enrolling a year ahead of Bill. Bill Walton led the Bruins to two consecutive 30–0 seasons and the NCAA men's basketball record 88-game winning streak. The UCLA streak contributed to a personal winning streak of 142 games that lasted almost five years, in which Walton's high school, UCLA freshman (freshmen were ineligible for the varsity at that time) and UCLA varsity teams did not lose a game from the middle of his junior year of high school to the middle of his senior year in college.

=== Freshman season (1970–1971) ===
Walton (18.1 ppg, 68.6% field goal accuracy), along with Greg Lee (17.9 ppg) and Keith Wilkes (20.0 ppg), was a member of the 20–0 1970–71 UCLA freshman team.

The varsity UCLA team, led by seniors Sidney Wicks, Curtis Rowe, and Steve Patterson defeated Villanova in the 1971 NCAA Championship Game for UCLA's fifth consecutive NCAA title.

After Walton initially refused to cut his hair as an incoming freshman, Coach Wooden told Walton "we'll miss you." Walton then rode his bike to a nearby barber.

=== Sophomore season (1971–1972) ===
The 1971–72 UCLA basketball team had a record of 30–0, winning its games by an average margin of more than 30 points, averaging 94.6 points to opponents' 64.3. With Walton playing alongside Henry Bibby, Larry Farmer, Wilkes, Lee, and Swen Nater, UCLA finished 14–0 in the Pac 8 Conference.

In the 25-team 1972 NCAA tournament, UCLA defeated Weber State 90–58. They defeated Long Beach State and coach Jerry Tarkanian in the Western Regional final 73–57 to reach the Final Four. Playing 20 minutes due to foul trouble, Walton had four points and 12 rebounds in the victory over Weber State, taking only one shot. He had 19 points and 11 rebounds against Long Beach State.

In the 1972 Final Four, Walton had 33 points and 21 rebounds, on 11 of 13 shooting and 11 of 12 free-throws, against Louisville in the NCAA semifinal, as UCLA won 96–77. In the NCAA championship game, he had 24 points and 20 rebounds in the Bruins' 81–76 victory over Florida State. Walton was named the 1972 NCAA basketball tournament Most Outstanding Player.

Overall, in 30 games in 1971–72, Walton averaged 21.1 points and 15.5 rebounds, shooting 64.0% from the field. He was named first-team All-American with Jim Chones of Marquette, Bo Lamar of the Louisiana-Lafayette, Ed Ratleff of Long Beach State, and Tom Riker of South Carolina.

=== Junior season (1972–1973) ===
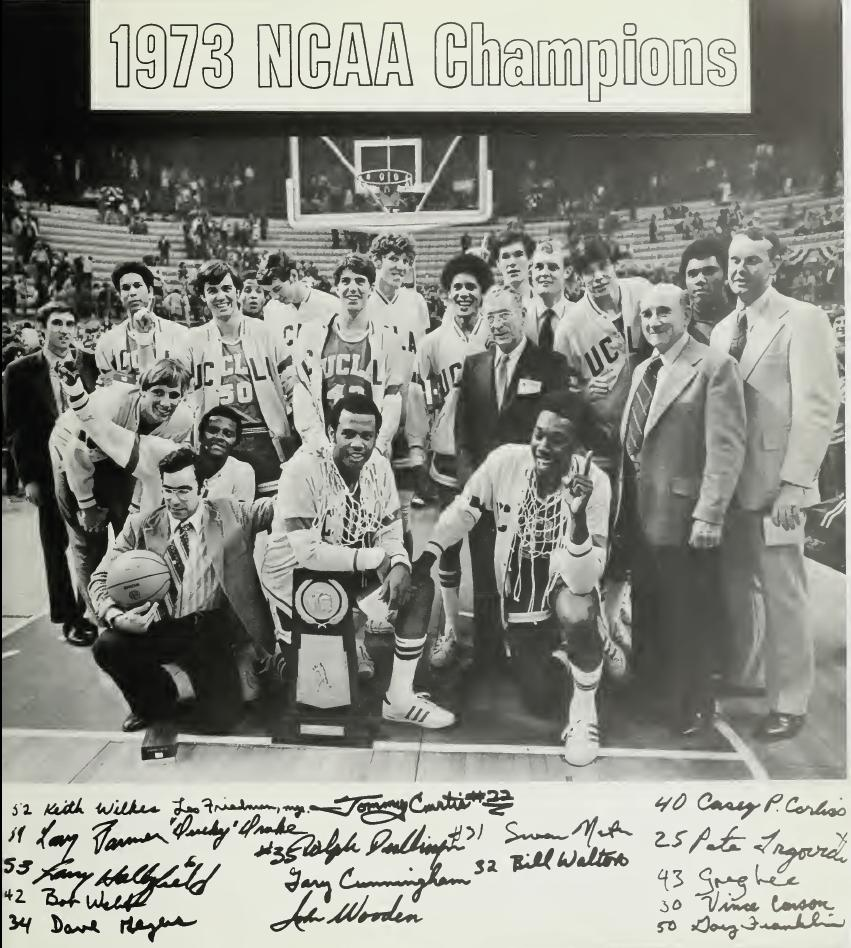
1973 UCLA yearbook, Southern Campus. 1973 UCLA basketball NCAA champions, Walton in back middle.

UCLA again finished 30–0 overall and 14–0 in the Pac-8 conference in 1972–73, winning its games by an average margin of more than 20 points, averaging 81.3 points to their opponents' 60.1.

In the 25-team 1973 NCAA tournament, UCLA defeated Arizona State 98–81 and then San Francisco in the West Regional Final 54–39 to reach the Final Four. Walton had 28 points and 14 rebounds against Arizona State, on 13 of 18 shooting, and 9 points and 14 rebounds against San Francisco, taking only 7 shots.

In the 1973 Final Four, the Bruins won the national semifinal 70–59 over Indiana and Hall of Fame coach Bob Knight. Walton had 14 points, seven rebounds, and nine assists against Indiana.

In the 1973 NCAA title game against Memphis State, Walton had arguably the best individual performance in an NCAA championship game, which was the first held on Monday night. At the St. Louis Arena on March 26, Walton scored 44 points on near-perfect 21 of 22 shooting. He added 13 rebounds, two assists, and one block, to lead the Bruins to a seventh straight title, 87–66 over Memphis State; the Tigers were led by head coach Gene Bartow (who replaced Wooden at UCLA three years later), with players Larry Kenon and Larry Finch. Walton set the record for most points in an NCAA championship game, which still stands, and was the tournament's most outstanding player.

Walton was hurt and left the game for the final time, with UCLA leading 75–62 and just under three minutes remaining. Playing with four personal fouls, Walton fell hard to the floor on a play and injured his left knee and ankle. He then limped off the floor, receiving an ovation from the 19,301 fans.

"I don't think anything ever meant as much to me as playing UCLA and one of John Wooden's best teams for the national championship", Bartow said in 1993. "We were able to go right through the press." At halftime, the game was tied 39–39. Bartow added, "I felt very good at halftime, very good. But to win, we also felt we had to control Walton. We couldn't let him dominate the game. Obviously, we didn't do a good job of that. Bill Walton probably had one of the best games anybody ever had in the history of college basketball."

"Coach Wooden looked at me and said, 'Walton, I used to think you were a good player until you missed that one shot,'" Walton said.

Overall in 1972–73, Walton averaged 20.4 points and 16.9 rebounds in 30 games on 65.0% shooting, as UCLA again finished 30–0 (14–0 in the Pac-8 conference). Walton was a consensus All-American alongside Ernie DiGregorio of Providence, Ed Ratleff of Long Beach State, David Thompson of North Carolina State, and Kermit Washington of American.

Walton's political personality was alive in his collegiate years on the UCLA campus. "One of the saddest days for Coach Wooden was the day he came down and had to bail me out of jail after I got arrested in the anti-Vietnam (War) protest. He said, 'Bill, I know you feel very strongly about this, but I just don't think that you getting arrested and taking part in this demonstration is what it's all about,'" recalled Walton.

"I had no problem with him during the season," Wooden said of Walton's college days. "Off the floor I worried. I worried when he was thrown in jail with the group that took over the administration building, I worried when he stopped traffic on Wilshire Boulevard, and when he interrupted classes giving his views on the Vietnam War."

=== Senior season (1973–1974) ===
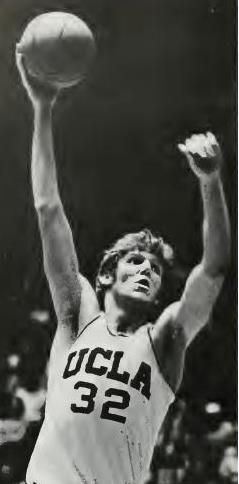
Walton during the 1974 season

In Walton's senior year, UCLA's 88-game winning streak ended with a 71–70 loss at Notre Dame on January 19, 1974. Walton played wearing a back brace, as he had suffered a major back injury in a fall against Washington State the week before. He was undercut by a Washington State player and broke two bones in his spine, which remained damaged until corrective surgery in 2009. He missed three games. But, he made 12 of his first 13 shots and the Bruins led Notre Dame by 17 points at halftime. UCLA was leading 70–59 with 3½ minutes remaining. However, they were outscored 12–0, missing six consecutive shots with four turnovers. As was his belief, Wooden did not call time-outs late in games and stuck with the strategy. The Irish made six shots in a row, winning on Dwight Clay's shot with 29 seconds left, as Notre Dame prevailed 71–70. Walton, who missed a 12-foot shot off an inbounds pass to win the game as time expired, finished with 24 points and nine rebounds. He said of his efforts that day, "A complete failure on all levels, particularly as a human being. A disgrace to the game of basketball, a disgrace to sport."

A week later, the Bruins beat the Fighting Irish 94–75 at home. Later in the season, UCLA dropped consecutive games in consecutive days at Oregon and Oregon State, nicknamed "the Lost Weekend". "There were so many problems", Walton said of the losses. "Injuries [he missed games with a bad back]. Team chemistry. It was just a nightmare."

UCLA finished 26–4 and 12–2 in the Pac 8 Conference, with Walton playing alongside Keith Wilkes, David Myers, and Marques Johnson.

In the 25 team 1974 NCAA tournament, UCLA defeated Dayton 111–100, in a game where Walton had 27 points and 19 rebounds. UCLA next defeated San Francisco 83–60 in the Western Regional Final to reach the Final Four. Walton tallied 17 points, nine rebounds, and four assists against San Francisco.

In the 1974 Final Four, UCLA's record seven consecutive national titles was broken. North Carolina State defeated the Bruins 80–77 in double overtime in the NCAA semi-finals. Walton played 50 minutes and scored 29 points, adding 18 rebounds and 4 assists in the loss. The UCLA–North Carolina State game was No. 13 on USA Today's list of the greatest NCAA tournament games of all time. Walton called the game the most disappointing outcome of his entire basketball career, as UCLA had a 5-point lead late in regulation and a 7-point lead in the 2nd overtime, before NC State with David Thompson rallied to win, 80–77.

"David Thompson's a great champion. He is a wonderful person and a very special human being", Walton said. "He was really fun to play against. He was a dynamic big moment guy, and I just wish I could have risen to the occasion."

"That failure has plagued me, and will, it is a stigma on my soul, and there's no way I can get rid of it." Walton said of the loss, "We could have, we should have won them all, and we didn't get it done. And when you're in that position, it's the worst feeling in the world. That's the timelessness of pain and suffering; the agonizing, the reflection and the endless questioning of yourself. When you're right there and it's there for you and the whole world is watching, and it's recorded as history that can never be changed, that is a terribly heavy burden."

UCLA had to come back and play in the NCAA 3rd place game, in which they eventually defeated Kansas. "I didn't want to play and I told Coach Wooden that. We had a bitter argument over that, and I lost that argument, too", said Walton, who took only three shots as UCLA had a 78–61 win. He played 20 minutes in his last game for UCLA and Coach Wooden. "Twenty minutes too much", he said.

Overall, as a senior, Walton averaged 19.3 points, 14.7 rebounds, and 5.5 assists. He was named 1st Team All-American alongside Marvin Barnes of Providence, John Shumate of Notre Dame, David Thompson of North Carolina State, and teammate Wilkes of UCLA.

=== College totals ===
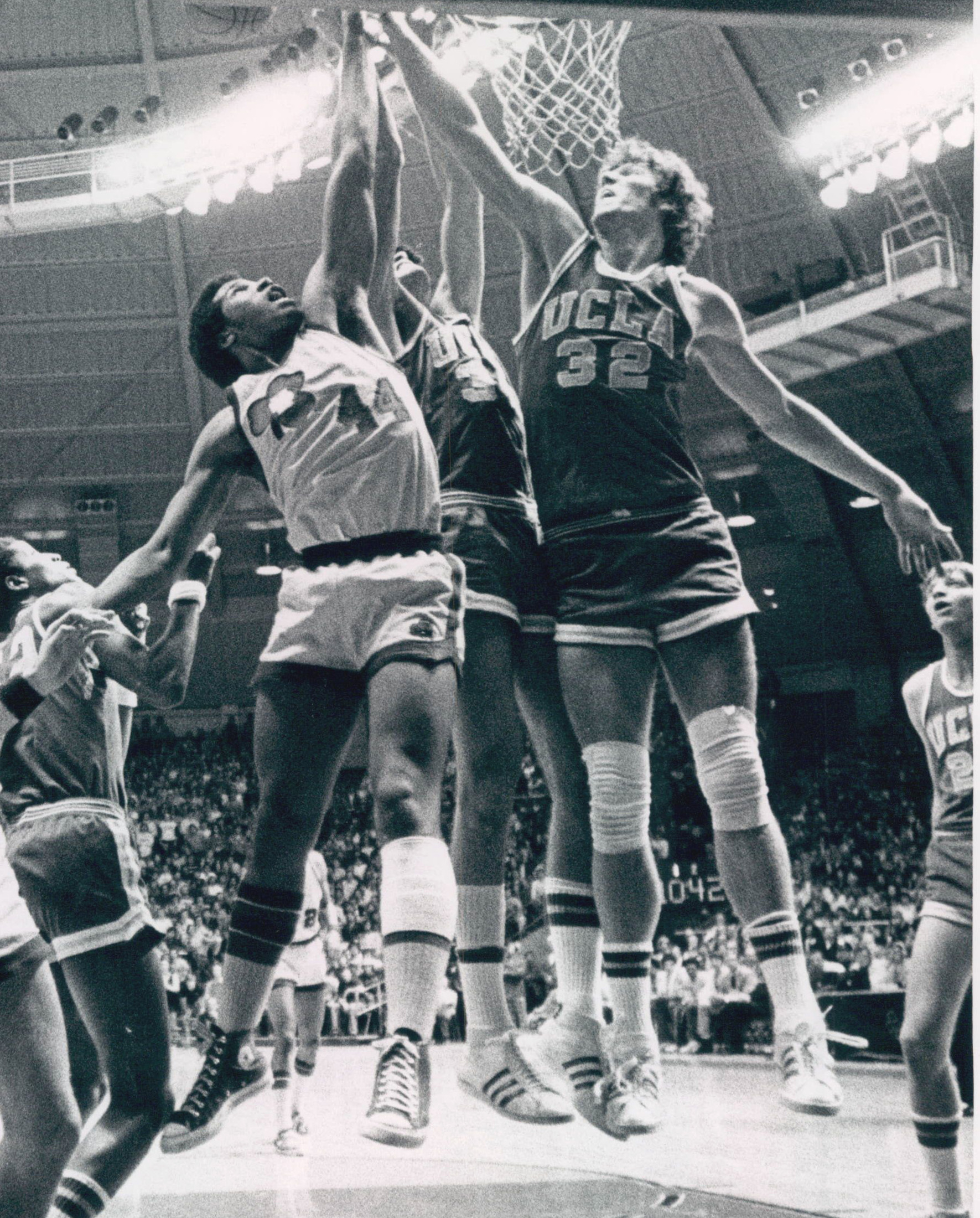
Bill Walton – UCLA, 1974

In his 87 career games at UCLA, Walton shot 65.1% from the field, averaging 20.3 points, 15.7 rebounds, and 5.5 assists. UCLA was 86–4 in Walton's three seasons.

Walton was the 1973 recipient of the James E. Sullivan Award as the top amateur athlete in the United States. Walton also received the USBWA College Player of the Year and Naismith College Player of the Year as the top college basketball player in 1972, 1973, and 1974. He earned Academic All-American honors in 1972, 1973 and 1974. Some college basketball historians rate Walton as the greatest who ever played at the college level.

Walton left UCLA to begin a new life in professional basketball and kept a lifetime friendship with Coach Wooden. "Coach Wooden never talked about winning and losing, but rather about the effort to win. He rarely talked about basketball, but generally about life. He never talked about strategy, statistics or plays, but rather about people and character. Coach Wooden never tired of telling us that once you become a good person, then you have a chance of becoming a good basketball player."

== Professional career ==
=== Portland Trail Blazers (1974–1979) ===
==== Injury-plagued early years (1974–1976) ====
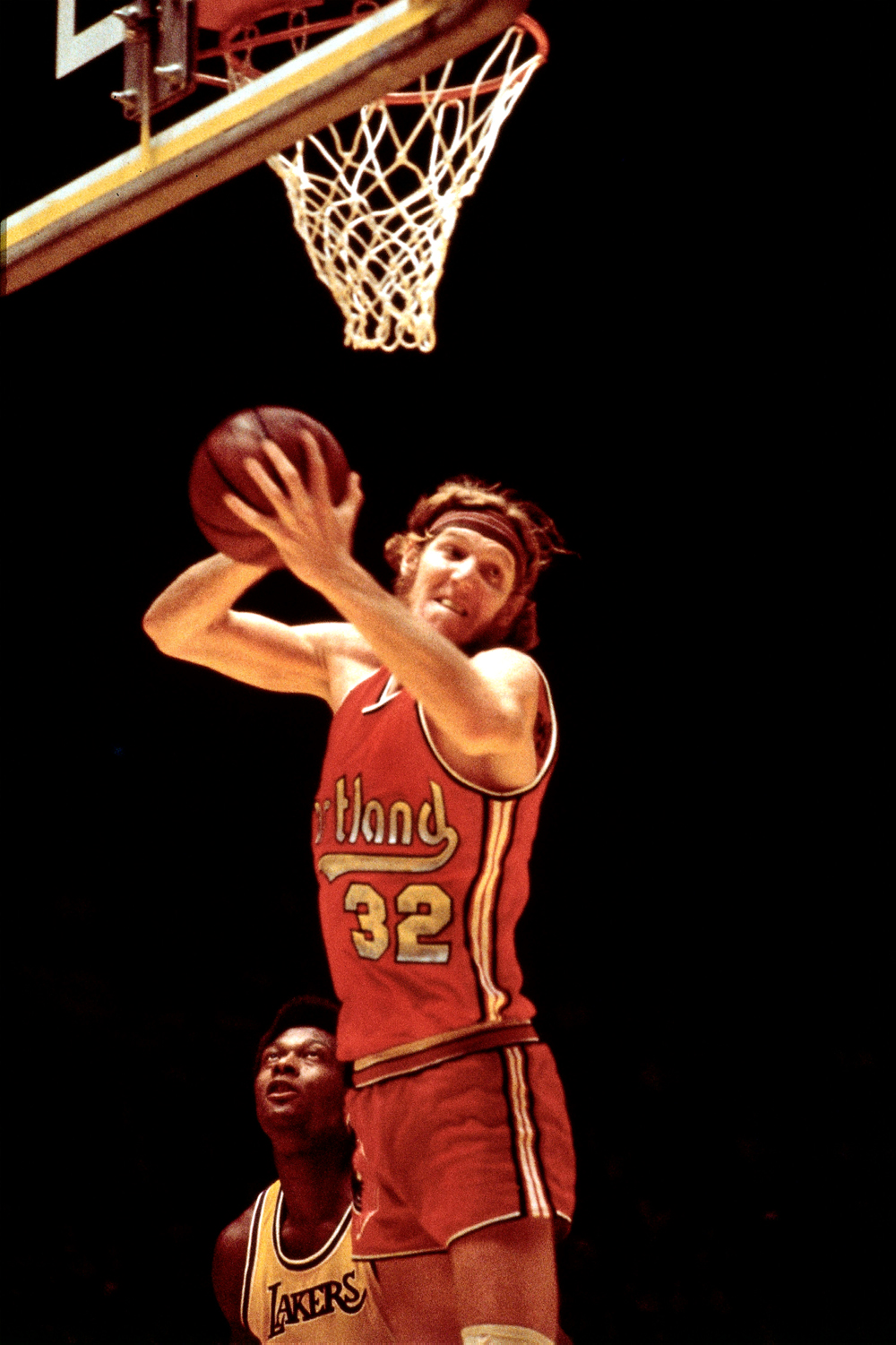
Walton in 1975

Walton was drafted by the American Basketball Association's Dallas Chaparrals in the 1973 ABA draft as an underclassman in an attempt to lure him from UCLA. In the locker room after the 1973 Championship game, Coach Wooden introduced Walton to representatives of the ABA, who hoped to convince him to turn pro. "Of which I had no interest in doing", Walton said.

In 1974, the ABA's San Diego Conquistadors tried to persuade Walton to sign with them, after drafting him in the 1974 ABA draft. San Diego had also signed Wilt Chamberlain as a player-coach as further incentive. Walton was not swayed.

Walton was the number one overall pick by the NBA's Portland Trail Blazers in the 1974 NBA draft. Walton signed with the Trail Blazers.

Walton's first two seasons in Portland were marred by chronic foot injuries. In addition, during his first two years, Walton badly sprained an ankle, broke his left wrist twice, dislocated two toes, dislocated two fingers, broke a toe and injured his leg in a jeep accident.

As a rookie in 1974–75, Walton averaged a double-double 12.8 points, 12.6 rebounds, 4.8 assists, and 2.7 blocks in 35 games. The Trail Blazers with Geoff Petrie, Sidney Wicks, and LaRue Martin finished 38–44 under player/coach Lenny Wilkens.

In 1975–76, Walton averaged 16.1 points, 13.4 rebounds, 4.3 assists, and 1.6 blocks in 51 games as Portland, with rookies Bob Gross and Lionel Hollins, finished 37–45.

==== First championship and Finals MVP (1976–1977) ====
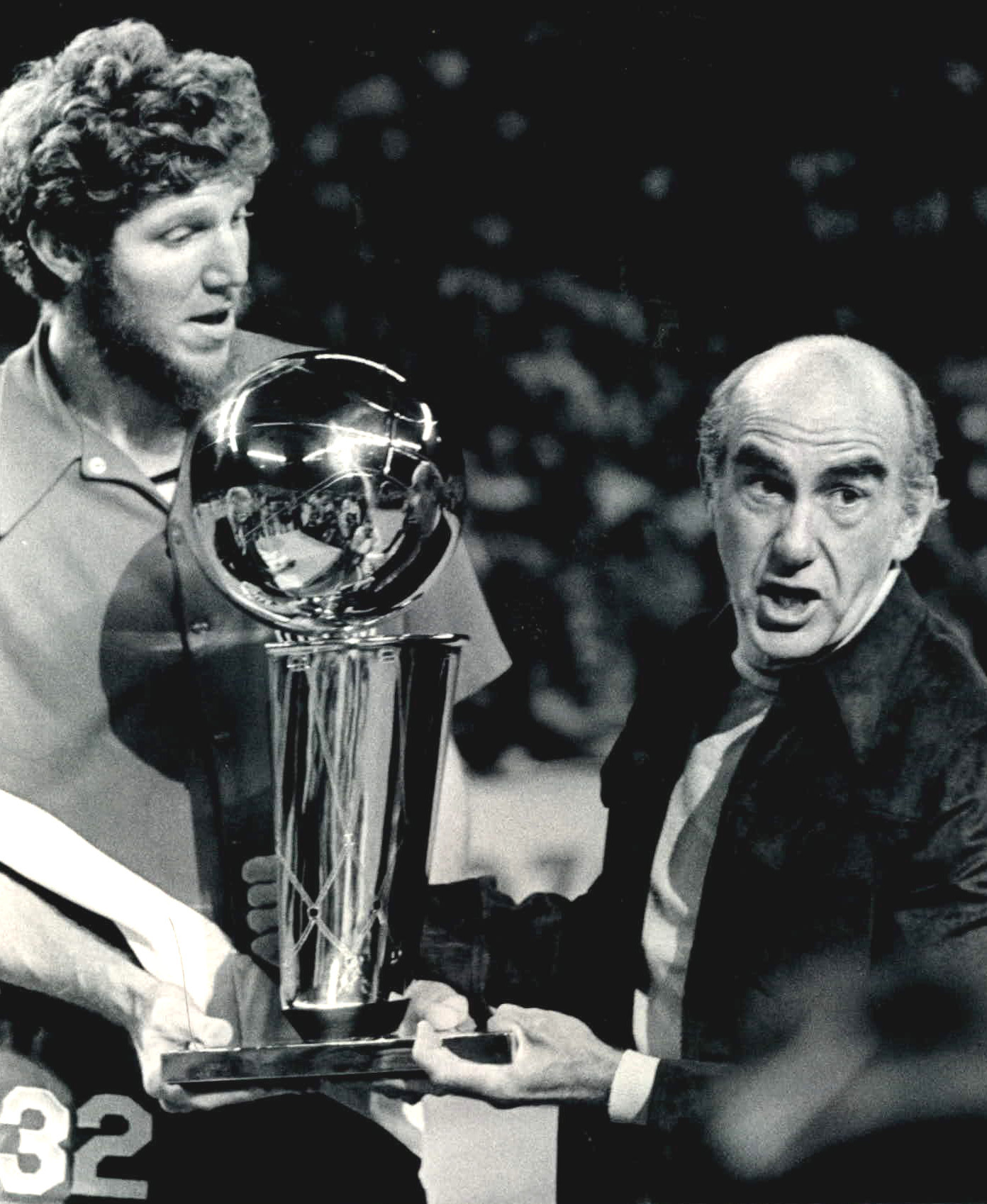
Walton and Portland coach Jack Ramsay holding the NBA championship trophy in 1977

In the 1976–77 season Walton played in 65 games and, spurred by new head coach Jack Ramsay, Walton and a newly acquired ABA draftee in Maurice Lucas, the Trail Blazers became the Cinderella team of the NBA. In a pre-season meeting with his new coach, Walton had advised Ramsay, "Coach, don't assume we know anything."

Walton led the NBA in both rebounds per game (14.4) and blocked shots per game (3.2) as he was selected to the NBA All-Star Game, but did not participate due to an injury. Walton was named to the NBA All-Defensive First Team and the All-NBA Second Team for his regular-season accomplishments. He averaged 18.6 points, 14.4 rebounds, 3.8 assists, and 3.2 blocks and Portland finished 49–33.

In the 1977 postseason, Walton led #3 seed Portland to series victories over the Chicago Bulls with Artis Gilmore (2–1) and the Denver Nuggets with Dan Issel (4–2). He averaged 17.3 points, 12.3 rebounds, 4.3 assists, and 4.3 blocks in the first round series against the Bulls. In the Nuggets series Walton averaged 17.5 points, 13.0 rebounds, 6.2 assists, and 3.0 blocks. In a 4–0 series sweep of the Los Angeles Lakers in the 1977 Western Conference finals, Walton averaged 19.3 points, 14.8 rebounds, 5.8 assists, and 2.3 blocks playing against fellow UCLA alum Kareem Abdul-Jabbar. That season, Abdul-Jabbar won the NBA's Most Valuable Player award; Walton finished second.

Portland matched up in the 1977 NBA Finals against the favored Philadelphia 76ers. After losing the first two games, the Blazers won four straight to win the NBA championship. Walton scored 20 points and grabbed 23 rebounds in the clinching Game 6 victory, and was named the Finals MVP with averages of 18.5 points, 19.0 rebounds, 5.2 assists, 1.0 steals, and 3.7 blocks, which prompted Philadelphia 76ers coach Gene Shue to comment after the series: "Bill Walton is the best player for a big man who ever played the game of basketball."

==== MVP campaign and holdout (1977–1979) ====
The following season, the 1977–78 Trail Blazers won 50 of their first 60 games, as Walton averaged 18.9 points, 13.2 rebounds, 5.0 assists, and 2.5 blocks in 58 games. Walton then suffered a broken foot, ending his regular season. During this time, he befriended the controversial writer Jack Scott, who wrote and published a book about him in 1978. Walton nonetheless won the 1978 NBA Most Valuable Player award and the Sporting News NBA MVP, as well. Walton played in his only NBA All-Star Game in 1978 and was named to both the NBA's First All-Defensive Team and the All-NBA First Team.

Portland finished the regular season 58–24, and Walton returned for the 1978 NBA playoffs. He was injured in the second game of their Western Conference Semifinal series against the Seattle SuperSonics, and was lost for the remainder of the playoffs. After having received a painkilling injection to play, X-rays taken after Game 2 revealed the navicular bone below Walton's left ankle was broken. Portland lost the series to Seattle in six games. Walton would never play for the Trail Blazers again.

During the off-season, Walton demanded to be traded, citing unethical and incompetent treatment of his and other players' injuries by the Blazers' front office. He did not get his wish and sat out the entire 1979 season in protest. Walton eventually signed with the San Diego Clippers when he became a free agent in 1979.

In five seasons with Portland, Walton played in 209 games, averaging a double-double of 17.1 points and 13.5 rebounds, with 4.4 assists and 2.6 blocks.

=== San Diego Clippers (1979–1985) ===
On May 13, 1979, Walton signed as a veteran free agent with the San Diego Clippers; the Portland Trail Blazers received Kevin Kunnert, Kermit Washington and a 1980 first-round draft pick (Mike Gminski was later selected) as compensation ordered by the NBA. Walton reportedly agreed to a seven-year, $7 million contract.

Due to injuries, Walton spent more time on the disabled list than on the court with his hometown team. In his first season with San Diego, Walton played 14 games for the Clippers in the 1979–80 season. Walton re-fractured the navicular bone in the fourth 1979 exhibition game and subsequently missed all of the 1980–81 and 1981–82 seasons, undergoing several surgeries on his injured foot. Walton ignored doctors who said he would never play again and underwent surgery to restructure his left foot in 1981. His high arch, which made the foot bones susceptible to breaking, was lowered to relieve the stress on the bones.

Following extensive rehabilitation, which included biking and sand volleyball, Walton's foot began to improve; after playing only 14 games from 1979 to 1982, he played 33 games in 1982–83 under doctor's orders to play about one game per week. He played in 55 games in 1983–84, and a then-career-high 67 in 1984–85, by which time the Clippers had relocated to Los Angeles.

"When you fail in your hometown, that's as bad as it gets, and I love my hometown", said Walton of his tenure in San Diego. "I wish we had NBA basketball here, and we don't because of me. It's my greatest failure as a professional in my entire life, I could not get the job done in my hometown. It is a stain and stigma on my soul that is indelible. I'll never be able to wash that off, and I carry it with me forever."

On Clippers owner Donald Sterling, Walton commented, "The checks bounced higher than the basketballs when Donald Sterling took over. The basketball was awful, and the business side was immoral, dishonest, corrupt, and illegal. Other than that, it was all fine."

In 169 games with the Clippers, Walton averaged 11.9 points, 9.0 rebounds, 2.9 assists, and 2.3 blocks, shooting 53.2%. The Clippers never finished near .500 or made the playoffs in his tenure with the franchise. As his feet became more durable, the Clippers had won 30 and 31 games in his final two seasons. At age 32, Walton wished to move to a winning franchise and reached out to teams after the season ended in 1985.

=== Boston Celtics (1985–1987) ===
==== Second championship and sixth man award (1985–1986) ====
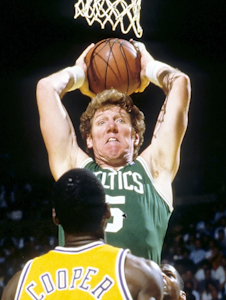
Michael Cooper watches as Walton grabs a rebound during the 1987 NBA Finals

After the 1984–85 campaign, Walton called on two of the league's premier teams, the Boston Celtics and the Los Angeles Lakers. After several players on the Celtics said they liked the idea of having Walton as a teammate backing up Robert Parish and Kevin McHale, Red Auerbach made the deal happen. One anecdote that particularly illustrates Walton's decision to choose the Celtics over the Lakers involves Larry Bird, who happened to be in Auerbach's office when Walton called. Bird said that if Walton felt healthy enough to play that it was good enough for him, as opposed to Lakers GM Jerry West, who was hedging his interest in Walton pending a doctor's report.

On September 6, 1985, Walton was traded by the Los Angeles Clippers to the Boston Celtics for Cedric Maxwell and a 1986 1st round draft pick (Arvydas Sabonis was later selected).

Walton described doctors looking at his X-rays at the hospital after he arrived in Boston:

And then Red, he bursts in through the double doors ... and he's smoking his cigar in the hospital, and he walks in and says, "Who are you guys and what are you doing with my player?" And they're saying, "Red, come here. Look at this. Look at his feet. Look at his face. We can't pass this guy." And Red says, "Shut up. I'm in charge here." And Red pushes his way through all the doctors, comes over. I'm lying on the table there in the doctors examining room. Red looks down at me. He says, "Walton, can you play?" I looked up at him with the sad, soft eyes of a young man who just wanted one more chance. One more chance to be part of something special, to be part of the team, to be with the guys one more time. And I looked up at him, and I said, "Red, I think I can. I think I can, Red." And Red, through the smoke, with a big, cherubic grin on his face, looked at the doctors, looked at me, and he said, "He's fine. He passes. Let's go. We've got a game." And we were able to go out and win a championship. I'm the luckiest guy in the world. Thank you Red Auerbach. Thank you Larry Bird. Thank you Boston Celtics. Thank you people of New England. Thank you Celtic nation. Wow. What a dream come true.

In his first time in a Celtics uniform in the Boston Garden, Walton received one-minute standing ovation from the Boston home crowd walking onto the court for his first exhibition game in 1985.

Walton played a career-high 80 games for Coach KC Jones and the Celtics during the 1985–86 season. Walton averaged 7.6 points, 6.8 rebounds, 2.3 assists, and 1.2 blocks in 19 minutes, and finished with a career-high 56.2 field goal percentage. Providing a reliable backup to Kevin McHale and Robert Parish, and playing alongside Larry Bird, Danny Ainge and Dennis Johnson, Walton received the 1986 NBA Sixth Man of the Year Award en route to the NBA championship. He became the only player to have won an NBA Finals MVP, Sixth Man Award, and regular season MVP.

The 1986 NBA playoffs were Walton's first taste of the postseason in nearly a decade, at age 33. Backing up McHale and Parish, he averaged 6.7 points, 9.3 rebounds, 1.7 assists, and 2.0 blocks in 19 minutes as the Celtics' had a 3–0 sweep in the Eastern Conference first round over the Chicago Bulls with Michael Jordan (43.7 point average in the series).

In the Celtics' 4–1 series win over the Atlanta Hawks with Dominique Wilkins in the Eastern Conference semi-finals, Walton averaged 8.0 points, 3.3 rebounds, and 1.3 assists in 13 minutes. In the Eastern Conference Finals 4–0 sweep against the Milwaukee Bucks, Walton averaged 8.8 points, 5.8 rebounds, and 2.0 assists in 18 minutes.

In the 1986 NBA Finals, the Celtics defeated the Houston Rockets with "Twin Towers" Hakeem Olajuwon and Ralph Sampson 4–2 to win the NBA Championship. Walton averaged 8.0 points, 6.7 rebounds, 1.0 assists, and 2.2 blocks in 19 minutes, in helping the Celtics win the championship.

"I knew we had something going when we got Walton", Larry Bird said on Walton and the 1985–86 Celtics. "It was all a matter of if he could stay healthy. We already had a pretty good team, and I think adding him and (Jerry) Sichting really helped us. Robert Parish accepting Bill Walton for who he is and what kind of player he was, I thought that was major. That's the best team I've ever been on, no question about that. I mean, we were good from top to bottom."

"It wasn't important to me because I had no say in the personnel decisions, but what I was impressed with was Bill Walton's character", Parish said of Walton joining the Celtics. "He thought enough of me to make sure I was comfortable with him being on the team. That's why I have the utmost respect for Bill Walton and that's the main reason why he was my inductee into the Hall of Fame. Bill Walton is my main man, for that reason."

==== Injury-plagued final playing year (1986–1987) ====
Walton was injured again in the 1986–87 regular season, but returned in time for the 1987 playoffs. He played in only ten games during the season.

Walton spent the 1987–88 season on the Celtics' injured list. He attempted a comeback in February 1990, but injuries intervened and he retired as a player.

Overall, Walton played 90 total games for the Celtics, shooting 55.1% and averaging 7.0 points, 6.4 rebounds, 1.9 assists and 1.3 blocks in 18 minutes.

== National team career ==
At age 17, just out of high school, in the summer of 1970, Walton was selected to represent the U.S. national basketball team at the 1970 FIBA World Championship. The team, under coach Hal Fisher, failed to win a medal in the tournament, coming in a disappointing fifth place. By far the youngest player on the roster and in the tournament, Walton played minimally in five games, averaging 2.6 points.

=== 1972 Olympics ===
Walton was selected to the 1972 U.S. Olympic basketball team, but declined to participate. Some saw it as a political statement given Walton's opposition to the Vietnam War, but the most likely reason for his decision was his bad experience at the 1970 World Championships. In a 2004 interview with ESPN, Walton stated that "for the first time in my life, I was exposed to negative coaching and the berating of players and the foul language and the threatening of people who didn't perform."

In the men's basketball final, the United States controversially lost to the Soviet Union 51–50, finishing in second place. According to Russian sports historian Robert Edelman, "when [the Russians] saw who was and wasn't on the U.S. team, that's when they started feeling like they'd actually have a chance. They followed American basketball closely and they knew that no Walton was going to be a big deal." The 1972 U.S. team's forward James Forbes told ESPN as part of a SportsCentury documentary, "If [Walton] plays, all of this becomes academic."

== Legacy ==
Coach Jack Ramsay, in 2010, called Walton the best Portland Trail Blazer, "hands down no question." "Walton could do everything, he had great timing, complete vision of the floor, had excellent fundamentals and was a great passer, both in outlet passes and in the half court. He loved playing basketball, just loved it, practices, games ... especially away games. He loved to win on the opponent's court. And he had a great head, a very dedicated team player." Of Walton's injuries, Ramsay added, "And that was very frustrating to both of us. To not be able to play was a crushing blow to him. And to me it was frustrating because I finally had a great team and a great player and it was all coming apart." Summarizing Walton's skill set, Ramsay has stated: “Bill Russell was a great shot blocker. Wilt Chamberlain was a great offensive player. But Walton can do it all.”

"I'm here to try and make amends for the mistakes and errors of the past", Walton, said to the press in returning to Portland in 2009. "I regret that I wasn't a better person. A better player. I regret that I got hurt. I regret the circumstances in which I left the Portland Trail Blazers family. I just wish I could do a lot of things over, but I can't. So I'm here to apologize, to try and make amends, and to try and start over and make it better."

Walton said, reflecting on his career: "I loved basketball. And I was going to go until I couldn't go anymore. I had no desire to ever stop playing. I've never met anybody who stopped playing voluntarily. I ground my body up. I've had 37 (38 now) orthopedic operations. I ground my feet up into dust. I've got a new knee. I've got a new spine. I'm the lucky one, in that I never thought going through all of it that I would be healthy at the end. And I almost wasn't. But I'm all better now."

"I would love to play one more game", Walton said. "But then I would want to play another one. And another one. But I will take one."

Overall, Walton played 468 games in his NBA career. He averaged a career double-double of 13.3 points, 10.5 rebounds, with 3.4 assists and 2.2 blocked shots, averaging 28 minutes. He shot 52.1% from the floor for his career. Walton's injuries and surgeries limited his career, and counting his 1978–1979 year-long holdout, Walton played in 44% of the regular season games in his 13-year career. His listed playing height was 6 ft 11 in (2.11 m); it has been reported that Walton was actually taller (7 ft 2 in (2.18 m) or more), but he does not like being categorized as a seven-footer.

In 2021, to commemorate the NBA's 75th Anniversary The Athletic ranked their top 75 players of all time, and named Walton as the 64th greatest player in NBA history. Encyclopædia Britannica considers him as "one of the best all-around players in the history of basketball".

== Media career ==
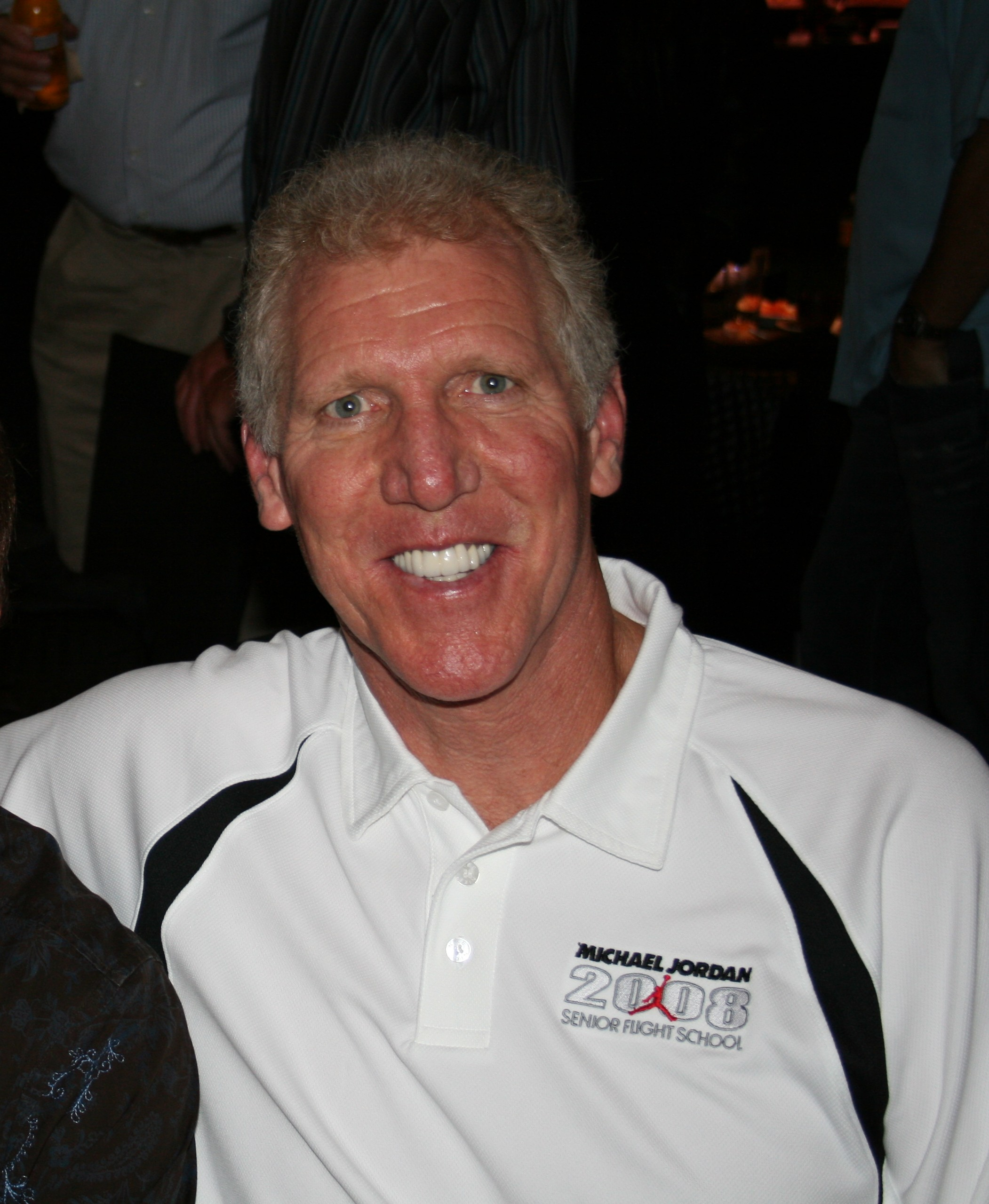
Walton overcame his stuttering and became a broadcaster.

Walton overcame a stuttering problem at age 28 with the help of legendary broadcaster Marty Glickman, after a lengthy conversation between the two at an event.

Walton said about his speech issues and subsequent career, "I'm a stutterer. I never spoke to anybody. I lived most of my life by myself. But as soon as I got on the court I was fine. But in life, being so self conscious, red hair, big nose, freckles and goofy, nerdy looking face and can't talk at all. I was incredibly shy and never said a word. Then, when I was 28 I learned how to speak. It's become my greatest accomplishment of my life and everybody else's biggest nightmare."

After his retirement as a player, Walton became a basketball color commentator. Walton worked for CBS's NBA coverage during the NBA Finals as well as college basketball coverage for the network during the NCAA Tournament in 1991 and 1992. He was then named as rotating analyst with Mike Fratello (who would leave in 1992, leaving Walton as the sole analyst) to work with Ralph Lawler on local Los Angeles Clippers telecasts for over a decade from 1990 to 2002. He also did work calling Dallas Mavericks games for a season in 1991–92 as well as calling UCLA college basketball games that same year. He then went to NBC in 1992 to start his most widely famous run as an analyst, covering not only the NBA from 1992 to the end of the network's coverage of the NBA in 2002, but also becoming the NBC's top college basketball analyst for its scarce college basketball coverage from 1993 to 1998, paired with mostly Don Criqui but sometimes also with Tom Hammond and Dick Enberg. After being loaned out by NBC to CBS to help with CBS's coverage of the 2001 NCAA Men's Basketball tournament, he would follow that up with a long run at ESPN and ABC as one of their lead in-game and studio analysts from 2002 to 2009. Walton was infamously on the call with Mike Breen for The Malice at the Palace, considered the worst brawl in NBA history, with even Walton, barely able to contain his disgust, calling it "a disgrace" on commentary.

After 19 years working in broadcasting, he left ESPN in November 2009, as the result of back problems, which dated back to an injury he suffered in college at UCLA. Following surgery on his back, Walton returned to broadcasting as a part-time commentator for the Sacramento Kings for 2010–11 and 2011–12. In July 2012, ESPN and the Pac-12 Network announced that Walton would return to full-time broadcasting as a game analyst for Pac-12 conference basketball coverage. Walton frequently worked alongside Dave Pasch while calling Pac-12 games. His commentary had been noted for his frequent use of catchphrases and hyperbole. This pairing lasted calling games until Walton's death. Walton also, for one last time, called a Los Angeles Clippers game with Ralph Lawler in celebration of Lawler's retirement from the industry. Walton typically was paired with Steve "Snapper" Jones for national NBA games because he and Jones had a point-counterpoint banter during games and a chemistry that earned them praise with critics.

Walton's 2003 TV series Bill Walton's Long Strange Trip aired on ESPN with Walton as subject and star.

While broadcasting a game between the Oregon Ducks and USC Trojans, Walton talked about a speech Bob Dylan gave at MusiCares, and ESPN had prepared graphics about Dylan's career highlights.

While broadcasting a Washington–Oregon January 2019 game with Dave Pasch, Walton mentioned he had appeared in the motion picture Ghostbusters. Ghostbusters was filmed in 1984 and Pasch questioned Walton about his claim throughout the game as to the specifics of his appearance and character, but Walton refused to provide more details. Research validated Walton's claim.

Walton hosted his own satellite radio show, One More Saturday Night (named after the Dead song of the same name), heard on Sirius Radio's Jam On and XM Radio's Grateful Dead channel.

In 2001, Walton received an Emmy Award for "Best Live Sports Television Broadcast". In 2018, he won the CoSIDA Dick Enberg Award.

== Personal life ==
=== Family ===
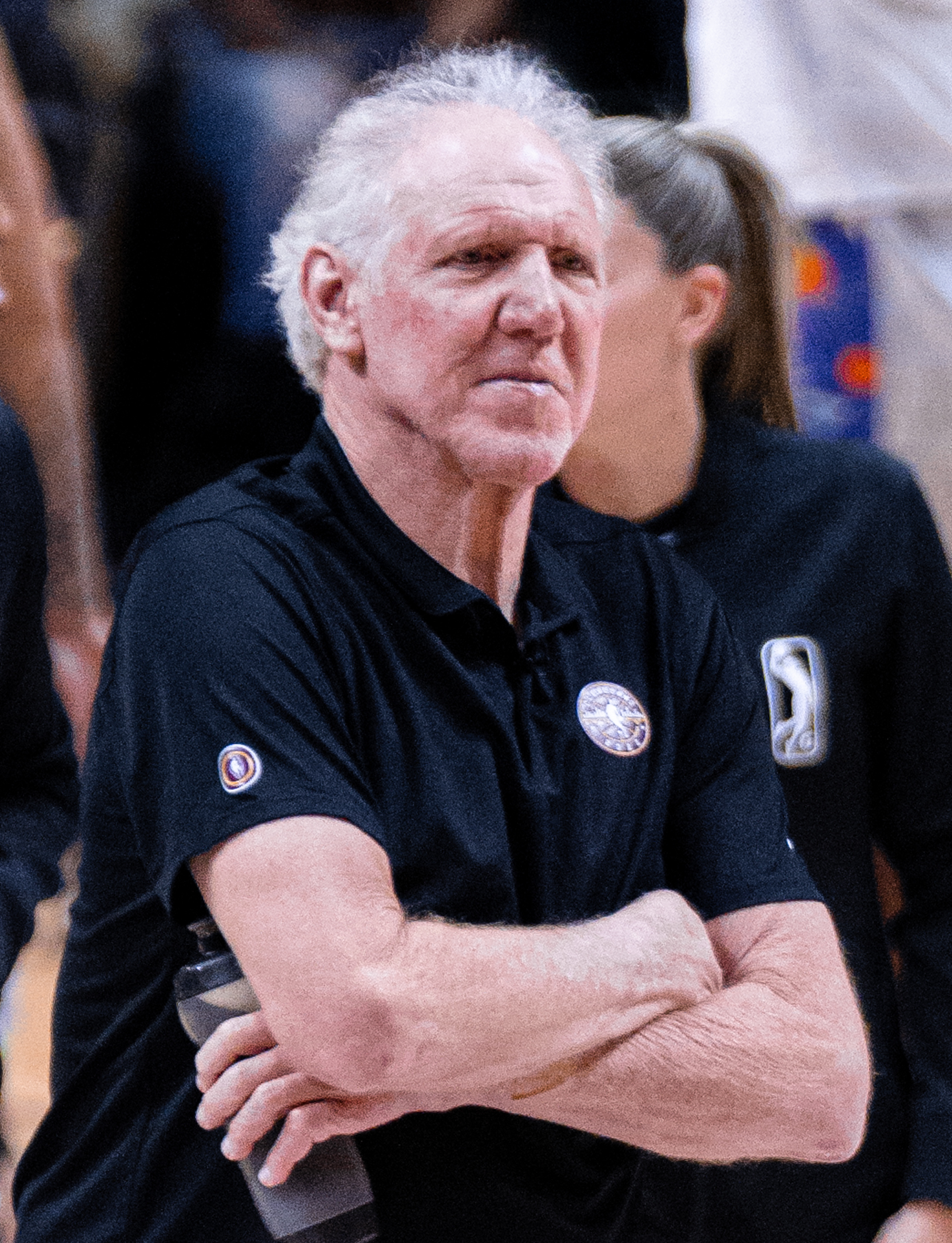
Walton at the 2022 NBA All-Star Game

Walton met his first wife, Susie, while they were attending UCLA and he was a sophomore. They were married in 1979 and divorced in 1989. They had four sons—Adam, Nathan, Luke, and Chris—who were all at least 6 feet 7 inches (2.01 m) tall and played basketball. At the time of his death, Walton resided in his hometown of San Diego with his second wife, Lori Matsuoka (m. 1991).

His son Luke became an NBA player, winning both the 2009 and 2010 NBA Finals with the Lakers. The titles made Bill and Luke the first NBA father-son pair to have both won multiple NBA championships. Luke was the head coach of the Lakers (2016–2019), after two years as an assistant for the Golden State Warriors. In April 2019, Luke Walton was named head coach of the Sacramento Kings. Luke was named after Walton's friend and former teammate Maurice Lucas. "Maurice was so important in my life and in little Luke's life," Walton said. "Whenever there was a big moment for little Luke, big Luke would show up unannounced to make sure it all turned out right."

Chris Walton played basketball for San Diego State. He is a real estate executive. Nate Walton played basketball at Princeton. He entered the corporate world and earned his MBA from Stanford University's Graduate School of Business. Walton attended Stanford Law School starting in the fall of 1981 while with the Clippers but did not graduate.

Nate was on the ballot for the 2003 California Recall election, receiving 1,697 votes. He has been highly successful in the oil business.

Adam Walton played at Louisiana State University, Pomona College and the College of Notre Dame in Belmont, California. He was a college assistant coach at San Diego Mesa College. Walton's other brother, Bruce Walton, played in the National Football League with the Dallas Cowboys from 1973 to 1975. They were basketball teammates in high school. Bill followed Bruce in attending UCLA. Bruce played in Super Bowl X, making Bill and Bruce the only brothers to play in the Super Bowl and NBA Finals. Walton's sister Cathy was a youth swimmer and played some basketball at the University of California.

=== Friendships ===
Walton maintained a close lifetime friendship with coach John Wooden, visiting him often. "Coach Wooden is the most influential person in my life outside of my mom and dad, but when we played for him, he was older than our parents, and we thought our parents were the oldest people on earth", Walton said. "So the things he taught us made no sense to us. We thought he was nuts, but when you're hot and when you're on top and it's all happening, you never think. We were so young and we had always won. So we had no real idea how fragile everything was. Everything that Coach Wooden told us eventually came true." Despite his opposition to Walton's protest activities, Wooden also one time bailed Walton out of jail after he was arrested during an anti-Vietnam War protest. On Walton's desk sat a message to him from Coach Wooden: "To Bill Walton, it's the things you learn after you know it all that count. John Wooden."

Walton also considered himself a fan and friend of the writer Ken Kesey. In 2015, he made a visit to the Ken Kesey Collection while on a stop at the University of Oregon. His memoir, Back from the Dead: Searching for the Sound, Shining the Light and Throwing It Down, was released by Simon & Schuster in March 2016. It remained on The New York Times bestseller list for two weeks in April 2016. Walton, who had a service dog, wrote the foreword to the 2015 book Unconditional Honor: Wounded Warriors and their Dogs by author Cathy Scott.

=== Grateful Dead fandom ===
Walton was a fan of the Grateful Dead, whose concerts he started attending in 1967, while he was still in high school. He attended more than 850 Grateful Dead concerts in his lifetime. Walton traveled with the band to Egypt for its 1978 performances at the Giza pyramid complex. To fellow Deadheads, Walton was fondly known as "Grateful Red" and the "Big Red Deadhead" and "World's Tallest Deadhead." In 2001, Walton was inducted into The Grateful Dead Hall of Honor.

Walton wrote the liner notes for the Grateful Dead live albums Dave's Picks Volume 5 in 2013 and Dave's Picks Volume 48 in 2023, both of which feature concerts recorded at UCLA's Pauley Pavilion during Walton's tenure on the university's basketball team. Walton narrated Fire on the Mountain, an action sports documentary featuring Grateful Dead songs, which aired on ESPN in October 2020.

Members of the Grateful Dead and its spin-off group Dead & Company paid tribute to Walton following his death. Grateful Dead drummer Mickey Hart wrote, "Bill was my best friend, the best friend I ever had. He was an amazing person, singular, irreplaceable, giving, loving. His love for our music was beyond description. He called himself the luckiest man in the world but it was us who were lucky—to know him, to share the adventure with him. He was the biggest Deadhead in the world and used our music as the soundtrack to his life." Dead & Company featured a memorial montage to Walton during a performance of "Fire on the Mountain" at their May 30, 2024, concert at the Sphere in Paradise, Nevada.

=== Health and views ===
Walton's ankle problems became so severe that he had both his ankles surgically fused. In 2009, he underwent an eight-hour spinal-fusion surgery. Two titanium rods and four four-inch bolts were inserted in his back. He could not walk to the hospital. After the successful surgery he was hospitalized for a week, and could not move freely for a year. His saga of injury and failed rehabs was connected to the use of painkillers by the medical staff of the Trailblazers to keep players including Walton on court. Walton ended up suing team doctor Dr. Robert Cook for negligence in diagnosing and treating a foot injury suffered by Walton during the 1977–78 season. In a June 8, 2010, interview on The Dan Patrick Show, Walton admitted to contemplating suicide for a time due to the constant pain resulting from injuries sustained during his NBA career.

Walton's political beliefs were known for being radical. During his time at UCLA, Walton was active in campus protests. He was famously arrested during an anti-Vietnam War protest during his junior year at UCLA. Walton, who spoke at Yippie leader Abbie Hoffman's memorial service and funeral, acknowledged spending time with Hoffman when he was a fugitive in the late 1970s. Walton was known as a vegetarian and a meditation practitioner.

=== Death ===
Walton died from colorectal cancer at his home in San Diego, on May 27, 2024, at the age of 71.

A moment of silence was held in Walton's memory before Game 1 of the subsequent NBA Finals on June 6 at TD Garden between the Celtics and the Dallas Mavericks. Walton's family was in attendance, and the Celtics players wore black shooting shirts bearing Walton's name with a tie-dye background while their jerseys had a black band with his name on the shoulder. Celtics team staff wore pins with a similar Walton in tie-dye.

== In popular culture ==
Walton had cameo appearances in the films 88 and 1, Celtic Pride, Little Nicky, Forget Paris and Semi-Pro, and appeared as Sven the Wise in the 2011 Capital One Visigoth SportsNet commercials.

Walton appeared in the 1984 motion picture Ghostbusters. He lent his voice to video games NBA 2K5 and NBA ShootOut 2004.

Walton appeared in the premiere of the third season in the reality TV show Shark Tank on January 20, 2012, where he helped to sell the "Clean Bottle", a water bottle that unscrews at both ends for easier cleaning.

Walton appeared in the music video for the song "Swish Swish" by pop musician Katy Perry featuring rapper Nicki Minaj. He played a color commentator alongside fellow broadcaster Rich Eisen.

Walton was seen attending the 50 Summers of Love concert starring Mark Lindsay, Micky Dolenz, and The Fab Four on July 14, 2017, in San Diego.

== Awards ==
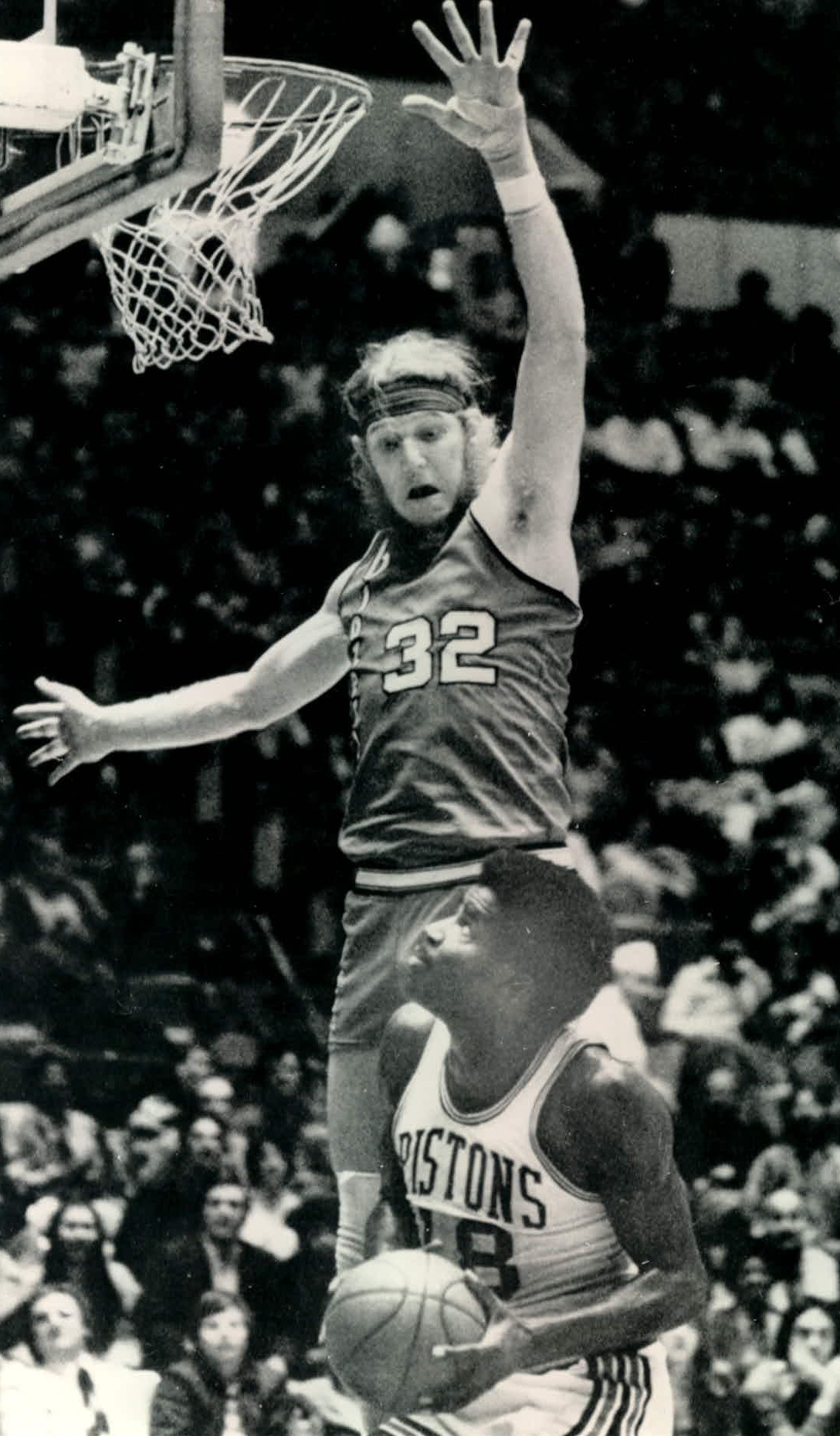
Walton guarding the Pistons' Curtis Rowe in 1976

=== NBA ===
- 2× NBA champion (1977, 1986)
- NBA Finals MVP (1977)
- NBA Most Valuable Player (1978)
- 2× NBA All-Star (1977, 1978)
- All-NBA First Team (1978)
- All-NBA Second Team (1977)
- 2× NBA All-Defensive First Team (1977, 1978)
- NBA Sixth Man of the Year (1986)
- 50 Greatest Players in NBA History
- NBA 75th Anniversary Team

=== College ===
- 2× NCAA champion (1972–1973)
- 2× NCAA Final Four Most Outstanding Player (1972, 1973)
- 3× Naismith College Player of the Year (1972–1974)
- 3× USBWA Player of the Year (1972–1974)
- 3× Adolph Rupp Trophy (1972–1974)
- 3× Helms Foundation College Player of the Year (1972, 1973, 1974)
- 3× Sporting News College Player of the Year (1972–1974)
- 2× AP College Player of the Year (1972, 1973)
- 3× Consensus first-team All-American (1972–1974)
- 3× First-team All-Pac-8 (1972–1974)

=== Broadcasting ===
- Southern California Sports Broadcasters Association's award for "Best Television Analyst/Commentator" (1992, 1993, 1995, 1996, 1998, 1999 and 2000)
- Emmy Award for "Best Live Sports Television Broadcast" (2001)
- CoSIDA Dick Enberg Award (2018)

== Honors ==
- No. 32 retired by Portland Trail Blazers.
- No. 32 retired by UCLA in 1990.
- Walton was the 1973 recipient of the James E. Sullivan Award.
- Walton was inducted into the UCLA Athletics Hall of Fame as part of the inaugural class in 1984.
- In 1990, Walton was inducted by the San Diego Hall of Champions into the Breitbard Hall of Fame.
- In 1991, Walton was the recipient of the NBPA Oscar Robertson Leadership Award.
- Walton was inducted into the Naismith Basketball Hall of Fame in 1993.
- In 1993, Walton was inducted into the Oregon Sports Hall of Fame.
- In 1994, Walton was voted into the Verizon Academic All-American Hall of Fame.
- Walton was inducted into the National High School Hall of Fame in 1997.
- Walton was the inaugural inductee into the Grateful Dead Hall of Honor in 2001.
- Walton received the NBA Retired Players Association Humanitarian Award in 2002.
- In 2006, Walton was inducted into the National Collegiate Basketball Hall of Fame.
- In 2009, he was named one of the "top 50 sportscasters of all time" by the American Sportscasters Association.
- In 2010, Walton was inducted into the California Sports Hall of Fame.
- A bronze statue of Walton was unveiled at Ski Beach Park in San Diego, California's Mission Bay in 2016.
- Walton was inducted into the Boys & Girls Clubs of America Alumni Hall of Fame in 2017.
- The gymnasium at the Boys and Girls Club in Santee, California, near San Diego, was named in his honor in 2018. The Bill Walton Gymnasium is located inside the 26,000-square-foot Brady Family Clubhouse.
- Walton was the recipient of the 2024 Naismith Outstanding Contributors to Men's Basketball Award.

== Career statistics ==
Legend
GP	Games played	GS	Games started	MPG	Minutes per game
FG%	Field goal percentage	3P%	3-point field goal percentage	FT%	Free throw percentage
RPG	Rebounds per game	APG	Assists per game	SPG	Steals per game
BPG	Blocks per game	PPG	Points per game	**Bold**	Career high
†	Won an NBA championship	*	Led the league

=== NBA ===
==== Regular season ====
Year	Team	GP	GS	MPG	FG%	3P%	FT%	RPG	APG	SPG	BPG	PPG
1974–75	Portland	35	—	32.9	.513	—	.686	12.6	4.8	.8	2.7	12.8
1975–76	Portland	51	—	33.1	.471	—	.583	13.4	4.3	**1.0**	1.6	16.1
1976–77†	Portland	65	—	**34.8**	.528	—	.697	**14.4***	3.8	**1.0**	3.2*	18.6
1977–78	Portland	58	—	33.3	.522	—	**.720**	13.2	**5.0**	**1.0**	2.5	**18.9**
1979–80	San Diego	14	—	24.1	.503	—	.593	9.0	2.4	.6	2.7	13.9
1982–83	San Diego	33	32	33.3	.528	—	.556	9.8	3.6	**1.0**	**3.6**	14.1
1983–84	San Diego	55	**46**	26.8	.556	.000	.597	8.7	3.3	.8	1.6	12.1
1984–85	L.A. Clippers	67	37	24.6	.521	.000	.680	9.0	2.3	.7	2.1	10.1
1985–86†	Boston	**80**	2	19.3	**.562**	—	.713	6.8	2.1	.5	1.3	7.6
1986–87	Boston	10	0	11.2	.385	—	.533	3.1	.9	.1	1.0	2.8
Career		468	117	28.3	.521	.000	.660	10.5	3.4	.8	2.2	13.3
All-Star		1	1	31.0	.429	—	1.000	10.0	2.0	3.0	2.0	15.0

==== Playoffs ====
Year	Team	GP	GS	MPG	FG%	3P%	FT%	RPG	APG	SPG	BPG	PPG
1977†	Portland	**19**	—	**39.7**	.507	—	.684	**15.2**	**5.5**	1.1	**3.4**	**18.2**
1978	Portland	2	—	24.5	**.611**	—	.714	11.0	2.0	**1.5**	1.5	13.5
1986†	Boston	16	0	18.2	.581	.000	**.826**	6.4	1.7	.4	.8	7.9
1987	Boston	12	0	8.5	.480	—	.357	2.6	.8	.3	.3	2.4
Career		49	0	24.4	.525	.000	.673	9.1	3.0	.7	1.7	10.8

=== College ===
Year	Team	GP	GS	MPG	FG%	3P%	FT%	RPG	APG	SPG	BPG	PPG
1971–72	UCLA	**30**	—	—	.640	—	**.704**	15.5	—	—	—	**21.1**
1972–73	UCLA	**30**	—	—	.650	—	.569	**16.9**	—	—	—	20.4
1973–74	UCLA	27	—	—	**.665**	—	.580	14.7	**5.5**	—	—	19.3
Career		87	—	—	.651	—	.642	15.7	5.5	—	—	20.3

== Filmography ==
=== Film ===
Year	Title	Role	Notes	Ref.
1984	Ghostbusters		Uncredited cameo	
1995	Forget Paris	Bill Walton (self)		
1996	Celtic Pride	Bill Walton (self)		
1997	The 6th Man	Bill Walton (self)		
1998	He Got Game	Bill Walton (self)	Cameo	
2000	Little Nicky	Bill Walton (self)		
2009	Who Shot Mamba?	Kelli Sherman	Digital release	
2012	The Other Dream Team	Bill Walton (self)	Documentary about the Lithuania men's national basketball team at the 1992 Summer Olympics.	
2018	Uncle Drew	Bill Walton (self)		
2018	Fire on the Mountain	Narrator	Short film	
2023	The Luckiest Guy in the World	Subject	ESPN 30 for 30 – Volume IV: 123	

=== Television ===
Year	Title	Role	Notes	Ref.
1979	The American Sportsman	Bill Walton (self)	"Bill meets Viola" aired April 21, 1979, shot in the Philippines	
1993	Wheel of Fortune	Contestant	Season 10, Episode 165: "Final Friday" (aired May 7, 1993); winner of $63,924 (including value of Paris vacation and car) for the Rex Foundation and Ex-NBA Players Association.	
1997	The Jeff Foxworthy Show	Lester Ligget	Season 2, Episode 23: "Field of Schemes"	
1997	The Sentinel	Bill Walton (self)	Season 3, Episode 2: "Three Point Shot"	
1997	Pacific Blue	Bill Walton (self)	Season 3, Episode 6: "Sandman"	
1999	Snoops	Cop	Season 1, Episode 4: "Higher Calling"	
2001	Inside Schwartz	Bill Walton (self)	Season 1, Episode 1: "Pilot"	
2002	One on One	Bill Walton (self)	Season 1, Episode 22: "He Got Game... Again"	
2003	Wheel of Fortune	Contestant	Season 21, Episode 51: "NBA Week 1" (aired November 27, 2003); paired winning of $6,000 with $10,000 donation to NBA Retired Players Association.	
2004	Less than Perfect	Bill Walton (self)	Season 2, Episode 15: "Live Stinks (Sometimes)"	
2005	Wheel of Fortune	Contestant	Season 23, Episode 36: "NBA Week 1" (aired October 31, 2005); paired winning of $5,000 with $10,000 donation to American Red Cross and NBA Retired Players Association.	
2012	Shark Tank	Himself	Season 3, Episode 1 - Walton helped triathlete Dave Mayer pitch The Clean Bottle, a water bottle which unscrews at the bottom as well as the top to make it easier to keep clean.	
2021	American Dad!	Bill Walton (voice)	Season 16, Episode 4: "Shakedown Steve"	

== Works ==
=== Books ===
- Walton, Bill; Wojciechowski, Gene (1994). Nothing but Net: Just Give Me the Ball and Get out of the Way. New York: Hyperion. ISBN 978-1-56282-793-9.
- Walton, Bill (2016). Back from the Dead. New York: Simon & Schuster. ISBN 978-1-4767-1686-2.

== See also ==
- List of NBA annual rebounding leaders
- List of NBA annual blocks leaders
- List of NBA career playoff rebounding leaders
- Bill Walton Classic
