= 1973 Dallas Cowboys season =

NFL team season

- Owner: Clint Murchison, Jr.
- General manager: Tex Schramm
- Head coach: Tom Landry
- Home stadium: Texas Stadium

Results
- Record: 10–4
- Division place: 1st NFC East
- Playoffs: Won Divisional Playoffs (vs. Rams) 27–16; Lost NFC Championship (vs. Vikings) 10–27
- Pro Bowlers: None

The 1973 Dallas Cowboys season was their 14th in the league. The team matched their previous output of 10–4. They qualified for the playoffs for the eighth straight season. After a 4–3 start the Cowboys won six of their last seven games to win the NFC East with a solid 10–4 record.

In the Divisional Playoffs the Dallas Cowboys beat the Los Angeles Rams 27–16 in Texas Stadium to earn their fourth straight Championship Game Appearance. However, not even the home crowd at Texas Stadium could help the Cowboys as they fell to the Minnesota Vikings 27–10. This was Roger Staubach's first full season as the starting quarterback.

Dallas had posted a 7-0 record against former AFL teams after the 1970 merger until it lost 14-7 to defending Super Bowl champion Miami on Thanksgiving Day.

== NFL draft ==
1973 Dallas Cowboys draft
Round	Pick	Player	Position	College	Notes
1	20	Billy Joe Dupree *	TE	Michigan State	
2	46	Golden Richards	WR	Hawaii	
3	53	Harvey Martin *	DE	East Texas State	
4	98	Drane Scrivener	DB	Tulsa	
5	126	Bruce Walton	OT	UCLA	
6	151	Bob Leyen	OG	Yale	
7	176	Rodrigo Barnes	LB	Rice	
8	204	Dan Werner	QB	Michigan State	
9	229	Mike White	DB	Minnesota	
10	254	Carl Johnson	LB	Tennessee	
11	282	Gerald Caswell	OG	Colorado State	
12	307	Jim Arneson	OG	Arizona	
13	332	John Smith	WR	UCLA	
14	360	Bob Thornton	OG	North Carolina	
15	385	Walt Baisy	LB	Grambling	
16	410	John Conley	TE	Hawaii	
17	438	Les Strayhorn	RB	East Carolina	
Made roster † Pro Football Hall of Fame * Made at least one Pro Bowl during career

== Roster ==
Dallas Cowboys 1973 roster
Quarterbacks: 14 Craig Morton; 12 Roger Staubach; Running backs: 32 Walt Garrison; 35 Calvin Hill; 44 Robert Newhouse; 33 Cyril Pinder; 40 Les Strayhorn; Wide receivers: 22 Bob Hayes; 23 Mike Montgomery; 88 Drew Pearson; 83 Golden Richards; Tight ends: 89 Billy Joe DuPree; 84 Jean Fugett	Offensive linemen: 64 Jim Arneson G; 62 John Fitzgerald C; 51 Dave Manders C; 73 Ralph Neely T; 76 John Niland G; 61 Blaine Nye G; 71 Rodney Wallace T/G; 70 Rayfield Wright T; Defensive linemen: 63 Larry Cole DE; 77 Bill Gregory DT/DE; 74 Bob Lilly DT; 79 Harvey Martin DE; 75 Jethro Pugh DT; 67 Pat Toomay DE	Linebackers: 53 John Babinecz OLB; 56 Rodrigo Barnes MLB; 52 Dave Edwards OLB; 55 Lee Roy Jordan MLB; 50 D. D. Lewis OLB; Defensive backs: 31 Benny Barnes CB; 34 Cornell Green SS; 43 Cliff Harris FS; 20 Mel Renfro CB; 46 Mark Washington CB; 41 Charlie Waters CB; Special teams: 81 Marv Bateman P; 15 Toni Fritsch K	Reserve lists: 17 Mike Clark K (IR); 54 Chuck Howley LB (Ret.); 57 Mike Keller MLB (IR); 82 Otto Stowe WR (IR); 87 Billy Truax TE (IR); Taxi Squad: 18 Jack Concannon QB; 45 Larry Robinson RB; 86 John Smith WR; 78 Bruce Walton T; Rookies in italics 40 active, 9 inactive

== Schedule ==
Week	Date	Opponent	Result	Record	Game Site	Attendance	Recap
1	September 16	at Chicago Bears	**W** 20–17	1–0	Soldier Field	49,970	Recap
2	September 24	New Orleans Saints	**W** 40–3	2–0	Texas Stadium	52,715	Recap
3	September 30	**St. Louis Cardinals**	**W** 45–10	3–0	Texas Stadium	64,729	Recap
4	October 8	at **Washington Redskins**	**L** 7–14	3–1	RFK Stadium	54,314	Recap
5	October 14	at Los Angeles Rams	**L** 31–37	3–2	Los Angeles Memorial Coliseum	81,428	Recap
6	October 21	**New York Giants**	**W** 45–28	4–2	Texas Stadium	58,741	Recap
7	October 28	at **Philadelphia Eagles**	**L** 16–30	4–3	Veterans Stadium	63,300	Recap
8	November 4	Cincinnati Bengals	**W** 38–10	5–3	Texas Stadium	54,944	Recap
9	November 11	at **New York Giants**	**W** 23–10	6–3	Yale Bowl	70,128	Recap
10	November 18	**Philadelphia Eagles**	**W** 31–10	7–3	Texas Stadium	59,375	Recap
11	November 22	Miami Dolphins	**L** 7–14	7–4	Texas Stadium	58,089	Recap
12	December 2	at Denver Broncos	**W** 22–10	8–4	Mile High Stadium	51,508	Recap
13	December 9	**Washington Redskins**	**W** 27–7	9–4	Texas Stadium	62,195	Recap
14	December 16	at **St. Louis Cardinals**	**W** 30–3	10–4	Busch Memorial Stadium	43,946	Recap

Division opponents are in bold text

=== Standings ===
NFC East
	W	L	T	PCT	DIV	CONF	PF	PA	STK
Dallas Cowboys	10	4	0	.714	6–2	8–3	382	203	W3
Washington Redskins	10	4	0	.714	6–2	8–3	325	198	W1
Philadelphia Eagles	5	8	1	.393	3–4–1	3–7–1	310	393	L1
St. Louis Cardinals	4	9	1	.321	3–5	4–7	286	365	L1
New York Giants	2	11	1	.179	1–6–1	1–9–1	226	362	L4

== Season summary ==
=== Week 1 at Bears ===
Week One: Dallas Cowboys (0–0) at Chicago Bears (0–0)

Quarter	1	2	3	4	Total
Cowboys	0	17	0	3	20
Bears	3	0	7	7	17

at Soldier Field, Chicago, Illinois

- Date: September 16
- Game time: 1:00 p.m. CST
- Game weather: 55 °F (13 °C)
- Game attendance: 49,970
- Box Score

Game information

First quarter

- CHI – Mac Percival 33-yard field goal. Bears 3–0.

Second quarter

- DAL – Toni Fritsch 25-yard field goal. Tie 3–3.
- DAL – Otto Stowe 21-yard pass from Roger Staubach (Toni Fritsch kick). Cowboys 10–3.
- DAL – Bob Hayes 18-yard pass from Roger Staubach (Toni Fritsch kick). Cowboys 17–3.

Third quarter'

- CHI – Ike Hill 59-yard punt return (Mac Percival kick). Cowboys 17–10.

Fourth quarter

- CHI – Carl Garrett 15-yard run (Mac Percival kick). Tie 17–17.
- DAL – Toni Fritsch 11-yard field goal. Cowboys 20–17.

Top passers

- DAL – Roger Staubach – 9/22, 91 yards, 2 TD, 2 INT
- CHI – Bobby Douglass – 6/13, 52 yards, INT

Top rushers

- DAL – Calvin Hill – 31 rushes, 130 yards
- CHI – Jim Harrison – 16 rushes, 70 yards

Top receivers

- DAL – Calvin Hill – 4 receptions, 28 yards
- CHI – Jim Harrison – 4 receptions, 30 yards

=== Week 2 ===
Team	1	2	3	4	Total
Saints	0	3	0	0	3
• Cowboys	12	0	21	7	40

- Date: September 24
- Location: Texas Stadium, Irving, Texas
- Game start: 8:00 p.m.
- Game weather: 76 °F (24 °C); wind 17 mph (27 km/h)
- Television network: ABC

Scoring summary
Q1	DAL	Calvin Hill 7 yard run (Toni Fritsch kick)	DAL 7–0
Q1	DAL	Safety, O'Neal tackled by B. Barnes in end zone	DAL 9–0
Q1	DAL	Toni Fritsch 27 yard field goal	DAL 12–0
Q2	NO	Happy Feller 9 yard field goal	DAL 12–3
Q3	DAL	Robert Newhouse 3 yard run (Toni Fritsch kick)	DAL 19–3
Q3	DAL	Robert Newhouse 2 yard pass from Roger Staubach (Toni Fritsch kick)	DAL 26–3
Q3	DAL	Mike Montgomery 7 yard pass from Craig Morton (Toni Fritsch kick)	DAL 33–3
Q4	DAL	Les Strayhorn 1 yard run (Toni Fritsch kick)	DAL 40–3

=== Week 3 ===
Team	1	2	3	4	Total
Cardinals	0	0	3	7	10
• Cowboys	14	10	7	14	45

- Date: September 30
- Location: Texas Stadium
- Game start: 2:00 p.m. EST
- Game weather: 71 °F (22 °C); wind 5 mph (8.0 km/h)

Scoring summary
Q1	DAL	DuPree 8 yard pass from Staubach (Fritsch kick)	DAL 7–0
Q1	DAL	Hill 19 yard run (Fritsch kick)	DAL 14–0
Q2	DAL	Fritsch 24 yard field goal	DAL 17–0
Q2	DAL	Staubach 1 yard run (Fritsch kick)	DAL 24–0
Q3	STL	Bakken 16 yard field goal	DAL 24–3
Q3	DAL	DuPree 2 yard pass from Staubach	DAL 31–3
Q4	DAL	Richards 53 yard pass from Staubach (Fritsch kick)	DAL 38–3
Q4	STL	Anderson 1 yard run (Bakken kick)	DAL 38–10
Q4	DAL	DuPree 1 yard pass from Staubach (Fritsch kick)	DAL 45–10

=== Week 10 ===
Team	1	2	3	4	Total
Eagles	3	7	0	0	10
• Cowboys	0	14	7	10	31

- Date: November 18
- Location: Texas Stadium • Irving, Texas
- Game start: 1:00 p.m.
- Game weather: 70 °F (21 °C) • Wind 14 mph (23 km/h)

Scoring summary
1	PHI	Tom Dempsey 17 yard field goal	Eagles 3–0
2	PHI	Charle Young 80 yard pass from Roman Gabriel (Tom Dempsey kick)	Eagles 10–0
2	DAL	Roger Staubach 1 yard run (Toni Fritsch kick)	Eagles 10–7
2	DAL	Walt Garrison 2 yard pass from Roger Staubach (Toni Fritsch kick)	Cowboys 14–10
3	DAL	Bob Hayes 28 yard pass from Roger Staubach (Toni Fritsch kick)	Cowboys 21–10
4	DAL	Walt Garrison 1 yard run (Toni Fritsch kick)	Cowboys 28–10
4	DAL	Toni Fritsch 23 yard field goal	Cowboys 31–10

== Playoffs ==
Round	Date	Opponent	Result	Game Site	Attendance	Recap
Divisional	December 23, 1973	Los Angeles Rams	W 27–16	Texas Stadium	64,291	Recap
NFC Championship	December 30, 1973	Minnesota Vikings	L 10–27	Texas Stadium	60,272	Recap

== Publications ==
The Football Encyclopedia ISBN 0-312-11435-4
Total Football ISBN 0-06-270170-3
Cowboys Have Always Been My Heroes ISBN 0-446-51950-2
