= Bruce Walton =

Bruce Walton may refer to:

- Bruce Walton (American football) (1951–2019), American football player
- Bruce Walton (baseball) (born 1962), American baseball player
