= Marc Raab =

American football player (born 1969)

No. 50, 57
- Position: Center

Personal information
- Born: January 26, 1969 (age 57); San Diego, California, U.S.
- Listed height: 6 ft 3 in (1.91 m)
- Listed weight: 265 lb (120 kg)

Career information
- High school: Helix (La Mesa, California)
- College: USC
- NFL draft: 1992: undrafted

Career history
- Washington Redskins (1992–1993); San Diego Chargers (1998)
- Stats at Pro Football Reference

Marc A. Raab (born January 26, 1969) is an American former professional football player who was an offensive lineman in the National Football League (NFL). He played college football for the USC Trojans.

== Early life ==
Despite growing up in the San Diego area in California, Raab was a Washington Redskins fan. His grandfather was a trainer and equipment manager for the team in the 1930s.

Raab attended and played high school football at Helix High School in La Mesa, California.

== College career ==
He played college football at the University of Southern California, where he was a long snapper for the Trojans.

== Professional career ==
Raab played in the NFL for the Washington Redskins and the San Diego Chargers.
