= Todd Watkins =

American football player (born 1983)

No. 19
- Position: Wide receiver

Personal information
- Born: June 22, 1983 (age 43); San Diego, California, U.S.
- Listed height: 6 ft 2 in (1.88 m)
- Listed weight: 190 lb (86 kg)

Career information
- High school: Helix (La Mesa, California)
- College: BYU
- NFL draft: 2006: 7th round, 218th overall pick

Career history
- Arizona Cardinals (2006); Atlanta Falcons (2007–2008)*; Oakland Raiders (2008–2009); New York Giants (2011)*
- * Offseason or practice squad member only

Awards and highlights
- First-team All-MW (2004)

Career NFL statistics
- Receptions: 8
- Receiving yards: 90
- Stats at Pro Football Reference

Todd Edward Watkins (born June 22, 1983) is an American former professional football player who was a wide receiver in the National Football League (NFL). He was selected by the Arizona Cardinals in the seventh round of the 2006 NFL draft. He played college football for the BYU Cougars.

He was also a member of the Atlanta Falcons, Oakland Raiders, and New York Giants.

== Early life ==
Watkins was a multi-sport star at Helix High School in La Mesa, California. He lettered in football, volleyball, soccer, and track; he was the first athlete in 25 years to accomplish that feat at Helix High. As a football player, he earned all-county honors during his junior and senior seasons. His teammates included former NFL starters Reggie Bush and Alex Smith; the team won the 2000 San Diego Section Division II CIF Football championship.

== College career ==
=== Junior college ===
Watkins enrolled at Norfolk State but redshirted during the 2001 season. He transferred to Grossmont (California) Junior College and played in ten games during the 2002 season. As a wide receiver, he finished the season with 11 receptions for 299 yards and 4 touchdowns. However, his greatest contributions to the team came as a placekicker: he made 10 of 11 field goals and 46 of 49 PAT kicks.

In his second season at Grossmont, Watkins elevated his performance as a receiver. He caught 40 passes for 915 yards and 8 touchdowns, leading the Griffins to a 13–1 record and the Foothill Valley Conference championship. At placekicker, he made 12 of 15 field goals and 50 of 51 PAT kicks. He totaled 134 points (combined receiving and kicking)- the highest total in the conference. He was named Region III Offensive Player of the Year for 2003 and received First Team All-American recognition from JC Gridwire and Junior College Athletic Bureau.

=== BYU ===
Watkins transferred to Brigham Young University in 2004 and immediately earned a starting position at wide receiver. The Cougars opened up the 2004 season against Notre Dame, and Watkins made an instant impact. His first reception as a Cougar was a spectacular 50-yard catch against double coverage; the play set up a touchdown on BYU's first possession of the game. Late in the fourth quarter of that game, Watkins made a spectacular 37-yard reception (despite pass interference by the defense); the catch secured a crucial first down for BYU and sealed the Cougars’ 20–17 victory over the Irish.

Watkins gained national media attention with a career best performance against Boise State in the fourth game of the season. The Broncos held Watkins in check during the first half, but he was unstoppable in the second half. He finished with 9 receptions for 211 yards. He caught a 79-yard touchdown pass from John Beck in the third quarter, and added a 52-yard grab in the fourth quarter. BYU lost the game, but Watkins had established himself as a dangerous weapon for the Cougars.

For the season, Watkins totaled 52 receptions for 1,042 yards and 6 touchdowns. He averaged 94.7 receiving yards per game, a Mountain West Conference (MWC) record. He averaged 20.0 yards per reception- impressive enough that Sports Illustrated named him the best deep threat in the nation. For his efforts, Watkins was named First Team All-MWC and Honorable Mention All-American.

Expectations were high for Watkins as he entered his senior season at BYU. However, with a new head coach (Bronco Mendenhall) and a new offensive coordinator (Robert Anae), BYU's offense relied heavily on shorter passing routes and Beck threw fewer deep passes to Watkins. Also, with the departure of star freshman receiver Austin Collie, opposing defenses focused their pass coverage schemes directly at Watkins. He was often double-teamed (and sometimes tripled-team); consequently, his statistics declined in the 2005 season. He still finished with respectable numbers: 49 receptions for 678 yards and a team-high 9 touchdowns. His best game of the season was against TCU: he caught 7 passes for 176 yards and 3 touchdowns. Unfortunately, he also dropped three sure touchdowns and fumbled once; BYU lost the game 51–50 in overtime. Watkins ended his college career with a strong showing against California in the Las Vegas Bowl: 5 catches for 93 yards and late fourth-quarter touchdown in BYU's 35–28 loss.

== Professional career ==
=== Arizona Cardinals ===
Pre-draft measurables
Height	Weight	Arm length	Hand span	40-yard dash	10-yard split	20-yard split	20-yard shuttle	Three-cone drill	Vertical jump	Broad jump	Bench press
6 ft 2 3/8 in (1.89 m)	202 lb (92 kg)	31 1/4 in (0.79 m)	9 1/4 in (0.23 m)	4.41 s	1.54 s	2.57 s	4.06 s	6.74 s	36.0 in (0.91 m)	9 ft 10 in (3.00 m)	15 reps
All values from NFL Combine/Pro Day

After finishing his college career, Watkins pursued a career in professional football. For many NFL teams, he was an intriguing prospect. He possessed the physical tools needed to have success in the pros, such as strength (325-pound bench press). He also showed an ability to out-leap defenders and make difficult catches. However, during his senior season, Watkins had dropped several wide-open passes and fumbled the ball a few times during important games. His stock declined sharply before the 2006 NFL draft; he was eventually chosen in the seventh round (218th pick overall) by the Arizona Cardinals. He spent most of his rookie season on the Cardinals’ practice squad.

=== Atlanta Falcons ===
In September 2007, he was added to the Atlanta Falcons practice squad after being cut by the Arizona Cardinals following week 4 of preseason.

=== Oakland Raiders ===
In the 2008 off-season, the Oakland Raiders claimed him off waivers. Watkins was released in September 2010.

=== New York Giants ===
On January 6, 2011, Watkins signed a reserve/future with the New York Giants. He was waived on September 2.

== Personal life ==
Currently working in Job Corps Program on the Island of Maui. He is the Student Personnel Officer(SPO) for the Maui Job Corps Satellite Center.
