= Wilbert Olinde =

American basketball player

Personal information
- Born: July 23, 1955 (age 71) New Orleans, Louisiana, U.S.
- Listed height: 6 ft 7 in (2.01 m)

Career information
- High school: Helix (La Mesa, California)
- College: UCLA (1973–1977)
- Position: Small forward
- Number: 35

Career history
- 1977–1987: ASC 1846 Göttingen

Career highlights
- 3× West German champion (1980, 1983, 1984); NCAA champion (1975)

Wilbert Louis Olinde Jr. (born July 23, 1955) is an American-German retired professional basketball player. He played college basketball for the UCLA Bruins, winning a national championship in 1975.

== Career ==
Born in New Orleans, Louisiana, Olinde attended Crawford High School, before transferring to Helix High School in La Mesa, California, in 1971. Olinde averaged 19 points, 15 rebounds and five blocks as a senior and led the Highlanders to a Grossmont League title. He was named the 1973 CIF San Diego Section Player of the Year.

Olinde played college basketball at the University of California, Los Angeles (UCLA) from 1973 to 1977. Playing under coach John Wooden, Olinde won the 1975 NCAA Division I tournament with the Bruins. Olinde saw two minutes of action in the 1975 National Semifinal against Louisville, but did not play in the championship game against Kentucky. A 6’7’’ (2.01 metres) forward, Olinde played a total of 70 games for UCLA during his college career, averaging 2.3 points and 1.9 rebounds a game. In 1976 and 1977, he was presented with the UCLA Faculty Athletic Representative Award for academic achievement and team contribution.

In 1977, Olinde accepted an offer to move to West-Germany to play professional basketball for ASC 1846 Göttingen, coached by his fellow countryman and former UCLA player Terry Schofield. With Göttingen, Olinde won the West German national championship three times (1980, 1983, 1984) and the West German Cup competition twice (1984, 1985). In 1983, he was granted German citizenship. Olinde retired in 1987 due to cancer.

Olinde, who initially planned to come to Germany for one year, stayed in Germany after his playing career. After working in the assurance and finance business, he founded his own company in 2003, offering coaching for individuals and groups. In 2018, the story of Olinde's life was published in a book (Germany for one season - The true story of Wilbert Olinde Jr.), written by Christoph Ribbat.

His son Louis Olinde is a professional basketball player.

== Biography ==
- Christoph Ribbat: Deutschland für eine Saison. Die wahre Geschichte des Wilbert Olinde Jr. (Germany for one season - The true story of Wilbert Olinde Jr.), Suhrkamp, 2017.
