= Barry Pressing =

- Born: 1948 (age 77–78); San Diego, California, U.S.
- Education: University of Berkeley
- Known for: Sculpture and oversized paintings
- Movement: Contemporary Art
- Website: hfish.com.au

Barry "H.Fish" Pressing (born in 1948) is an American-born contemporary artist and sculptor living in Beechworth, Victoria, Australia. He is best known as H.Fish after his childhood nickname and his H.Fish Studios.

== Early life and education ==
Pressing grew up in La Mesa, California, nine miles east of downtown San Diego, where he graduated from Helix High School. He attended California College of the Arts in Berkeley, California and graduated from San Diego State University.

== Career ==
His artistic career began with creating poster art for Jimi Hendrix and Janis Joplin. In 1970, he opened a combination hot-rod shop/art studio called Hog Fish, so named after his childhood nickname. The studio was influenced by surf art, chopper, and hot-rod fabrication. In addition, as a contributor at the time to the underground comix movement, he illustrated comics, including with psychedelic poster designer Rick Griffin and cartoonist Robert Crumb at the comic magazine Zap Comix.

Pressing relocated to Australia in 2003, moving his studio there. His artwork regularly appears in galleries and at art festivals. In 2014, a collection of 34 pieces of his work that took two years to complete was on display at an exhibition titled "Visions" at the Manning Regional Gallery in Taree in New South Wales.

He uses a series of odd-shaped canvases, along with a mixture of enamels, lacquers, and urethanes. His inspiration comes from his "surfing heydays in the US and Hawaii in the early '60s" as well as "psychedelic poster art he created in San Francisco during the 'hippie movement,'" as noted by the Great Lakes Advocate.

In December 2019, for one month, Pressing's contemporary works were on display at the solo H.Fish Art Exhibition at the Arcadia Gallery in Beechworth.

== Personal life ==
Pressing lives in Beechworth, in north-east Victoria, with his wife Kerry.
