= Evan Arapostathis =

American football player (born 1963)

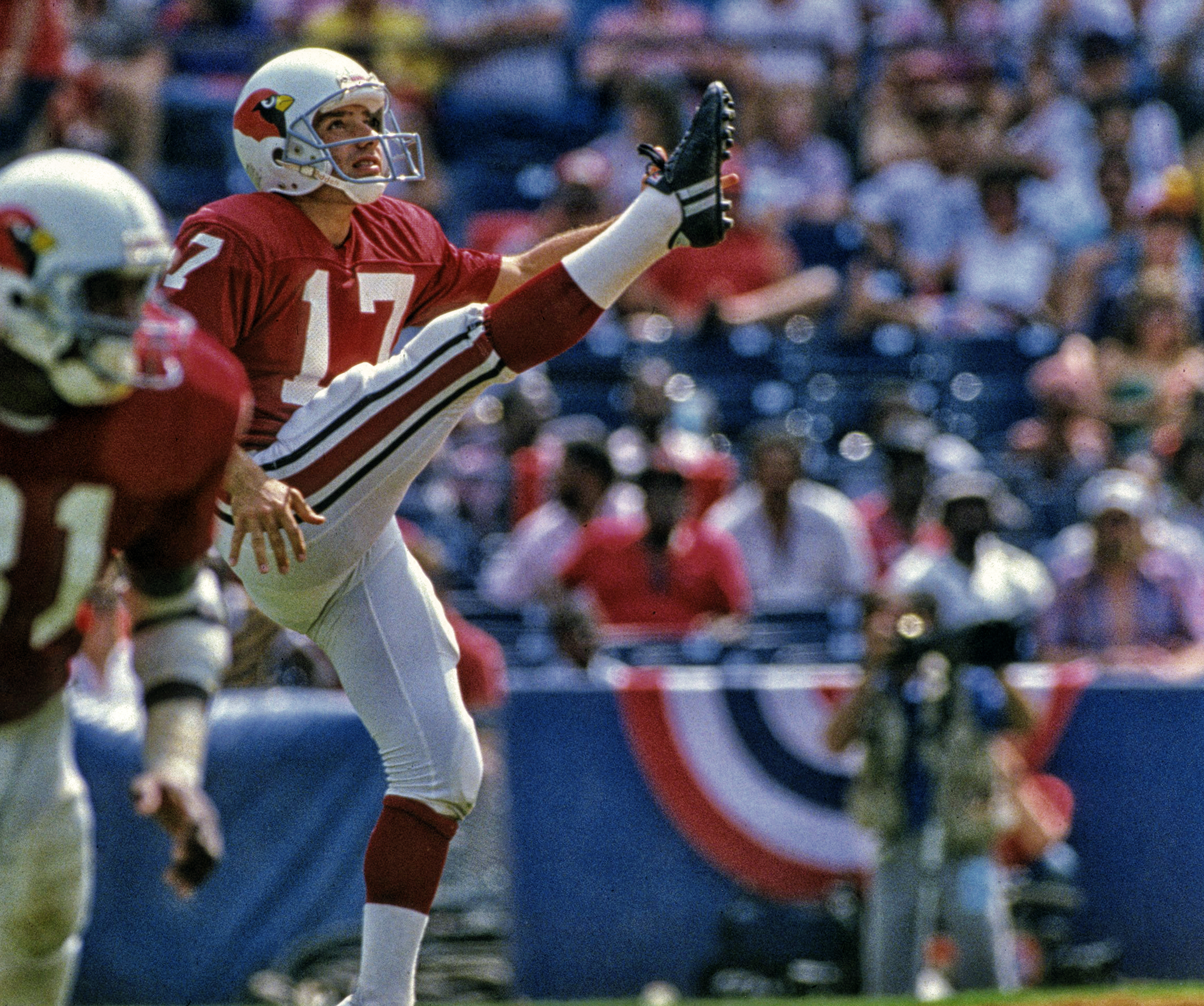

No. 17
- Position: Punter

Personal information
- Born: October 30, 1963 (age 63); San Diego, California, U.S.
- Listed height: 5 ft 9 in (1.75 m)
- Listed weight: 160 lb (73 kg)

Career information
- High school: Helix (La Mesa, California)
- College: Eastern Illinois
- NFL draft: 1986: undrafted

Career history
- St. Louis Cardinals (1986); Cincinnati Bengals (1987)*; Dallas Cowboys (1987)*; Denver Broncos (1988)*
- * Offseason or practice squad member only

Career NFL statistics
- Punts: 30
- Punting yards: 1,140
- Punting yard average: 38
- Stats at Pro Football Reference

Evan Anthony Arapostathis (born October 30, 1963) is an American former professional football player who was a punter for the St. Louis Cardinals in the National Football League (NFL). He played one season for the Cardinals in 1986.

== Playing career ==
Growing up in San Diego County, California, Arapostathis attended Helix High School in La Mesa. After two years at Grossmont College in El Cajon, he transferred to Eastern Illinois University, where he was both their kicker and punter for two years.

In 1986, Arapostathis signed as a free agent with the St. Louis Cardinals, where he was primarily used on kickoffs during the preseason. With veteran punter Carl Birdsong and rookie kicker John Lee also on the roster, the Cardinals eventually cut him. However, St. Louis later cut Birdsong, and re-signed Arapostathis for the season opener. In his NFL debut against the Los Angeles Rams, he punted eight times and kicked off twice. Arapostathis played for five games before St. Louis cut him, signing Greg Cater as his replacement. Arapostathis averaged 38.0 yards on 30 punts, and was ranked 13th out of 14 punters in the National Football Conference with a net average of 32.5.

In 1987, he signed with the Denver Broncos as a replacement player during the NFL strike that season.

== Later life ==
Arapostathis was a graduate assistant for the San Diego State Aztecs, overseeing their kickers. He ran the ABCD Kicking Camps with former NFL kicking specialists Darren Bennett, John Carney and Brad Daluiso. He later worked in the information technology industry before returning to football in 2019 as the vice president for the San Diego Strike Force of the Indoor Football League.
