= Helix High School =

Helix Charter High School

Location
- 7323 University Avenue; La Mesa, California 91942; United States; 32°45′16″N 117°2′14″W

Information
- Type: Charter public comprehensive secondary
- Motto: Once a Scottie, Always a Scottie
- Established: 1952
- Founder: Johnny Aguilar
- School district: Grossmont Union High School District
- Principal: Paula Ann Trevino
- Staff: 105.59 (FTE)
- Grades: 9–12
- Enrollment: 2,544 (2023–2024)
- Student to teacher ratio: 24.09
- Colors: Green and gray
- Nickname: Scotties/Highlanders
- Accreditation: Western Association of Schools and Colleges (WASC)
- Newspaper: Highland Fling
- Yearbook: Tartan
- Website: www.helixcharter.net

Helix High School, or Helix Charter High School, is a charter high school in La Mesa, California, built in 1952. It received its charter in 1998. Helix is part of Grossmont Union High School District, and serves a mid-level socioeconomic community. It has a student body of approximately 2,400 students. Helix serves parts of La Mesa, Lemon Grove, and Spring Valley; however, as a charter school, all high school students in the state of California are eligible to attend.

Helix High School is accredited by the Western Association of Schools and Colleges (WASC) and was named a California Distinguished School in 2001 and 2009.

== History ==
Helix Charter High School opened as the second high school in Grossmont Union High School District in September 1951, to relieve record enrollment of 3000 at Grossmont High School. Its first principal was Benton Hart. In November 1950, East County voters overwhelmingly approved a local bond issue for $1.9 million that financed "the University Avenue high school." Helix's first year of studies was held at Grossmont while the new campus was being built. The two schools operated on double sessions that year.

Helix, receiving half of Grossmont High School's students, attended class in the afternoon. Grossmont's 1500 students attended in the morning. Because of rapid population growth in the area, Helix soon grew overcrowded itself. This resulted in plans to build and open El Cajon Valley High School four years after the opening of Helix.

== Remodeling ==
Since the opening of the school, much of the campus and technology have deteriorated or become outdated. With voter approval of Proposition H in 2004 and Proposition U in 2008, Helix High School will undergo remodeling projects. These projects include a new administration building, a new science building, a new performing arts center, and the remodeling of all standard classrooms.

The remodeling of the campus has already started, and has been completed for buildings 10, 100, 200, 300, 400, 500, 600, 700, 1100, 1140, 1200 the new science building (1800), the performing arts center (900) and the lecture hall (1300), which officially opened in January 2014. The remaining buildings to be remodeled include 1000 (Gym), and 1600 (cafeteria). Building 800 has been demolished, and the new Administration/Student Services Office is located in its old location. In addition to the renovation efforts of the campus buildings, all of the landscaping on the school grounds will be rehabilitated.

== Traditions ==
=== Bagpipe Band ===
Helix Charter's pipe band includes several pipers and a drum corps consisting of several snare drummers, tenor drummers, and one bass drummer. During autumn, the bagpipe band accompanies the Helix Highlander Band in parades, football games, and sometimes field competitions. Additionally, they march the varsity football team out onto the field before home games. During the rest of the year, the pipe band frequently performs at paid as well as volunteer gigs, and competes at various Scottish Highland Games in Southern California. The bagpipe band is funded by the Helix Instrumental Music Association.

=== Battle for the Musket ===
Every year since the school's opening in 1952, Helix and Grossmont High School have competed against each other for this musket, given to the winner of the Grossmont vs. Helix varsity football game. Typically, this football game is one of the most attended of the season. This is just one of several weapon-themed rivalry games that Helix holds with the surrounding high schools.

== Notable alumni ==
- Lalo Alcaraz, 1982, American cartoonist most famous for creating the first nationally syndicated, politically themed Latino daily comic strip La Cucaracha
- Evan Arapostathis, 1981, former NFL punter
- Reggie Bush, 2003, former NFL running back for the New Orleans Saints, Miami Dolphins, Detroit Lions, San Francisco 49ers, and the Buffalo Bills
- Chuck Cecil, 1983, former NFL free safety for the Green Bay Packers, Phoenix Cardinals, and Houston Oilers; formerly defensive coordinator for the Tennessee Titans
- Kerry Chater, 1964, songwriter; bass guitarist for Gary Puckett and the Union Gap
- Jalen Davis, 2014, NFL cornerback
- Karl Dorrell, 1982, college football coach
- Bruce Gillingham, 1977, U.S. Navy Surgeon General
- Dennis Hopper, 1954, actor, artist, and film director
- Cordelia Mendoza, 1967, antiques expert, appraiser and philanthropist
- Wilbert Olinde, 1973, basketball player
- Kyra Phillips, 1986, news anchor, CNN
- Barry Pressing, 1967, contemporary artist and sculptor living in Australia
- Marc Raab, former NFL center
- Jake Reed, 2011, baseball player
- Brandon Sanders, former NFL defensive back
- Cathy Scott, 1967, true crime author and national journalist
- Keionte Scott, 2020, college football cornerback for the Miami Hurricanes
- Josh Simmons, 2022, NFL offensive tackle for the Kansas City Chiefs
- Alex Smith, 2002, former NFL quarterback, San Francisco 49ers, Kansas City Chiefs, Washington Redskins / Football Team, and #1 overall pick in the 2005 NFL draft
- Casey Tiumalu, 1979, former NFL running back
- Levine Toilolo, 2008, NFL tight end for the Atlanta Falcons, San Francisco 49ers and Detroit Lions
- Bill Walton, 1970, sportscaster and former National Basketball Association (NBA) Hall of Fame center Portland Trail Blazers, Boston Celtics and San Diego Clippers (now the Los Angeles Clippers); Center for the UCLA Bruins
- Bruce Walton, former NFL offensive lineman for the Dallas Cowboys
- Todd Watkins, 2001, former NFL wide receiver for the Oakland Raiders
- Leon White, 1980, former NFL linebacker, 1986–1991 Cincinnati Bengals, 1992–1993 Los Angeles Rams

== See also ==
- List of high schools in San Diego County, California
- List of high schools in California
