= Ankle problems =

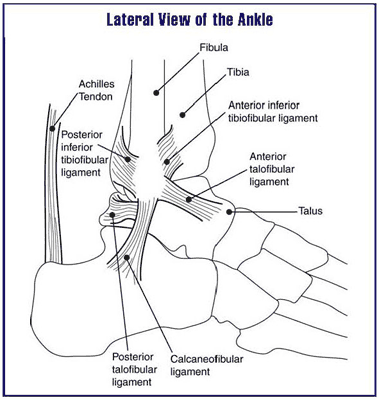
- Ankle of human
- Symptoms: swollen, bruising, redness, numbness, instability, burning pain, stiffness, weakness
- Duration: around 7-14 days, severe problems might take months to cure.
- Types: Gout, arthritis, tendinitis, nerve damage, blocked blood vessels, joint infection, Injuries, muscle weakness, relapse of existing problem
- Causes: Usually Sprained ankle
- Diagnostic method: Medical history, Medical examination, X-ray, Magnetic resonance imaging (MRI) or CT scan

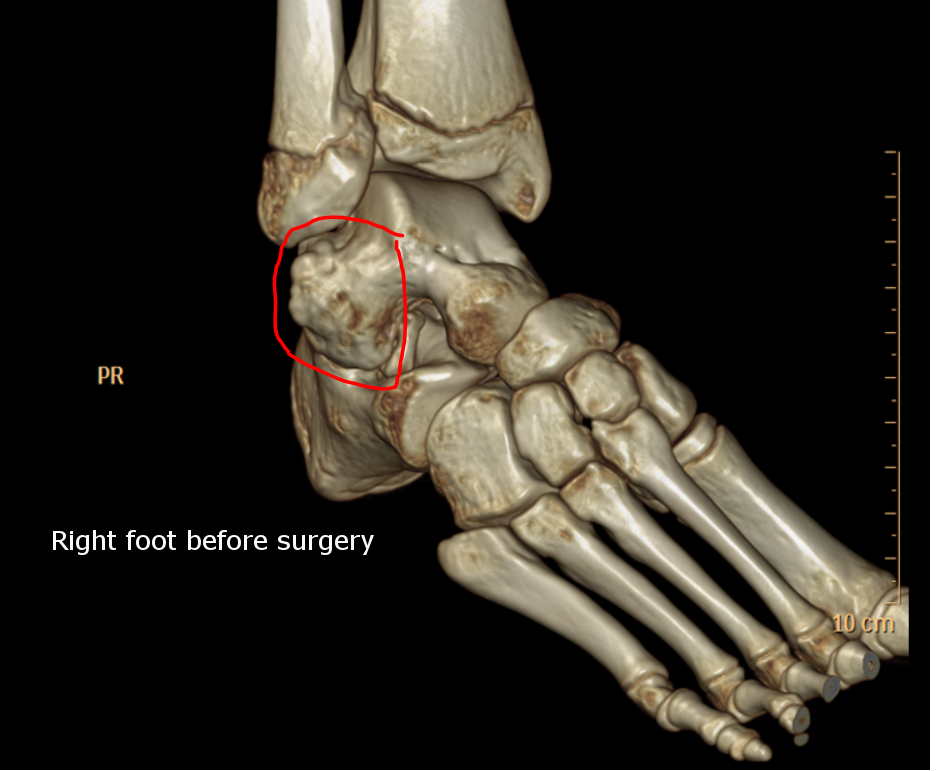
A computertomographie of a 13-year-old child who was diaognised by "Trevor disease", which is an additional bone growth on the knee or ankle.

Ankle problems occur frequently, having symptoms of pain or discomfort in the ankles.

Mild ankle pain can often be cured by home treatments, although these may be slow to take effect. Specialized physicians are needed if the condition is severe, especially if it has been caused by injury.

== Symptoms ==
The ankle joint marks the point of connection between the bones of the leg and those of the foot, and controls the raising and lowering of the foot. The ankle is often considered to comprise not only the ankle joint itself but also the structures surrounding it at the lower end of the leg and the beginning of the foot proper. Ankle pain may be symptomatic of inflammation of, or injury to, any of the tissues present in the region, including the joint space, cartilage, tendons, ligaments, bones, and muscles. Ankle pain may be associated with the following symptoms:

- swelling
- bruising
- redness
- numbness or tingling
- instability
- burning pain
- inability to bear weight on the affected ankle
- stiffness
- weakness

Tenderness/pain, difficulty in flexing the joint, difficulty in walking, difficulty in bearing weight, stiffness and swelling form a constellation of symptoms which may be indicative of osteoarthritis.

== Causes ==
Frequent causes of ankle problems include injuries such as sprains and medical conditions such as arthritis (specifically osteoarthritis).

=== Sprained ankle ===
One of the most frequent causes of ankle pain (accounting for around 85 percent of total ankle problems - according to the National University of Health Sciences (NUHS)) a sprain occurs when the ankle is twisted, causing the ligaments to be over-stretched, or even (in the most severe cases) torn. Most ankle sprains are lateral sprains that occur when the foot rolls, causing the side of the ankle to be pressed to the ground. Small blood vessels rupture in the process and cause the ankle to swell and damage may also occur to the ligaments, these constituting a short band of tough, flexible, fibrous connective tissues holding the bones together. Rolling of the ankle may also damage cartilage or tendons. A sprained ankle will usually display signs of swelling and bruising for one to two weeks, although more serious cases may take several months to heal fully.

Athletes run a greater risk of sprained ankles - more especially players of ball games such as football, basketball and volleyball.

Out of every 10 people with severe ankle sprains, between 1 and 2 suffer chronic instability of the affected joint.

A sprained ankle may remain permanently weakened and of compromised stability following the healing of the injury. The biggest risk factor for an ankle sprain is a previous ankle sprain, according to a review published by the American Academy of Family Physicians (AAFP).

=== Osteoarthritis ===
Arthritis is an inflammation of the joints, causing swelling in and around the joints of the body and their surrounding soft tissues. This inflammation can cause pain and stiffness and is one of the most common causes of ankle problems.

In many types of arthritis, progressive joint degeneration in the joint occurs and smooth "buffered" cartilage is gradually lost, causing the bones rub against each other and wear, as well as the soft joint tissue. Arthritis can be unbearably painful and can lead ultimately to limited movement, serious loss of joint function and even deformity of affected joints.

There are many types of arthritis, of which osteoarthritis is very common cause of ankle pain. This is caused by cumulative wear and tear of the joint and may also result in swelling and deformity. It occurs most frequently in the old, with the likelihood of osteoarthritis increasing with age.

==== How osteoarthritis influences the feet and ankles ====
The human foot has 28 bones and more than 30 joints. The following foot joints are those most commonly affected by osteoarthritis:

- The three foot joints, including the heel, the medial and the mid-foot bone
- big toe and foot bone joint
- Joints at which the ankle and the tibia meet

==== Rheumatoid arthritis ====
Rheumatoid arthritis constitutes yet another possible cause of pain in the ankle.

==== Tendonitis ====
Tendonitis is one of the most common causes of pain in the foot or ankle. The muscles of the legs, feet and ankles are fixed to the bones by tendons, which are strong rope-like structures. Tendonitis is inflammation around a tendon, leading to pain experienced during and after activity, which abates temporarily, but returns upon resumption of exercise.

Common forms of tendonitis affecting the foot and ankle include Achilles tendonitis, posterior tibial tendonitis, peroneal tendinosis, flexor tendonitis, and extensor tendonitis. Self-care measures usually heal these injuries in a few weeks

===== Common causes =====
- Overuse: The most common cause of tendonitis is overuse, which means that the tendon is overstretched and may be slightly pulled apart or torn. This happens when activities increase, including everything from walking to participating in competitive sports.
- Sports Injury: Rapid lateral movements and changes in direction place stress on the tendons of the ankle. Such movements are common in trail running, soccer, and basketball.
- Abnormal foot structure: Problems such as flat feet or high arches can create muscle imbalances that put pressure on one or more tendons.
- Trauma: Injury to the foot or ankle can cause tendinitis. This can happen by sudden and powerful actions such as jumping. Another form of trauma is chronic friction on the shoe, which usually occurs at the top of the foot or heel, causing tendinitis in these areas.
- Medical conditions: Certain diseases that cause general inflammation can cause tendinitis. Inflammation of rheumatoid arthritis, gout and spondyloarthropathy can cause Achilles tendinitis or posterior tendonitis.
- Nerve damage such as sciatica
- Blocked blood vessels

=== Joint infection ===
Septic arthritis is a type of arthritis caused by bacterial or fungal infection of the ankle region.

=== Injuries ===
Injuries can cause ankle problems, for example, tripping or going over on the ankle.

== Diagnosis ==
Diagnosis of ankle problems, especially of osteoarthritis involves:

- Medical history
- Medical examination
- X-ray
- Magnetic resonance imaging (MRI) or CT scan
