= Les Strayhorn =

American football player (born 1951)

No. 40
- Position: Running back

Personal information
- Born: September 1, 1951 (age 75); Trenton, North Carolina, U.S.
- Listed height: 5 ft 10 in (1.78 m)
- Listed weight: 205 lb (93 kg)

Career information
- High school: Jones (Trenton)
- College: East Carolina
- NFL draft: 1973: 17th round, 438th overall pick

Career history
- Dallas Cowboys (1973–1974); Hamilton Tiger-Cats (1975–1976); Montreal Alouettes (1976–1977)

Awards and highlights
- Grey Cup champion (1977)

Career NFL statistics
- Games played: 22
- Stats at Pro Football Reference

Les Strayhorn (born September 1, 1951) is an American former professional football player who was a running back in the National Football League (NFL) for the Dallas Cowboys. He also played in the Canadian Football League (CFL) for the Hamilton Tiger-Cats and Montreal Alouettes. He played college football for the East Carolina Pirates.

== Early life ==
Strayhorn attended Jones High School in Trenton, North Carolina. He accepted a scholarship from East Carolina University.

Although he was hampered by a severe shoulder injury early in his college career, he was able to overcome it and become a three-year starter at running back. He finished his college career with 373 carries for 1,673 yards, a 4.5-yard average and 8 touchdowns.

=== Dallas Cowboys ===
Strayhorn was selected by the Dallas Cowboys in the 17th round (438th overall) of the 1973 NFL draft. In 1974, he was a backup at fullback. He played 2 seasons, while suiting up for 24 games, rushing for 128 yards with a 5.8-yard average and one touchdown. He was waived on September 9, 1975.

=== Hamilton Tiger-Cats ===
In 1975, he was signed by the Hamilton Tiger-Cats of the Canadian Football League. He played 2 seasons, rushing for 342 yards and one touchdown. On August 6, 1976, he was released to make room for running back Jimmy De Ratt.

=== Montreal Alouettes ===
In 1976, he was signed by the Montreal Alouettes based on a recommendation from Tom Landry, who at the time were coached by future hall of famer Marv Levy. On July 5, 1977, he tore ligaments in his left knee and was lost for the season, still, he was a part of the Grey Cup championship team.

== Personal life ==
After football, he worked in the New Hanover County Department of Social Services. His brother Ken also played football at East Carolina University.
