= Bruce Walton (American football) =

American football player (1951–2019)

No. 78
- Position: Guard / Tackle

Personal information
- Born: June 14, 1951; San Diego, California, U.S.
- Died: October 18, 2019 (aged 68)
- Listed height: 6 ft 6 in (1.98 m)
- Listed weight: 251 lb (114 kg)

Career information
- High school: Helix (La Mesa, California)
- College: UCLA
- NFL draft: 1973: 5th round, 126th overall pick

Career history
- Dallas Cowboys (1973–1975)

Awards and highlights
- Third-team All-American (1972); First-team All-Pac-8 (1972)

Career NFL statistics
- Games played: 33
- Games started: 1
- Fumble recoveries: 1
- Stats at Pro Football Reference

Bruce Edward Walton (June 14, 1951 – October 18, 2019) was an American professional football player who was an offensive lineman in the National Football League (NFL) for the Dallas Cowboys. He played college football for the UCLA Bruins.

== Early life ==
Walton was the oldest son of William Theodore "Ted" Walton Jr. and Gloria Walton and was born in San Diego, California. The family was Catholic. Walton attended Helix High School where he played football and basketball. He accepted a football scholarship from the University of California, Los Angeles.

He was named a starter as a sophomore. As a senior, he helped his team rush for 3,810 yards and score 38 rushing touchdowns—both school records at the time, while blocking for All-American running back Kermit Johnson.

He was a three-year starter at offensive tackle and graduated with the school record for consecutive starts (32).

== Professional career ==
Walton was selected in the fifth round (126th overall) of the 1973 NFL draft by the Dallas Cowboys. As a rookie, he appeared in seven games, backing up the guard and tackle positions, while seeing most of his playing time on special teams. He returned one kickoff for eleven yards.

In his second NFL season in 1974, Walton was the backup at left tackle behind Rayfield Wright. He appeared in thirteen games, starting against the Houston Oilers in place of an injured Wright; the Cowboys were 8–6 and missed the postseason for the first time in nine years. In 1975, he continued his special teams and backup duties; a knee injury in the loss to the Green Bay Packers in week five caused him to miss two games. He played in Super Bowl X and with Bill Walton, became the only brother combination to play in the Super Bowl and in the NBA Finals.

In 1976, Walton did not report to the team and retired because of a knee injury.

== Personal life ==
Walton was the older brother of NBA hall of famer Bill Walton. After his playing career was over, Bruce Walton managed the 98.1 KIFM radio station in the San Diego area. He introduced the "lites out" smooth jazz format. In 1996, his company sold KIFM to the Jefferson Pilot group for $28.75 million. In 2002, Walton joined Terramar Retail Center as vice president for development overseeing Seaport Village. He was named a Director for Competitor Group (CGI) in 2012.

He played a football player in the 1976 Walt Disney film Gus.

== Death ==
In 2017, Walton suffered a bout of the flu that ended up causing brain injuries and kidney failure. He managed to recover in time for his daughter Harmony's wedding in May 2019. Walton died on October 18, 2019.
