= 1971–72 Michigan Wolverines men's basketball team =

American college basketball season

1971–72 Michigan Wolverines men's basketball
- Conference: Big Ten Conference
- Record: 14–10 (9–5 Big Ten)
- Head coach: Johnny Orr
- Assistant coaches: Fred Snowden; Dick Honig (freshmen)
- MVP: Henry Wilmore
- Captains: Wayne Grabiac; Dave Hart
- Home arena: Crisler Arena

1971–72 Big Ten Conference men's basketball standings
	Conf.				Overall
Team	W		L	PCT	W		L	PCT
No. 11 Minnesota	11	–	3	.786	17	–	6	.739
No. 19 Ohio State	10	–	4	.714	18	–	6	.750
No. 17 Indiana	9	–	5	.643	17	–	8	.680
Michigan	9	–	5	.643	14	–	10	.583
Michigan State	6	–	8	.429	13	–	11	.542
Wisconsin	6	–	8	.429	13	–	11	.542
Purdue	6	–	8	.429	12	–	12	.500
Illinois	5	–	9	.357	14	–	10	.583
Iowa	5	–	9	.357	11	–	13	.458
Northwestern	3	–	11	.214	5	–	18	.217
Rankings from AP Poll

The 1971–72 Michigan Wolverines men's basketball team represented the University of Michigan in intercollegiate college basketball during the 1971–72 NCAA University Division men's basketball season. The team played its home games at Crisler Arena on the school's campus in Ann Arbor, Michigan.

Under the direction of head coach Johnny Orr, the team finished with a 14–10 overall record and a 9–5 conference record. This tied the team for third in the Big Ten Conference but failed to get an invitation to either the 1972 NCAA Men's Division I Basketball Tournament or the 1972 National Invitation Tournament.

Wayne Grabiac and Dave Hart served as team captains, while Henry Wilmore earned team MVP. The team earned the Big Ten scoring offense statistical championship with an 81.8 average in conference games. It also led the conference in field goal percentage with a 45.3% in conference games. Additionally, the team led the conference in rebounding with a 51.6 average in conference games.

The team was in the Associated Press Top Twenty Poll for four of the sixteen weeks of the season, rising as high as number nine after starting the season ranked at number thirteen. However, the team ended the season unranked in both the final UPI Coaches' Poll and the final AP Poll.

During the season, the team beat two of the four ranked opponents that it faced (#16 Illinois by a 75–70 margin on January 11, 1972, at Assembly Hall in Champaign and #6 Ohio State on January 29, 1972, at Crisler Arena by an 88–78 margin). The team was led by Consensus second team All-American Wilmore.

== Roster ==
1971–72 Michigan Wolverines men's basketball team
Players
Coaches

Pos.	#	Name	Height	Weight	Year	Hometown
C	15	Ken Brady	6 ft 9 in (2.06 m)	235 lb (107 kg)	So	Flint, Michigan
F	40	Wayne Grabiec	6 ft 6 in (1.98 m)	195 lb (88 kg)	Sr	Downers Grove, Illinois
G	44	Dave Hart	5 ft 8 in (1.73 m)	160 lb (73 kg)	Sr	Ypsilanti, Michigan
F	25	Henry Wilmore	6 ft 4 in (1.93 m)	205 lb (93 kg)	Jr	New York, New York

Head coach

- Johnny Orr

Assistant coach(es)

Legend

- (C) Team captain
- (S) Suspended
- (I) Ineligible
- (W) Walk-on
- Injured
- Current redshirt

== Rankings ==
Ranking movements Legend: ██ Increase in ranking ██ Decrease in ranking
	Week															
Poll	Pre	1	2	3	4	5	6	7	8	9	10	11	12	13	14	Final
AP Poll	13	9								20				16		

== Team players drafted into the NBA ==
Four players from this team were selected in the NBA draft.

Year	Round	Pick	Overall	Player	NBA Club
1972	3	14	44	Wayne Grabiec	Boston Celtics
1973	4	9	61	Ken Brady	Detroit Pistons
1973	5	9	78	Henry Wilmore	Detroit Pistons
1973	14	1	189	Ernie Johnson	Philadelphia 76ers
