= 1971–72 Princeton Tigers men's basketball team =

American college basketball season

1971–72 Princeton Tigers men's basketball

1972 National Invitation Tournament, Quarterfinals
- Conference: Ivy League
- Record: 20–7 (12–2, 2nd Ivy)
- Head coach: Pete Carril
- Captain: Alfred M. Dufty, Jr.
- Home arena: Jadwin Gymnasium

The 1971–72 Princeton Tigers men's basketball team represented the Princeton University in intercollegiate college basketball during the 1971–72 NCAA University Division men's basketball season. The head coach was Pete Carril and the team captain was Alfred M. Dufty, Jr. The team played its home games in the Jadwin Gymnasium on the University campus in Princeton, New Jersey. The team was the runner-up in the Ivy League and earned itself an invitation to the 16-team 1972 National Invitation Tournament. The team was the first Princeton team to participate in the National Invitation Tournament.

The team posted a 20–7 overall record and a 12–2 conference record. The team won its March 19, 1972, first round contest in the NIT at New York City's Madison Square Garden against the Indiana Hoosiers by a 68–60 margin but lost in the quarterfinal round to the Niagara Purple Eagles 65–60 on March 21.

During the season, the team spent three weeks of the sixteen-week season ranked in the Associated Press Top Twenty Poll, peaking at number fourteen and ending the season unranked. The team also finished the season unranked in the final UPI Coaches' Poll. The team was the highest scoring team in school history.

Brian Taylor, who led the conference in scoring with a 26.2 average in conference games, was selected to the All-Ivy League first team. He was a 1972 NCAA Men's Basketball All-American selection by many organizations: first team (Sporting News); second team (National Association of Basketball Coaches, Converse) and third team (Associated Press, United Press International) as well as a general selection by the Helms Foundation. Taylor was selected in the 1972 NBA draft by the Seattle SuperSonics with the 23rd overall selection in the 2nd round while Reggie Bird was selected by the Atlanta Hawks with the 55th overall selection in the 4th Round.

== Rankings ==
Ranking movement Legend: ██ Increase in ranking. ██ Decrease in ranking.
Poll	Pre	Wk 1	Wk 2	Wk 3	Wk 4	Wk 5	Wk 6	Wk 7	Wk 8	Wk 9	Wk 10	Wk 11	Wk 12	Wk 13	Wk 14	Final
AP Top 20 Poll	-	-	18	-	-	-	-	14	17	-	-	-	-	-	-	-
