= 1971–72 Indiana Hoosiers men's basketball team =

American college basketball season

1971–72 Indiana Hoosiers men's basketball

Old Dominion Classic Champions

National Invitation Tournament, First round
- Conference: Big Ten Conference

Ranking
- AP: No. 17
- Record: 17–8 (9–5 Big Ten)
- Head coach: Bobby Knight (1st season)
- Assistant coaches: Dave Bliss (1st season); John Hulls; Bob Weltlich
- Captain: Joby Wright
- Home arena: Assembly Hall

1971–72 Big Ten Conference men's basketball standings
	Conf.				Overall
Team	W		L	PCT	W		L	PCT
No. 11 Minnesota	11	–	3	.786	17	–	6	.739
No. 19 Ohio State	10	–	4	.714	18	–	6	.750
No. 17 Indiana	9	–	5	.643	17	–	8	.680
Michigan	9	–	5	.643	14	–	10	.583
Michigan State	6	–	8	.429	13	–	11	.542
Wisconsin	6	–	8	.429	13	–	11	.542
Purdue	6	–	8	.429	12	–	12	.500
Illinois	5	–	9	.357	14	–	10	.583
Iowa	5	–	9	.357	11	–	13	.458
Northwestern	3	–	11	.214	5	–	18	.217
Rankings from AP Poll

The 1971–72 Indiana Hoosiers men's basketball team represented Indiana University. Their head coach was Bobby Knight, who was in his first year. The team played its home games in the newly constructed Assembly Hall in Bloomington, Indiana, and was a member of the Big Ten Conference.

The Hoosiers finished the regular season with an overall record of 17–8 and a conference record of 9–5, finishing 3rd in the Big Ten Conference. Missing out on the NCAA Tournament, Indiana was invited to play in the National Invitation Tournament; however, the Hoosiers lost in the first round, bringing Knight's first season to an end.

== Roster ==
No.	Name	Position	Ht.	Year	Hometown
20	Frank Wilson	G	6–3	Jr.	Bluffton, Indiana
22	Bootsie White	G	5–8	Jr.	Hammond, Indiana
23	Steve Heiniger	G	5–10	So.	Fort Wayne, Indiana
24	Dave Shepherd	G	5–11	So.	Carmel, Indiana
32	Steve Downing	C	6–8	Jr.	Indianapolis, Indiana
33	Jerry Memering	F/C	6–7	Jr.	Vincennes, Indiana
42	John Ritter	F	6–5	Jr.	Goshen, Indiana
43	Rick Ford	F	6–5	Sr.	Cloverdale, Indiana
44	Joby Wright	F	6–8	Sr.	Savannah, Georgia
54	Kim Pemberton	G	6–3	Jr.	Osgood, Indiana

== Schedule/results ==
Date time, TV	Rank^{#}	Opponent^{#}	Result	Record	Site city, state
Regular season
12/1/1971*		Ball State	W 84–77	1–0	Assembly Hall; Bloomington, Indiana
12/4/1971*		Miami	W 65–50	2–0	Assembly Hall; Bloomington, Indiana
12/6/1971*		No. 14 Kansas	W 59–56	3–0	Assembly Hall; Bloomington, Indiana
12/11/1971*		vs. No. 7 Kentucky; Indiana–Kentucky rivalry	W 90–89 ^{2OT}	4–0	Freedom Hall; Louisville, Kentucky
12/15/1971*	No. 12	at Ohio	L 70–79	4–1	Convocation Center; Athens, Ohio
12/18/1971*	No. 12	Notre Dame	W 94–29	5–1	Assembly Hall; Bloomington, Indiana
12/22/1971*	No. 8	at Butler	W 85–74	6–1	Hinkle Fieldhouse; Indianapolis, Indiana
12/28/1971*	No. 7	vs. No. 8 BYU; Old Dominion Classic	W 61–50	7–1	Hampton Coliseum; Norfolk, Virginia
12/29/1971*	No. 7	at Old Dominion; Old Dominion Classic	W 88–86	8–1	Hampton Coliseum; Norfolk, Virginia
1/4/1972*	No. 5	at Northern Illinois	L 71–85	8–2	Chick Evans Field House; DeKalb, Illinois
1/8/1972	No. 5	at Minnesota	L 51–52	8–3 (0–1)	Williams Arena; Minneapolis
1/15/1972	No. 17	Wisconsin	L 64–66 ^{OT}	8–4 (0–2)	Assembly Hall; Bloomington, Indiana
1/22/1972		at Ohio State	L 74–80	8–5 (0–3)	St. John Arena; Columbus, Ohio
1/29/1972		at Michigan State	L 73-83	8–6 (0–4)	Jenison Fieldhouse; East Lansing, Michigan
2/5/1972		Michigan State	W 83–69	9–6 (1–4)	Assembly Hall; Bloomington, Indiana
2/8/1972		Minnesota	W 61–42	10–6 (2–4)	Assembly Hall; Bloomington, Indiana
2/12/1972		at Wisconsin	W 84–76 ^{OT}	11–6 (3–4)	Wisconsin Field House; Madison, Wisconsin
2/19/1972		Iowa	W 86–79	12–6 (4–4)	Assembly Hall; Bloomington, Indiana
2/22/1972		at Illinois; Rivalry	W 90–71	13–6 (5–4)	Assembly Hall; Champaign, Illinois
2/26/1972		at Purdue; Rivalry	L 69–70	13–7 (5–5)	Purdue Arena; West Lafayette, Indiana
2/29/1972		No. 16 Michigan	W 79–75	14–7 (6–5)	Assembly Hall; Bloomington, Indiana
3/4/1972		No. 14 Ohio State	W 65–57	15–7 (7–5)	Assembly Hall; Bloomington, Indiana
3/7/1972	No. 20	at Northwestern	W 72–67	16–7 (8–5)	Welsh-Ryan Arena; Evanston, Illinois
3/11/1972	No. 20	Purdue; Rivalry	W 62–48	17–7 (9–5)	Assembly Hall; Bloomington, Indiana
NIT
3/18/1972*	No. 17	vs. Princeton; First Round	L 60–68	17–8 (9–5)	Madison Square Garden; New York City
*Non-conference game. ^{#}Rankings from AP Poll. (#) Tournament seedings in parentheses.

== Team players drafted into the NBA ==
Round	Pick	Player	NBA club
2	18	Joby Wright	Seattle SuperSonics
