= 1971–72 Michigan State Spartans men's basketball team =

American college basketball season

1971–72 Michigan State Spartans men's basketball
- Conference: Big Ten Conference
- Record: 13–11 (6–8 Big Ten)
- Head coach: Gus Ganakas (3rd season)
- Assistant coaches: Robert Nordmann; Matthew Aitch
- Captains: Ronald Gutkowski; Patrick Miller
- Home arena: Jenison Fieldhouse

1971–72 Big Ten Conference men's basketball standings
	Conf.				Overall
Team	W		L	PCT	W		L	PCT
No. 11 Minnesota	11	–	3	.786	17	–	6	.739
No. 19 Ohio State	10	–	4	.714	18	–	6	.750
No. 17 Indiana	9	–	5	.643	17	–	8	.680
Michigan	9	–	5	.643	14	–	10	.583
Michigan State	6	–	8	.429	13	–	11	.542
Wisconsin	6	–	8	.429	13	–	11	.542
Purdue	6	–	8	.429	12	–	12	.500
Illinois	5	–	9	.357	14	–	10	.583
Iowa	5	–	9	.357	11	–	13	.458
Northwestern	3	–	11	.214	5	–	18	.217
Rankings from AP Poll

The 1971–72 Michigan State Spartans men's basketball team represented Michigan State University in the 1971–72 NCAA Division I men's basketball season as members of the Big Ten Conference. They played their home games at Jenison Fieldhouse in East Lansing, Michigan and were coached by Gus Ganakas in his third year as head coach of the Spartans. They finished the season 13–11, 6–8 in Big Ten play to finish in a tie for fifth place.

== Previous season ==
The Spartans finished the 1970–71 season 10–14, 4–10 in Big Ten play, to finish in a tie for seventh place.

== Roster and statistics ==
1971–72 Michigan State Spartans men's basketball team
No	Name	Pos	Year	Height	Pts	Reb
10	Brad VanPelt	F	JR	6–5	1.2	1.2
11	Gary Ganakas	G	JR	5–5	4.8	2.3
15	John Benington	G	JR	6–1	0.4	–
21	Tery Fagan	G	SO	5–11	0.4	–
22	Bill Kilgore	C	JR	6–7	14.8	11.1
24	Ron Gutkowski	F	SR	6–6	3.3	2.3
25	Billy Joe DuPree	F	SR	6–4	1.0	–
31	Mike Robinson	G	SO	5–11	24.8	3.0
32	Jeff VanderLende	C	JR	6–7	–	–
34	Tyrone Lewis	G	SO	6–1	2.7	1.1
35	Pat Miller	G/F	SR	6–2	9.2	5.4
41	Allen Smith	F	JR	6–7	9.0	5.6
42	Brian Breslin	F	JR	6–5	8.0	5.5
44	Mike Ridley	F	SO	6–4	1.5	0.6
43	William Cohrs	C	SR	6–6	0.4	1.2

== Schedule and results ==
Date time, TV	Rank^{#}	Opponent^{#}	Result	Record	Site city, state
Regular season
Dec 1, 1971*		at Missouri	L 67–77	0–1	Brewer Fieldhouse; Columbia, MO
Dec 4, 1971*		South Alabama	W 87–72	1–1	Jenison Fieldhouse; East Lansing, MI
Dec 11, 1971*		Western Michigan	W 66–65	2–1	Jenison Fieldhouse; East Lansing, MI
Dec 13, 1971*		at No. 7 Kentucky	W 91–85	3–1	Memorial Coliseum; Lexington, KY
Dec 17, 1971*		vs. Colorado State; Volunteer Classic semifinals	W 67–63	4–1	Stokely Center; Knoxville, TN
Dec 18, 1971*		at Tennessee; Volunteer Classic championship	L 61–85	4–2	Stokely Center; Knoxville, TN
Dec 20, 1971*		at Butler	W 77–71	5–2	Hinkle Fieldhouse; Indianapolis, IN
Dec 27, 1971*		vs. Texas A&M; Bluebonnet Classic semifinals	W 67–65	6–2	Hofheinz Pavilion; Houston, TX
Dec 28, 1971*		at Houston; Bluebonnet Classic championship	L 73–106	6–3	Hofheinz Pavilion; Houston, TX
Jan 8, 1972		at Michigan; Rivalry	L 75–83	6–4 (0–1)	Crisler Arena; Ann Arbor, MI
Jan 11, 1972		Wisconsin	W 83–76	7–4 (1–1)	Jenison Fieldhouse; East Lansing, MI
Jan 18, 1972		at Northwestern	L 69–76	7–5 (1–2)	Welsh-Ryan Arena; Evanston, IL
Jan 22, 1972		No. 17 Minnesota	L 57–67	7–6 (1–3)	Jenison Fieldhouse; East Lansing, MI
Jan 29, 1972		Indiana	W 83–73	8–6 (2–3)	Jenison Fieldhouse; East Lansing, MI
Feb 1, 1972*		Notre Dame	W 98–74	9–6	Jenison Fieldhouse; East Lansing, MI
Feb 5, 1972		at Indiana	L 69–83	9–7 (2–4)	Assembly Hall; Bloomington, IN
Feb 8, 1972		Illinois	W 89–79	10–7 (3–4)	Jenison Fieldhouse; East Lansing, MI
Feb 12, 1972		at Iowa	W 100–91	11–7 (4–4)	Iowa Field House; Iowa City, IA
Feb 19, 1972		at Purdue	L 68–92	11–8 (4–5)	Mackey Arena; West Lafayette, IN
Feb 26, 1972		Iowa	L 98–102	11–9 (4–6)	Jenison Fieldhouse; East Lansing, MI
Feb 29, 1972		at Wisconsin	L 74–101	11–10 (4–7)	Wisconsin Field House; Madison, WI
Mar 4, 1972		No. 16 Michigan	W 96–62	12–10 (5–7)	Jenison Fieldhouse; East Lansing, MI
Mar 7, 1972		at Ohio State	L 73–92	12–11 (5–8)	St. John Arena; Columbus, OH
Mar 11, 1972		Northwestern	W 57–54	13–11 (6–8)	Jenison Fieldhouse; East Lansing, MI
*Non-conference game. ^{#}Rankings from AP Poll. (#) Tournament seedings in parentheses. Source
