= 1970–71 Michigan Wolverines men's basketball team =

American college basketball season

1970–71 Michigan Wolverines men's basketball

NIT, Quarterfinals
- Conference: Big Ten Conference
- Record: 19–7 (12–2 Big Ten)
- Head coach: Johnny Orr
- Assistant coaches: Fred Snowden; Dick Honig (freshmen)
- MVPs: Dan Fife; Henry Wilmore
- Captain: Dan Fife
- Home arena: Crisler Arena

1970–71 Big Ten Conference men's basketball standings
	Conf.				Overall
Team	W		L	PCT	W		L	PCT
No. 10 Ohio State	13	–	1	.929	20	–	6	.769
Michigan	12	–	2	.857	19	–	7	.731
Purdue	11	–	3	.786	18	–	7	.720
Indiana	9	–	5	.643	17	–	7	.708
Illinois	5	–	9	.357	11	–	12	.478
Minnesota	5	–	9	.357	11	–	13	.458
Michigan State	4	–	10	.286	10	–	14	.417
Iowa	4	–	10	.286	9	–	15	.375
Wisconsin	4	–	10	.286	9	–	15	.375
Northwestern	3	–	11	.214	7	–	17	.292
Rankings from AP Poll

The 1970–71 Michigan Wolverines men's basketball team represented the University of Michigan in intercollegiate college basketball during the 1970–71 season. The team played its home games at Crisler Arena on the school's campus in Ann Arbor, Michigan.

Under the direction of head coach Johnny Orr, the team finished second in the Big Ten Conference. Dan Fife served as team captain and shared team co-MVP honors with Henry Wilmore.

Over the course of the season, Ken Brady led the conference in field goal percentage with a 61.7% average in conference games. The team earned the Big Ten scoring offense statistical championship with an 88.4 average in conference games. The team was in the Associated Press Top Twenty Poll for four of the sixteen weeks of the season, rising as high as number twelve. However, the team ended the season unranked in both the final UPI Coaches' Poll and the final AP Poll.

The team defeated two of the four ranked opponents that it faced during the season. The team participated in the sixteen team 1971 National Invitation Tournament where it advanced to the quarterfinals by defeating the Syracuse Orange by an 86–76 margin before falling to the Georgia Tech Yellow Jackets 78–70. The team was led by All-American Henry Wilmore. Dan Fife established the school career field goal percentage record at 57.44% that would last until Loy Vaught ended his career with a 61.7% mark in 1990. He also set the school single season assist average of 5.35 per game that would last until Dave Baxter surpassed it in 1978. The team set the school single-game record for free throws made of 33 on January 23, 1971, against Northwestern, which would be unsurpassed until 1998.

== Roster ==
1970–71 Michigan Wolverines men's basketball team
Players
Coaches

Pos.	#	Name	Height	Weight	Year	Hometown
C	15	Ken Brady	6 ft 9 in (2.06 m)	235 lb (107 kg)	So	Flint, Michigan
G	24	Dan Fife	6 ft 2 in (1.88 m)	188 lb (85 kg)	Sr	Clarkston, Michigan
F	40	Wayne Grabiec	6 ft 6 in (1.98 m)	195 lb (88 kg)	Jr	Downers Grove, Illinois
G	44	Dave Hart	5 ft 8 in (1.73 m)	160 lb (73 kg)	Jr	Ypsilanti, Michigan
G	20	Harry Hayward	6 ft 4 in (1.93 m)	210 lb (95 kg)	Sr	Wildwood, New Jersey
C	34	Tim Nicksic	6 ft 5 in (1.96 m)	215 lb (98 kg)	Sr	East Chicago, Indiana
F	25	Henry Wilmore	6 ft 4 in (1.93 m)	205 lb (93 kg)	So	New York, New York

Head coach

- Johnny Orr

Assistant coach(es)

Legend

- (C) Team captain
- (S) Suspended
- (I) Ineligible
- (W) Walk-on
- Injured
- Current redshirt

== Rankings ==
Ranking movements Legend: ██ Increase in ranking ██ Decrease in ranking
	Week															
Poll	Pre	1	2	3	4	5	6	7	8	9	10	11	12	13	14	Final
AP Poll										20	16	16	12			

== Team players drafted into the NBA ==
Five players from this team were selected in the NBA draft.

Year	Round	Pick	Overall	Player	NBA Club
1971	10	16	168	Dan Fife	Milwaukee Bucks
1972	3	14	44	Wayne Grabiec	Boston Celtics
1973	4	9	61	Ken Brady	Detroit Pistons
1973	5	9	78	Henry Wilmore	Detroit Pistons
1973	14	1	189	Ernie Johnson	Philadelphia 76ers
