= 1970–71 Wisconsin Badgers men's basketball team =

American college basketball season

1970–71 Wisconsin Badgers men's basketball
- Conference: Big Ten Conference
- Record: 9–15 (4–10 Big Ten)
- Head coach: John Powless
- Home arena: UW Fieldhouse

1970–71 Big Ten Conference men's basketball standings
	Conf.				Overall
Team	W		L	PCT	W		L	PCT
No. 10 Ohio State	13	–	1	.929	20	–	6	.769
Michigan	12	–	2	.857	19	–	7	.731
Purdue	11	–	3	.786	18	–	7	.720
Indiana	9	–	5	.643	17	–	7	.708
Illinois	5	–	9	.357	11	–	12	.478
Minnesota	5	–	9	.357	11	–	13	.458
Michigan State	4	–	10	.286	10	–	14	.417
Iowa	4	–	10	.286	9	–	15	.375
Wisconsin	4	–	10	.286	9	–	15	.375
Northwestern	3	–	11	.214	7	–	17	.292
Rankings from AP Poll

The 1970–71 Wisconsin Badgers men's basketball team represented University of Wisconsin–Madison. The head coach was John Powless, coaching his third season with the Badgers. The team played their home games at the UW Fieldhouse in Madison, Wisconsin and was a member of the Big Ten Conference.

== Roster ==
1970–71 Wisconsin Badgers men's basketball team
Players	Coaches
Pos. / # / Name / Height / Weight / Year / Hometown	Head coach: John Powless; Assistant coach(es) Legend: (C) Team captain; (S) Suspended; (I) Ineligible; (W) Walk-on; Injured; Current redshirt

== Schedule ==
Date time, TV	Rank^{#}	Opponent^{#}	Result	Record	Site city, state
Regular Season
12/01/1970*		Eastern Illinois	W 102–84	1–0	UW Fieldhouse; Madison, WI
12/05/1970*		Michigan Tech	W 114–70	2–0	UW Fieldhouse; Madison, WI
12/08/1970*		at Pittsburgh	L 76–81	2–1	Fitzgerald Field House; Pittsburgh, PA
12/12/1970*		Loyola (LA)	W 94–83	3–1	UW Fieldhouse; Madison, WI
12/15/1970*		at Ohio	L 80–81	3–2	Convocation Center; Athens, OH
12/19/1970*		Tulane	W 96–77	4–2	UW Fieldhouse; Madison, WI
12/29/1970*		vs. Texas; Milwaukee Classic	W 89–73	5–2	Milwaukee Arena; Milwaukee, WI
12/30/1970*		vs. No. 3 Marquette; Milwaukee Classic	L 69–72	5–3	Milwaukee Arena; Milwaukee, WI
01/09/1971		Michigan	L 89–90	5–4 (0–1)	UW Fieldhouse; Madison, WI
1/12/1971		at Illinois	L 82–84	5–5 (0–2)	Assembly Hall; Champaign, IL
1/16/1971		at Ohio State	L 69–83	5–6 (0–3)	St. John Arena; Columbus, OH
1/19/1971		Northwestern	W 87–72	6–6 (1–3)	UW Fieldhouse; Madison, WI
2/02/1971*		at No. 1 Marquette	L 75–89	6–7	Marquette Gymnasium; Milwaukee, WI
2/06/1971		Iowa	L 91–93	6–8 (1–4)	UW Fieldhouse; Madison, WI
2/09/1971*		at Southern Illinois	L 75–86	6–9	SIU Arena; Carbondale, IL
2/13/1971		at Northwestern	L 91–101	6–10 (1–5)	Welsh-Ryan Arena; Evanston, IL
2/16/1971		No. 20 Ohio State	L 71–79	6–11 (1–6)	UW Fieldhouse; Madison, WI
2/20/1971		at Michigan State	L 78–97	6–12 (1–7)	Jenison Fieldhouse; East Lansing, MI
2/23/1971		Illinois	W 88–84	7–12 (2–7)	UW Fieldhouse; Madison, WI
2/27/1971		at Iowa	W 89–83	8–12 (3–7)	Iowa Field House; Iowa City, IA
3/02/1971		No. T18 Indiana	W 94–87 ^{2OT}	9–12 (4–7)	UW Fieldhouse; Madison, WI
3/06/1971		at Minnesota	L 98–104	9–13 (4–8)	Williams Arena; Minneapolis, MN
3/09/1971		Purdue	L 77–81	9–14 (4–9)	UW Fieldhouse; Madison, WI
3/13/1971		at Michigan	L 73–93	9–15 (4–10)	Crisler Arena; Ann Arbor, MI
*Non-conference game. ^{#}Rankings from AP Poll. (#) Tournament seedings in parentheses.
