= 1971–72 Illinois Fighting Illini men's basketball team =

American college basketball season

1971–72 Illinois Fighting Illini men's basketball

Gator Bowl Tournament, Champions
- Conference: Big Ten Conference
- Record: 14–10 (5–9 Big Ten)
- Head coach: Harv Schmidt (5th season)
- Assistant coaches: Dick Campbell (5th season); Jim Wright (13th season)
- MVP: Nick Weatherspoon
- Captain: Jim Krelle
- Home arena: Assembly Hall

1971–72 Big Ten Conference men's basketball standings
	Conf.				Overall
Team	W		L	PCT	W		L	PCT
No. 11 Minnesota	11	–	3	.786	17	–	6	.739
No. 19 Ohio State	10	–	4	.714	18	–	6	.750
No. 17 Indiana	9	–	5	.643	17	–	8	.680
Michigan	9	–	5	.643	14	–	10	.583
Michigan State	6	–	8	.429	13	–	11	.542
Wisconsin	6	–	8	.429	13	–	11	.542
Purdue	6	–	8	.429	12	–	12	.500
Illinois	5	–	9	.357	14	–	10	.583
Iowa	5	–	9	.357	11	–	13	.458
Northwestern	3	–	11	.214	5	–	18	.217
Rankings from AP Poll

The 1971–72 Illinois Fighting Illini men's basketball team represented the University of Illinois.

== Regular season ==
The 1971-72 Fighting Illini men's basketball season, led by head coach Harv Schmidt, experienced the a tale of two years, 1971 and 1972. The Fighting Illini opened the season December 1, 1971, with a win over Butler and proceeded to win 7 of their next 8 games, finishing 1971 with an 8–1 record. That streak would continue into January 1972 for one more game, the opening game of the Big Ten season. After beating Northwestern the Fighting Illini would go on to drop 9 of their next 14 games, finishing the season with a 14–10 record, tied for 8th place in the conference.

The brightest spot of the season would shine upon junior forward Nick Weatherspoon. Weatherspoon would return from a terrific sophomore campaign where he scored 381 points, averaging 16.5 points per game and collected 246 rebounds. During this season, 1971–72, he would score 500 total points, averaging 20.8 points and pull down 262 rebounds.

The 1971–72 team's starting lineup included Weatherspoon and Nick Conner at the forward spots, Jim Krelle and Garvin Roberson as guards and Bill Morris at center.

=== Roster ===
1971–72 Illinois Fighting Illini men's basketball team
Players
Coaches

Pos.	#	Name	Height	Weight	Year	Previous school	Hometown
G	10	Garvin Roberson	6 ft 4 in (1.93 m)	185 lb (84 kg)	So	Elkhart Central High School	Elkhart, Indiana
F	12	Nick Weatherspoon	6 ft 6 in (1.98 m)	185 lb (84 kg)	Jr	McKinley High School	Canton, Ohio
G	14	C.J. Schroeder	6 ft 4 in (1.93 m)	195 lb (88 kg)	So	Davenport West High School	Davenport, Iowa
G	21	Larry Cohen	6 ft 2 in (1.88 m)	180 lb (82 kg)	Jr	New Trier East High School	Wilmette, Illinois
G	25	Jim Krelle (C)	6 ft 3 in (1.91 m)	180 lb (82 kg)	Sr	Aurora West High School	Aurora, Illinois
F	30	Mike Wente	6 ft 5 in (1.96 m)	200 lb (91 kg)	So	St. Anthony High School	Effingham, Illinois
G	34	Greg Wilson	6 ft 3 in (1.91 m)	190 lb (86 kg)	So	McKinley High School	Sebring, Ohio
C	35	Bill Morris	6 ft 9 in (2.06 m)	235 lb (107 kg)	So	Beaumont High School	St. Louis, Missouri
F	40	John McBride	6 ft 5 in (1.96 m)	195 lb (88 kg)	Jr	Carl Sandburg High School	Orland Park, Illinois
F	42	Jim Rucks	6 ft 3 in (1.91 m)	205 lb (93 kg)	Jr	Waukegan High School	Waukegan, Illinois
G	43	Kim Jolley	6 ft 6 in (1.98 m)	210 lb (95 kg)	So	Jamaica High School	Indianola, Illinois
F	44	Jed Foster	6 ft 6 in (1.98 m)	205 lb (93 kg)	Jr	Fairfield High School	Fairfield, Illinois
F/C	45	Nick Conner	6 ft 6 in (1.98 m)	195 lb (88 kg)	Jr	East High School	Columbus, Ohio
F/C	54	Jim DeDecker	6 ft 10 in (2.08 m)	220 lb (100 kg)	Jr	Alleman High School	Moline, Illinois

Head coach

- Harv Schmidt (University of Illinois) (5th year)

Assistant coach(es)

- Dick Campbell (5th year)
- Jim Wright (University of Illinois) (13th year)

Legend

- (C) Team captain
- (S) Suspended
- (I) Ineligible
- (W) Walk-on
- Injured
- Current redshirt

Roster

== Schedule ==
Date time, TV	Rank^{#}	Opponent^{#}	Result	Record	Site (attendance) city, state
Non-Conference regular season
12/1/1971*		Butler	W 73-71	1 - 0	Assembly Hall (12,959); Champaign, IL
12/4/1971*		at No. 20 Oklahoma	W 70-65	2 - 0	McCasland Field House (8,326); Norman, OK
12/7/1971*		South Dakota	W 96-56	3 - 0	Assembly Hall (12,206); Champaign, IL
12/10/1971*		at Tulane	W 79-68	4 - 0	Devlin Fieldhouse (3,250); New Orleans, LA
12/11/1971*		vs. Loyola (New Orleans)	W 94-74	5 - 0	Devlin Fieldhouse (1,345); New Orleans, LA
12/16/1971*		Georgia	W 84-78	6 - 0	Assembly Hall (12,447); Champaign, IL
12/23/1971*		at Vanderbilt	L 92-95	6 - 1	Memorial Gymnasium (14,000); Nashville, TN
12/28/1971*		vs. North Carolina State; Gator Bowl Tournament	W 74-72	7 - 1	Jacksonville Coliseum (6,506); Jacksonville, FL
12/29/1971*		vs. Florida; Gator Bowl Tournament	W 76-75	8 - 1	Jacksonville Coliseum (8,248); Jacksonville, FL
Big Ten regular season
1/8/1972		at Northwestern; Rivalry	W 67-63	9 - 1 (1 - 0)	McGaw Memorial Hall (5,885); Evanston, IL
1/11/1972	No. 16	Michigan	W 76-75	9 - 2 (1 - 1)	Assembly Hall (14,836); Champaign, IL
1/15/1972	No. 16	Purdue	L 74-85	9 - 3 (1 - 2)	Assembly Hall (16,017); Champaign, IL
1/28/1972*		vs. Notre Dame	W 81-59	10 - 3	Chicago Stadium (11,255); Chicago, IL
2/5/1972		Northwestern; Rivalry	W 68-59	11 - 3 (2 - 2)	Assembly Hall (13,628); Champaign, IL
2/8/1972		at Michigan State	L 79-89	11 - 4 (2 - 3)	Jenison Fieldhouse (6,132); East Lansing, MI
2/12/1972		at Michigan	L 83-105	11 - 5 (2 - 4)	Crisler Center (12,562); Ann Arbor, MI
2/15/1972		at Iowa; Rivalry	L 84-87	11 - 6 (2 - 5)	Iowa Field House (12,559); Iowa City, IA
2/17/1973		No. 8 Ohio State	W 64-62	12 - 6 (3 - 5)	Assembly Hall (15,236); Champaign, IL
2/22/1972		Indiana; Rivalry	L 71-90	12 - 7 (3 - 6)	Assembly Hall (14,083); Champaign, IL
2/26/1972		Wisconsin	W 91-86	13 - 7 (4 - 6)	Assembly Hall (14,006); Champaign, IL
2/29/1972		at No. 14 Ohio State	L 70-103	13 - 8 (4 - 7)	St. John Arena (13,489); Columbus, OH
3/4/1972		at Minnesota	L 62-91	13 - 9 (4 - 8)	Williams Arena (14,666); Minneapolis, MN
3/7/1972		Iowa; Rivalry	W 91-84	14 - 9 (5 - 8)	Assembly Hall (11,554); Champaign, IL
3/11/1972		at Wisconsin	L 84-97	14 - 10 (5 - 9)	Wisconsin Field House (7,242); Madison, WI
*Non-conference game. ^{#}Rankings from AP Poll. (#) Tournament seedings in parentheses. All times are in Central Time.

== Player stats ==
Player	Games played	Field goals	Free throws	Rebounds	Points
Nick Weatherspoon	24	200	100	262	500
Bill Morris	21	113	93	197	319
Jim Krelle	23	104	70	78	278
Nick Conner	24	101	51	204	253
Larry Cohen	21	42	39	28	123
Garvin Roberson	24	39	42	51	120
Jed Foster	19	38	42	67	118
C.J. Schroeder	21	23	30	33	76
Jim DeDecker	19	20	17	33	57
Jim Rucks	8	8	3	9	19
Greg Wilson	4	5	2	1	12
Mike Wente	7	1	0	6	2

== Awards and honors ==
- Nick Weatherspoon
  - Team Most Valuable Player

== Team players drafted into the NBA ==
- No Players Drafted
