= 1971–72 Wisconsin Badgers men's basketball team =

American college basketball season

1971–72 Wisconsin Badgers men's basketball
- Conference: Big Ten Conference
- Record: 13–11 (6–8 Big Ten)
- Head coach: John Powless
- Home arena: UW Fieldhouse

1971–72 Big Ten Conference men's basketball standings
| | Conf. | | | | Overall |
| Team | W | | L | PCT | W | | L | PCT |
|---|---|---|---|---|---|---|---|---|
| No. 11 Minnesota | 11 | – | 3 | .786 | 17 | – | 6 | .739 |
| No. 19 Ohio State | 10 | – | 4 | .714 | 18 | – | 6 | .750 |
| No. 17 Indiana | 9 | – | 5 | .643 | 17 | – | 8 | .680 |
| Michigan | 9 | – | 5 | .643 | 14 | – | 10 | .583 |
| Michigan State | 6 | – | 8 | .429 | 13 | – | 11 | .542 |
| Wisconsin | 6 | – | 8 | .429 | 13 | – | 11 | .542 |
| Purdue | 6 | – | 8 | .429 | 12 | – | 12 | .500 |
| Illinois | 5 | – | 9 | .357 | 14 | – | 10 | .583 |
| Iowa | 5 | – | 9 | .357 | 11 | – | 13 | .458 |
| Northwestern | 3 | – | 11 | .214 | 5 | – | 18 | .217 |
Rankings from AP Poll

The 1971–72 Wisconsin Badgers men's basketball team represented University of Wisconsin–Madison. The head coach was John Powless, coaching his fourth season with the Badgers. The team played their home games at the UW Fieldhouse in Madison, Wisconsin and was a member of the Big Ten Conference.

== Roster ==
1971–72 Wisconsin Badgers men's basketball team
| Players | Coaches |
|---|---|
| Pos. / # / Name / Height / Weight / Year / Hometown | Head coach: John Powless; Assistant coach(es) Legend: (C) Team captain; (S) Suspended; (I) Ineligible; (W) Walk-on; Injured; Current redshirt |

== Schedule ==
| Date time, TV | Rank^{#} | Opponent^{#} | Result | Record | Site city, state |
Regular Season
| 12/01/1971* | | Michigan Tech | W 107–74 | 1–0 | UW Fieldhouse; Madison, WI |
| 12/04/1971* | | at Tulane | L 70–72 | 1–1 | Devlin Fieldhouse; New Orleans, LA |
| 12/06/1971* | | at Loyola (LA) | W 67–66 | 2–1 | University Sports Complex; New Orleans, LA |
| 12/08/1971* | | DePauw | W 92–69 | 3–1 | UW Fieldhouse; Madison, WI |
| 12/11/1971* | | Northern Michigan | W 104–65 | 4–1 | UW Fieldhouse; Madison, WI |
| 12/13/1971* | | Florida Tech | W 90–58 | 5–1 | UW Fieldhouse; Madison, WI |
| 12/18/1971* | | Pittsburgh | W 80–63 | 6–1 | UW Fieldhouse; Madison, WI |
| 12/27/1971* | | vs. No. 20 Marshall; Milwaukee Classic | L 83–85 | 6–2 | Milwaukee Arena; Milwaukee, WI |
| 12/28/1971* | | vs. Georgetown; Milwaukee Classic | W 82–62 | 7–2 | Milwaukee Arena; Milwaukee, WI |
| 1/03/1972* | | at No. 2 Marquette | L 60–72 | 7–3 | Marquette Gymnasium; Milwaukee, WI |
| 1/08/1972 | | Iowa | W 81–80 | 8–3 (1–0) | UW Fieldhouse; Madison, WI |
| 1/11/1972 | | at Michigan State | L 76–83 | 8–4 (1–1) | Jenison Fieldhouse; East Lansing, MI |
| 1/15/1972 | | at No. 17 Indiana | W 66–64 ^{OT} | 9–4 (2–1) | Assembly Hall; Bloomington, IN |
| 1/18/1972 | | No. 17 Minnesota | L 59–65 | 9–5 (2–2) | UW Fieldhouse; Madison, WI |
| 2/05/1972 | | at No. 9 Ohio State | L 69–79 | 9–6 (2–3) | St. John Arena; Columbus, OH |
| 2/12/1972 | | Indiana | L 76–84 ^{OT} | 9–7 (2–4) | UW Fieldhouse; Madison, WI |
| 2/15/1972 | | at Purdue | W 84–65 | 10–7 (3–4) | Mackey Arena; West Lafayette, IN |
| 2/19/1972 | | at Minnesota | L 73–76 | 10–8 (3–5) | Williams Arena; Minneapolis, MN |
| 2/22/1972 | | Purdue | W 66–60 | 11–8 (4–5) | UW Fieldhouse; Madison, WI |
| 2/26/1972 | | at Illinois | L 86–91 | 11–9 (4–6) | Assembly Hall; Champaign, IL |
| 2/29/1972 | | Michigan State | W 101–74 | 12–9 (5–6) | UW Fieldhouse; Madison, WI |
| 3/04/1972 | | Northwestern | L 82–90 | 12–10 (5–7) | UW Fieldhouse; Madison, WI |
| 3/07/1972 | | at Michigan | L 70–93 | 12–11 (5–8) | Crisler Arena; Ann Arbor, MI |
| 3/11/1972 | | Illinois | W 97–84 | 13–11 (6–8) | UW Fieldhouse; Madison, WI |
*Non-conference game. ^{#}Rankings from AP Poll. (#) Tournament seedings in parentheses.
