= Barry Parkhill =

American basketball player (born 1951)

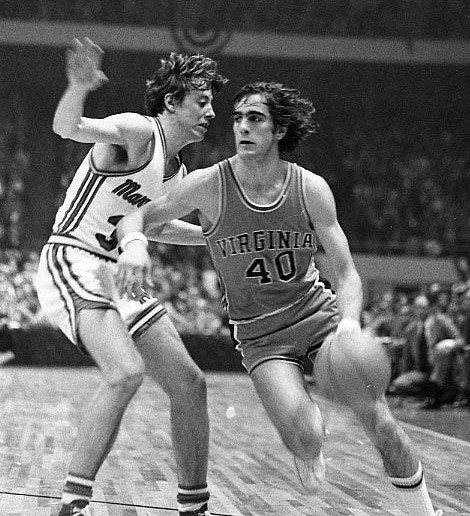

Personal information
- Born: May 10, 1951 (age 75) Philadelphia, Pennsylvania, U.S.
- Listed height: 6 ft 4 in (1.93 m)
- Listed weight: 185 lb (84 kg)

Career information
- High school: State College (State College, Pennsylvania)
- College: Virginia (1970–1973)
- NBA draft: 1973: 1st round, 15th overall pick
- Drafted by: Portland Trail Blazers
- Playing career: 1973–1976
- Position: Shooting guard
- Number: 40
- Coaching career: 1977–1992

Career history

Playing
- 1973–1975: Virginia Squires
- 1975–1976: Spirits of St. Louis

Coaching
- 1977–1978: Virginia (grad. assistant)
- 1978–1983: William & Mary (assistant)
- 1983–1987: William & Mary
- 1989–1990: Saint Michael's
- 1990–1992: Navy (assistant)

Career highlights
- Consensus second-team All-American (1972); Third-team All-American – NABC (1973); ACC Player of the Year (1972); ACC Athlete of the Year (1972); First-team All-ACC (1972); 2× Second-team All-ACC (1971, 1973); No. 40 retired by Virginia Cavaliers
- Stats at Basketball Reference

Barry Parkhill (born May 10, 1951) is an American former professional basketball player from Philadelphia, Pennsylvania who was selected by the Portland Trail Blazers in the first round (15th overall) of the 1973 NBA draft but elected to play in the American Basketball Association (ABA) instead. A 6-foot-4-inch (1.93 m) guard-forward from the University of Virginia, Parkhill played in three ABA seasons for two different teams. He played for the Virginia Squires and the Spirits of St. Louis.

In 2001, Parkhill was inducted into the Virginia Sports Hall of Fame.

== Playing career ==
=== High school ===
Parkhill attended and played basketball for State College High School in State College, Pennsylvania. He is among the all-time scoring leaders and broke the 1,000 point barrier during his senior year.

=== College ===
Parkhill was named the ACC Men's Basketball Player of the Year and the ACC Athlete of the Year for the 1971–72 season when he averaged 21.6 points per game and led the Cavaliers to their second postseason appearance in school history. His number 40 was retired at the end of his senior season. In 2002, Parkhill was named to the ACC 50th Anniversary men's basketball team as one of the 50 greatest players in Atlantic Coast Conference history.

University of Virginia Career
SEASONS	GP	FG%	FT%	RPG	APG	PPG
1969-70	Freshmen Stats Were Not Available
1970-71	26	42.1	80.7	4.0	4.8	15.9
1971-72	28	45.2	76.5	4.5	4.3	21.6
1972-73	25	40.2	82.7	3.7	5.0	16.8
Totals	79	42.8	79.6	4.1	4.7	18.2

=== Professional ===
In his ABA career, Parkhill played in 173 games and scored a total of 970 points. His best year as a professional came during the 1975 season with the Virginia Squires appearing in 78 games and scoring 607 points.

==== Regular season ====
Professional Career
Year	Ag	Tm	Lg	G	MP	FG	FGA	3P	3PA	FT	FTA	ORB	DRB	TRB	AST	STL	BLK	TO	PF	PTS	PPG
1974	22	VIR	ABA	60	869	115	310	3	16	50	61	13	52	65	96	28	12	80	151	283	4.7
1975	23	VIR	ABA	78	1870	266	638	0	8	75	100	27	106	133	226	50	11	170	228	607	7.8
1976	24	SSL	ABA	35	377	37	100	1	11	5	8	2	24	26	64	9	7	29	46	80	2.3
TOTALS				173	3116	418	1048	4	35	130	169	42	182	224	386	87	30	279	425	970	5.6

==== Playoffs ====
Year	Team	GP	GS	MPG	FG%	3P%	FT%	RPG	APG	SPG	BPG	PPG
1973–74	Los Angeles	3	-	3.0	.429	–	–	.3	.7	.3	.0	2.0

== Post-playing career ==
=== Coaching ===
- 1977–1978 – University of Virginia, Graduate Assistant Coach (under Terry Holland)
- 1978–1983 – Assistant Coach, William & Mary (under brother Bruce Parkhill)
- 1984–1987 – Head Coach, William & Mary (Record: 43–68, .387)
- 1989–1990 – Head Coach, Saint Michael's College (Record: 9–18, .333)
- 1990–1992 – Assistant Coach, Navy

=== Administration ===
- 1992–1994 – Associate Director of Regional Development, University of Virginia Office of Development
- 1995–1998 – Director of Alumni Development, University of Virginia Alumni Association / Director of Capital Projects for Athletics
- 1999–present – University of Virginia Associate Director of Athletics for Development
