= 1970–71 Ohio State Buckeyes men's basketball team =

American college basketball season

1970–71 Ohio State Buckeyes men's basketball
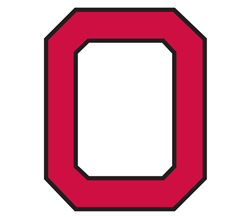

Big Ten Champions

NCAA Men's Division I Tournament, Elite Eight
- Conference: Big Ten Conference

Ranking
- Coaches: No. 10
- AP: No. 10
- Record: 20–6 (13–1 Big Ten)
- Head coach: Fred Taylor (13th season)
- Home arena: St. John Arena

1970–71 Big Ten Conference men's basketball standings
	Conf.				Overall
Team	W		L	PCT	W		L	PCT
No. 10 Ohio State	13	–	1	.929	20	–	6	.769
Michigan	12	–	2	.857	19	–	7	.731
Purdue	11	–	3	.786	18	–	7	.720
Indiana	9	–	5	.643	17	–	7	.708
Illinois	5	–	9	.357	11	–	12	.478
Minnesota	5	–	9	.357	11	–	13	.458
Michigan State	4	–	10	.286	10	–	14	.417
Iowa	4	–	10	.286	9	–	15	.375
Wisconsin	4	–	10	.286	9	–	15	.375
Northwestern	3	–	11	.214	7	–	17	.292
Rankings from AP Poll

The 1970–71 Ohio State Buckeyes men's basketball team represented Ohio State University during the 1970–71 season. Led by 13th-year head coach Fred Taylor, the Buckeyes finished 20–6 and won the Big Ten title with a 13–1 record in league play.

== Roster ==
1970–71 Ohio State Buckeyes men's basketball team
Players	Coaches
Pos. / # / Name / Height / Weight / Year / Hometown; G / 35 / Jim Cleamons / 6 ft 3 in (1.91 m) / 185 lb (84 kg) / Sr	Head coach: Fred Taylor (Ohio State); Assistant coach(es) Legend: (C) Team captain; (S) Suspended; (I) Ineligible; (W) Walk-on; Injured; Current redshirt

== Schedule/results ==
Date time, TV	Rank^{#}	Opponent^{#}	Result	Record	Site (attendance) city, state
Regular Season
Mar 9, 1971	No. 12	Indiana	W 91–75	19–5 (13–1)	St. John Arena; Columbus, OH
NCAA Tournament
Mar 18, 1971*	No. 10	vs. No. 2 Marquette	W 60–59	20–5	Stegeman Coliseum; Athens, GA
Mar 20, 1971*	No. 10	vs. No. 7 Western Kentucky; Mideast Regional Final	L 78–81 ^{OT}	20–6	Stegeman Coliseum; Athens, GA
*Non-conference game. ^{#}Rankings from AP Poll. (#) Tournament seedings in parentheses. All times are in Eastern Time.

== Team players in the 1971 NBA draft ==
Round	Pick	Player	NBA club
1	13	Jim Cleamons	Los Angeles Lakers
