= 1970–71 Illinois Fighting Illini men's basketball team =

American college basketball season

1970–71 Illinois Fighting Illini men's basketball
- Conference: Big Ten Conference
- Record: 11-12 (5–9 Big Ten)
- Head coach: Harv Schmidt (4th season)
- Assistant coaches: Dick Campbell (4th season); Jim Wright (12th season); Nat Frazier (1st season)
- MVP: Rick Howat
- Captains: Rick Howat; Fred Miller
- Home arena: Assembly Hall

1970–71 Big Ten Conference men's basketball standings
	Conf.				Overall
Team	W		L	PCT	W		L	PCT
No. 10 Ohio State	13	–	1	.929	20	–	6	.769
Michigan	12	–	2	.857	19	–	7	.731
Purdue	11	–	3	.786	18	–	7	.720
Indiana	9	–	5	.643	17	–	7	.708
Illinois	5	–	9	.357	11	–	12	.478
Minnesota	5	–	9	.357	11	–	13	.458
Michigan State	4	–	10	.286	10	–	14	.417
Iowa	4	–	10	.286	9	–	15	.375
Wisconsin	4	–	10	.286	9	–	15	.375
Northwestern	3	–	11	.214	7	–	17	.292
Rankings from AP Poll

The 1970–71 Illinois Fighting Illini men's basketball team represented the University of Illinois.

== Regular season ==
Head coach Harv Schmidt, in only his fourth season at the helm of the Fighting Illini men's basketball team, saw the longest losing streak of his career, 8 games. After starting the year by winning 9 of their first 12 games and 10 of their first 14, the Illini started their losing streak at Ohio State on February 13, and continue for a month. The agonizing month ended March 13, 1971, when the Illini visited Indiana in the season finale. The Fighting Illini finished the season with an 11-12 record, tied for 5th place in the conference with a 5-9 record.

The Illini added sophomore forward Nick Weatherspoon for the season. Weatherspoon finished his inaugural season by scoring 381 points, averaging 16.5 points per game, and collected 246 rebounds. By the completion of his time at Illinois, Weatherspoon was their all-time leading scorer.

The 1970-71 team's starting lineup included Weatherspoon and Fred Miller at the forward spots, Jim Krelle and Rick Howat as guards and Greg Jackson at center.

=== Roster ===
1970–71 Illinois Fighting Illini men's basketball team
Players
Coaches

Pos.	#	Name	Height	Weight	Year	Previous school	Hometown
G	10	Rick Howat (C)	6 ft 2 in (1.88 m)	160 lb (73 kg)	Sr	Downers Grove North High School	Downers Grove, Illinois
F	12	Nick Weatherspoon	6 ft 6 in (1.98 m)	185 lb (84 kg)	So	McKinley High School	Canton, Ohio
G/F	14	Fred Miller (C)	6 ft 4 in (1.93 m)	210 lb (95 kg)	Sr	Pekin High School	Pekin, Illinois
G	21	Larry Cohen	6 ft 2 in (1.88 m)	180 lb (82 kg)	So	New Trier East High School	Wilmette, Illinois
G	25	Jim Krelle	6 ft 3 in (1.91 m)	180 lb (82 kg)	Jr	Aurora West High School	Aurora, Illinois
C	31	Greg Jackson	6 ft 8 in (2.03 m)	265 lb (120 kg)	Sr	St. Philip High School	Chicago, Illinois
G	32	Sam Scaletta	6 ft 0 in (1.83 m)	170 lb (77 kg)	Jr	Eisenhower High School	Blue Island, Illinois
G/F	33	Alvin O'Neal	6 ft 4 in (1.93 m)	183 lb (83 kg)	So	Spalding High School	Peoria, Illinois
F	35	Jim Rucks	6 ft 3 in (1.91 m)	205 lb (93 kg)	So	Waukegan High School	Waukegan, Illinois
F	40	Tom Dezort	6 ft 5 in (1.96 m)	195 lb (88 kg)	Jr	Edwardsville High School	Edwardsville, Illinois
G	43	Bob Shapland	6 ft 2 in (1.88 m)	185 lb (84 kg)	Sr	Central High School	Champaign, Illinois
F	44	Jed Foster	6 ft 6 in (1.98 m)	205 lb (93 kg)	So	Fairfield High School	Fairfield, Illinois
F/C	45	Nick Conner	6 ft 6 in (1.98 m)	195 lb (88 kg)	So	East High School	Columbus, Ohio
F/C	54	Jim DeDecker	6 ft 10 in (2.08 m)	220 lb (100 kg)	So	Alleman High School	Moline, Illinois

Head coach

- Harv Schmidt (University of Illinois) (4th year)

Assistant coach(es)

- Dick Campbell (4th year)
- Jim Wright (University of Illinois) (12th year)

Legend

- (C) Team captain
- (S) Suspended
- (I) Ineligible
- (W) Walk-on
- Injured
- Current redshirt

Roster

== Schedule ==
Date time, TV	Rank^{#}	Opponent^{#}	Result	Record	Site (attendance) city, state
Non-Conference regular season
12/1/1970*		Butler	W 113-102	1 - 0	Assembly Hall (16,128); Champaign, IL
12/5/1970*		Oklahoma	L 72-74	1 - 1	Assembly Hall (16,128); Champaign, IL
12/8/1970*		Vanderbilt	W 96-79	2 - 1	Assembly Hall (16,128); Champaign, IL
12/12/1970*		at Iowa State	W 78-63	3 - 1	Iowa State Armory (6,000); Ames, IA
12/14/1970*		Northern Michigan	W 82-70	4 - 1	Assembly Hall (16,128); Champaign, IL
12/26/1970*		vs. No. 13 Villanova; Rainbow Classic	L 76-89	4-2	Neal S. Blaisdell Center (7,500); Honolulu, HI
12/30/1970*		vs. St. Louis; Rainbow Classic	W 78-60	5-2	Neal S. Blaisdell Center (1,414); Honolulu, HI
Big Ten regular season
1/9/1971		Michigan State	W 89-61	6 - 2 (1 - 0)	Assembly Hall (16,128); Champaign, IL
1/12/1971		Wisconsin	W 84-82	7 - 2 (2 - 0)	Assembly Hall (16,128); Champaign, IL
1/16/1971		at Michigan State	W 69-67	8 - 2 (3 - 0)	Jenison Fieldhouse (7,323); East Lansing, MI
1/29/1971*	No. 18	vs. No. 3 Southern California	L 68-81	8 - 3	Chicago Stadium (15,000); Chicago, IL
1/30/1971*	No. 18	vs. No. 7 Notre Dame	W 69-66 ^{OT}	9 - 3	Chicago Stadium (17,000); Chicago, IL
2/2/1971	No. 15	at Iowa; Rivalry	L 84-92	9 - 4 (3 - 1)	Iowa Field House (13,105); Iowa City, IA
2/6/1971	No. 15	Minnesota	W 93-78	10 - 4 (4 - 1)	Assembly Hall (16,128); Champaign, IL
2/13/1971		at Ohio State	L 72-92	10 - 5 (4 - 2)	St. John Arena (13,489); Columbus, OH
2/16/1971		Purdue	L 70-73	10 - 6 (4 - 3)	Assembly Hall (16,128); Champaign, IL
2/20/1971		Indiana; Rivalry	L 86-88	10 - 7 (4 - 4)	Assembly Hall (16,128); Champaign, IL
2/23/1971		at Wisconsin	L 84-88	10 - 8 (4 - 5)	Wisconsin Field House (5,878); Madison, WI
2/27/1971		at Minnesota	L 64-80	10 - 9 (4 - 6)	Williams Arena (7,317); Minneapolis, MN
3/2/1971		Michigan	L 74-75	10 - 10 (4 - 7)	Assembly Hall (16,128); Champaign, IL
3/6/1971		at Purdue	L 93-99	10 - 11 (4 - 8)	Mackey Arena (14,123); West Lafayette, IN
3/9/1971		Northwestern; Rivalry	L 70-85	10 - 12 (4 - 9)	Assembly Hall (5,885); Champaign, IL
3/13/1971		at Indiana; Rivalry	L 67-87	11 - 12 (5 - 9)	Assembly Hall (7,286); Bloomington, IN
*Non-conference game. ^{#}Rankings from AP Poll. (#) Tournament seedings in parentheses. All times are in Central Time.

== Player stats ==
Player	Games played	Field goals	Free throws	Rebounds	Points
Rick Howat	23	190	94	67	474
Nick Weatherspoon	23	151	79	246	381
Greg Jackson	23	113	49	157	275
Fred Miller	22	79	65	109	223
Nick Conner	23	74	33	162	181
Jim DeDecker	22	37	16	40	90
Jim Krelle	17	31	12	38	74
Alvin O'Neal	16	24	7	33	55
Jed Foster	21	19	15	40	53
Larry Cohen	17	16	4	12	36
Bob Shapland	12	4	6	6	14
Tom Dezort	5	3	2	2	8
Jim Rucks	2	1	0	2	2
Sam Scaletta	1	0	1	0	1

== Awards and honors ==
- Rick Howat
  - Team Most Valuable Player

== Team players drafted into the NBA ==
Player	NBA club	Round	Pick
