= 1970–71 Purdue Boilermakers men's basketball team =

American college basketball season

1970–71 Purdue Boilermakers men's basketball
- Conference: Big Ten Conference
- Record: 18–7 (11–3 Big Ten)
- Head coach: George King
- Assistant coach: Dave Schellhase
- Home arena: Mackey Arena

1970–71 Big Ten Conference men's basketball standings
	Conf.				Overall
Team	W		L	PCT	W		L	PCT
No. 10 Ohio State	13	–	1	.929	20	–	6	.769
Michigan	12	–	2	.857	19	–	7	.731
Purdue	11	–	3	.786	18	–	7	.720
Indiana	9	–	5	.643	17	–	7	.708
Illinois	5	–	9	.357	11	–	12	.478
Minnesota	5	–	9	.357	11	–	13	.458
Michigan State	4	–	10	.286	10	–	14	.417
Iowa	4	–	10	.286	9	–	15	.375
Wisconsin	4	–	10	.286	9	–	15	.375
Northwestern	3	–	11	.214	7	–	17	.292
Rankings from AP Poll

The 1970–71 Purdue Boilermakers men's basketball team represented Purdue University during the 1970–71 NCAA men's basketball season.

== Roster ==
1970–71 Purdue Boilermakers men's basketball team
Players
Coaches

Pos.	#	Name	Height	Weight	Year	Previous school	Hometown
F	33	George Faerber	6 ft 5 in (1.96 m)	—	Sr
F	22	Bob Ford	6 ft 7 in (2.01 m)	—	Jr	North	Evansville, IN
C	23	Will Franklin	6 ft 7 in (2.01 m)	—	Jr
G		Bill Kroc	—	—
G		Denny Gamauf	—	—
C		Frank Kaufman	—	—
G		Steve Longfellow	—	—
F		Murray Malveaux	—	—
C		Kenny Otto	—	—
F		Mark Phillips	—	—
G/F		Jovon Price	—	—	So	Marion	Marion, IN
G		Rick Risinger	—	—
F		Jim Rogers	6 ft 7 in (2.01 m)	—	Jr	Roosevelt	Gary, IN
G		Randy Thompson	—	—
G	11	Larry Weatherford	—	—	Sr

Head coach

- George King

Assistant coach(es)

- Dave Schellhase

Legend

- (C) Team captain
- (S) Suspended
- (I) Ineligible
- (W) Walk-on
- Injured
- Current redshirt

Roster
Last update: 2016=Mar-06
