= 1970–71 Indiana Hoosiers men's basketball team =

American college basketball season

1970–71 Indiana Hoosiers men's basketball
- Conference: Big Ten Conference
- Record: 17–7 (9–5 Big Ten)
- Head coach: Lou Watson (5th season)
- Home arena: New Fieldhouse

1970–71 Big Ten Conference men's basketball standings
	Conf.				Overall
Team	W		L	PCT	W		L	PCT
No. 10 Ohio State	13	–	1	.929	20	–	6	.769
Michigan	12	–	2	.857	19	–	7	.731
Purdue	11	–	3	.786	18	–	7	.720
Indiana	9	–	5	.643	17	–	7	.708
Illinois	5	–	9	.357	11	–	12	.478
Minnesota	5	–	9	.357	11	–	13	.458
Michigan State	4	–	10	.286	10	–	14	.417
Iowa	4	–	10	.286	9	–	15	.375
Wisconsin	4	–	10	.286	9	–	15	.375
Northwestern	3	–	11	.214	7	–	17	.292
Rankings from AP Poll

The 1970–71 Indiana Hoosiers men's basketball team represented Indiana University. Their head coach was Lou Watson, who, after taking a one-year leave of absence to recover from surgery, returned for his 5th and final year. Jerry Oliver, who filled in for Watson the previous season, again filled in for him when Watson resigned before the last game of the season. For the last time, the team played its home games in New Fieldhouse in Bloomington, Indiana, and was a member of the Big Ten Conference.

The Hoosiers finished the regular season with an overall record of 17–7 and a conference record of 9–5, finishing 4th in the Big Ten Conference. Indiana was not invited to play in any postseason tournament.

== Roster ==
No.	Name	Position	Ht.	Year	Hometown
20	Frank Wilson	G	6–3	So.	Bluffton, Indiana
22	Bootsie White	G	5–8	So.	Hammond, Indiana
23	Larry Gipson	G	5–10	Sr.	Michigan City, Indiana
24	Ken Morgan	F	6–6	Sr.	Indianapolis, Indiana
25	Jeff Stocksdale	F	6–4	Sr.	Lima, Ohio
30	Jim Harris	G	6–1	Sr.	Lorain, Ohio
32	Steve Downing	C	6–8	So.	Indianapolis, Indiana
33	Jerry Memering	F/C	6–7	So.	Vincennes, Indiana
35	George McGinnis	F	6–8	So.	Indianapolis, Indiana
42	John Ritter	F	6–5	So.	Goshen, Indiana
43	Rick Ford	F	6–5	Jr.	Cloverdale, Indiana
44	Joby Wright	F	6–8	Jr.	Savannah, Georgia
54	Kim Pemberton	G	6–3	So.	Osgood, Indiana
55	Ed Daniels	G	6–4	So.	Savannah, Georgia

== Schedule/results ==
Date time, TV	Rank^{#}	Opponent^{#}	Result	Record	Site city, state
Regular season
12/1/1970*	No. 16	Eastern Michigan	W 99–82	1–0	New Fieldhouse; Bloomington, IN
12/5/1970*	No. 16	Kansas State	W 75–72	2–0	Ahearn Field House; Manhattan, KS
12/12/1970*	No. 11	No. 5 Kentucky; Indiana–Kentucky rivalry	L 93–95 ^{OT}	2–1	New Fieldhouse; Bloomington, IN
12/15/1970*	No. 13	at No. 7 Notre Dame	W 106–103	3–1	Joyce Center; Notre Dame, IN
12/18/1970*	No. 13	Ohio	W 97–88	4–1	New Fieldhouse; Bloomington, IN
12/22/1970*	No. 11	Butler	W 111–94	5–1	New Fieldhouse; Bloomington, IN
12/26/1970*	No. 11	vs. Washington State; Far West Classic	L 80–83	5–2	Memorial Coliseum; Portland, OR
12/29/1970*	No. 14	vs. San Jose State; Far West Classic	W 86–76	6–2	Memorial Coliseum; Portland, OR
12/30/1970*	No. 14	vs. Ohio State; Far West Classic	W 85–77	7–2	Memorial Coliseum; Portland, OR
1/9/1971	No. 12	at Northwestern	W 101–90	8–2 (1–0)	Welsh-Ryan Arena; Evanston, IL
1/12/1971	No. 11	Minnesota	W 99–73	9–2 (2–0)	Williams Arena; Minneapolis, MN
1/16/1971	No. 11	at Michigan	L 81–92	9–3 (2–1)	Crisler Arena; Ann Arbor, MI
2/1/1971*		Northern Illinois	W 113–112	10–3 (2–1)	New Fieldhouse; Bloomington, IN
2/6/1971		Purdue; Rivalry	L 81–85	10–4 (2–2)	New Fieldhouse; Bloomington, IN
2/9/1971		Michigan State	W 71–70	11–4 (3–2)	New Fieldhouse; Bloomington, IN
2/13/1971		at Iowa	W 86–84	12–4 (4–2)	Iowa Field House; Iowa City, IA
2/16/1971		Michigan State	W 90–76	13–4 (5–2)	New Fieldhouse; Bloomington, IN
2/20/1971		at Illinois; Rivalry	W 88–86	14–4 (6–2)	Assembly Hall; Champaign, IL
2/23/1971		No. 12 Michigan	W 88–79	15–4 (7–2)	New Fieldhouse; Bloomington, IN
2/27/1971		Northwestern	W 97–74	16–4 (8–2)	New Fieldhouse; Bloomington, IN
3/2/1971	No. 18	at Wisconsin	L 87–94 ^{OT}	16–5 (8–3)	Wisconsin Field House; Madison, WI
3/6/1971	No. 18	Iowa	W 104–88	17–5 (9–3)	New Fieldhouse; Bloomington, IN
3/9/1971		at No. 12 Ohio State	L 75–91	17–6 (9–4)	St. John Arena; Columbus, OH
3/13/1971		Illinois; Rivalry	L 87–103	17–7 (9–5)	New Fieldhouse; Bloomington, IN
*Non-conference game. ^{#}Rankings from AP Poll. (#) Tournament seedings in parentheses.
