= 1970–71 Michigan State Spartans men's basketball team =

American college basketball season

1970–71 Michigan State Spartans men's basketball

Lobo Invitational champions
- Conference: Big Ten Conference
- Record: 10–14 (4–10 Big Ten)
- Head coach: Gus Ganakas (2nd season)
- Assistant coaches: Robert Nordmann; Matthew Aitch
- Captain: Rudy Benjamin
- Home arena: Jenison Fieldhouse

1970–71 Big Ten Conference men's basketball standings
| | Conf. | | | | Overall |
| Team | W | | L | PCT | W | | L | PCT |
|---|---|---|---|---|---|---|---|---|
| No. 10 Ohio State | 13 | – | 1 | .929 | 20 | – | 6 | .769 |
| Michigan | 12 | – | 2 | .857 | 19 | – | 7 | .731 |
| Purdue | 11 | – | 3 | .786 | 18 | – | 7 | .720 |
| Indiana | 9 | – | 5 | .643 | 17 | – | 7 | .708 |
| Illinois | 5 | – | 9 | .357 | 11 | – | 12 | .478 |
| Minnesota | 5 | – | 9 | .357 | 11 | – | 13 | .458 |
| Michigan State | 4 | – | 10 | .286 | 10 | – | 14 | .417 |
| Iowa | 4 | – | 10 | .286 | 9 | – | 15 | .375 |
| Wisconsin | 4 | – | 10 | .286 | 9 | – | 15 | .375 |
| Northwestern | 3 | – | 11 | .214 | 7 | – | 17 | .292 |
Rankings from AP Poll

The 1970–71 Michigan State Spartans men's basketball team represented Michigan State University in the 1970–71 NCAA Division I men's basketball season as members of the Big Ten Conference. They played their home games at Jenison Fieldhouse in East Lansing, Michigan and were coached by Gus Ganakas in his second year as head coach of the Spartans. They finished the season 10–14, 4–10 in Big Ten play to finish in a three-way tie for seventh place.

== Previous season ==
The Spartans finished the 1969–70 season 9–15, 5–9 in Big Ten play to finish in a three-way tie for sixth place.

== Roster and statistics ==
1970–71 Michigan State Spartans men's basketball team
| No | Name | Pos | Year | Height | Pts | Reb |
|---|---|---|---|---|---|---|
| 10 | Brad VanPelt | F | SO | 6–5 | 4.5 | 2.9 |
| 11 | Gary Ganakas | G | SO | 5–5 | 2.1 | 0.9 |
| 13 | Gary Przybylo | G | JR | 6–0 | 0.3 | – |
| 14 | Johnnie Brown | G | JR | 6–1 | 0.6 | – |
| 21 | Rudy Benjamin | G | SR | 6–2 | 21.7 | 4.0 |
| 22 | Bill Kilgore | C | SO | 6–7 | 14.2 | 12.9 |
| 24 | Ron Gutkowski | F | JR | 6–6 | 7.3 | 3.5 |
| 25 | Larry Ike | F | SO | 6–3 | 0.6 | – |
| 31 | Eddie Humphrey | G | SR | 6–2 | 2.0 | – |
| 32 | Jeff VanderLende | F | SO | 6–7 | 3.2 | 2.9 |
| 33 | Paul Dean | F | SR | 6–1 | 4.6 | 2.0 |
| 35 | Pat Miller | G | JR | 6–2 | 11.3 | 5.2 |
| 42 | Brian Breslin | F | SO | 6–5 | 7.8 | 4.0 |
| 43 | Jim Shereda | C | SO | 6–7 | 1.3 | – |
| 45 | William Cohrs | C | JR | 6–6 | 1.3 | 0.7 |

== Schedule and results ==
| Date time, TV | Rank^{#} | Opponent^{#} | Result | Record | Site city, state |
Regular season
| Dec 1, 1970* | | Northern Illinois | L 75–76 | 0–1 | Jenison Fieldhouse; East Lansing, MI |
| Dec 5, 1970* | | at Toledo | W 72–62 | 1–1 | The Field House; Toledo, OH |
| Dec 12, 1970* | | Western Michigan | W 97–85 | 2–1 | Jennison Fieldhouse; East Lansing, MI |
| Dec 14, 1970* | | Butler | W 99–75 | 3–1 | Jennison Fieldhouse; East Lansing, MI |
| Dec 18, 1970* | | at New Mexico; Lobo Invitational semifinals | W 73–69 | 4–1 | The Pit/Bob King Court; Albuquerque, NM |
| Dec 19, 1970* | | vs. Rutgers; Lobo Invitational championship | W 81–71 | 5–1 | The Pit/Bob King Court; Albuquerque, NM |
| Dec 22, 1970* | | Central Michigan | W 85–74 | 6–1 | Jennison Fieldhouse; East Lansing, MI |
| Dec 29, 1970* | | at No. 4 USC; Trojan Invitational semifinals | L 63–88 | 6–2 | Los Angeles Sports Arena; Los Angeles, CA |
| Dec 30, 1970* | | vs. No. 10 Tennessee; Trojan Invitational third place game | L 70–81 | 6–3 | Los Angeles Sports Arena; Los Angeles, CA |
| Jan 9, 1971 | | at Illinois | L 69–89 | 6–4 (0–1) | Assembly Hall; Champaign, IL |
| Jan 12, 1971 | | Iowa | W 84–81 | 7–4 (1–1) | Jennison Fieldhouse; East Lansing, MI |
| Jan 16, 1971 | | Illinois | L 67–69 | 7–5 (1–2) | Jennison Fieldhouse; East Lansing, MI |
| Jan 26, 1971* | | at No. 7 Notre Dame | L 80–104 | 7–6 | Purcell Pavilion at the Joyce Center; South Bend, IN |
| Jan 30, 1971 | | at Ohio State | W 82–70 | 8–6 (2–2) | St. John Arena; Columbus, OH |
| Feb 6, 1971 | | Ohio State | L 76–87 | 8–7 (2–3) | Jennison Fieldhouse; East Lansing, MI |
| Feb 9, 1971 | | Indiana | L 70–71 | 8–8 (2–4) | Jennison Fieldhouse; East Lansing, MI |
| Feb 13, 1971 | | at Minnesota | L 86–97 | 8–9 (2–5) | Williams Arena; Minneapolis, MN |
| Feb 16, 1971 | | at Indiana | L 76–90 | 8–10 (2–6) | Gladstein Fieldhouse; Bloomington, IN |
| Feb 20, 1971 | | Wisconsin | W 97–78 | 9–10 (3–6) | Jennison Fieldhouse; East Lansing, MI |
| Feb 27, 1971 | | at Purdue | L 70–100 | 9–11 (3–7) | Mackey Arena; West Lafayette, IN |
| Mar 2, 1971 | | Purdue | L 60–65 | 9–12 (3–8) | Jennison Fieldhouse; East Lansing, MI |
| Mar 6, 1971 | | at Michigan | L 63–88 | 9–13 (3–9) | Crisler Arena; Ann Arbor, MI |
| Mar 9, 1971 | | Minnesota | W 73–71 | 10–13 (4–9) | Jennison Fieldhouse; East Lansing, MI |
| Mar 13, 1971 | | at Northwestern | L 67–85 | 10–14 (4–10) | Welsh-Ryan Arena; Evanston, IL |
*Non-conference game. ^{#}Rankings from AP Poll. (#) Tournament seedings in parentheses. Source
