= Henry Wilmore =

American former basketball player

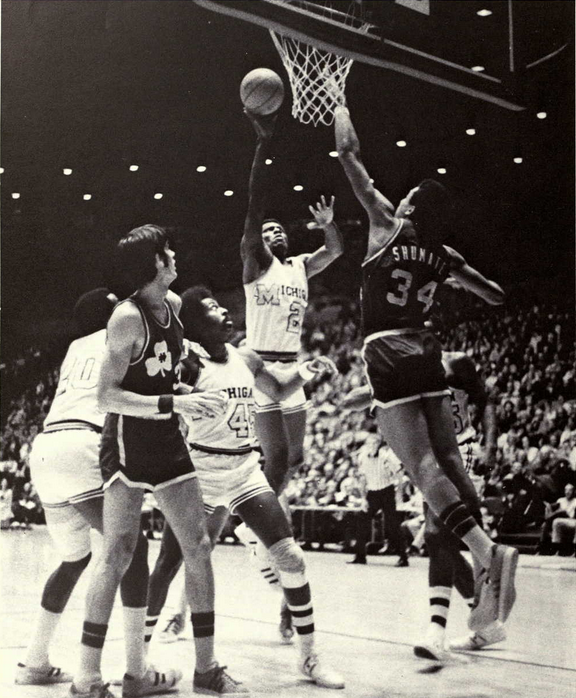
- Wilmore from the 1973 Michiganensian

Personal information
- Born: August 13, 1950 (age 76) New York City, New York, U.S.
- Listed height: 6 ft 3 in (1.91 m)
- Listed weight: 175 lb (79 kg)

Career information
- High school: Rockwood Academy (Berkshire, Massachusetts)
- College: Michigan (1970–1973)
- NBA draft: 1973: 5th round, 78th overall pick
- Drafted by: Detroit Pistons
- Position: Guard / forward
- Number: 25

Career highlights
- Consensus second-team All-American (1972); 2× First-team All-Big Ten (1972, 1973)
- Stats at Basketball Reference

Henry Wilmore (born August 13, 1950) is an American former basketball player who is most known for being a National Collegiate Athletic Association (NCAA) All-American in 1972 while playing for the Michigan Wolverines. He played at the University of Michigan from 1970–71 through 1972–73, scored 1,654 points and grabbed 573 rebounds. A native of Manhattan, New York, Wilmore honed his skills and tenacity by playing streetball at well-known basketball courts, such as Rucker Park.

== College career ==
Freshmen were not allowed to play during 1969–70, his first year at Michigan. However, in his three-year playing career there, he still managed to etch his name into the school's all-time record books by averaging 25.1 points per game as a sophomore, 23.9 ppg as a junior and 21.8 ppg as a senior. His career scoring average of 23.6 ppg is still third at Michigan. A 6 ft 3 in (1.91 m) guard/forward swingman, Wilmore was a two-time All-Big Ten Conference First Team selection and one-time All-Big Ten Second Team honoree. He was twice named an All-American, and was a Consensus Second Team All-American as a junior in 1972. He scored 40 or more points in a game three times, including a career-high 42 against Ohio State in 1971. Wilmore led the Wolverines in scoring all three seasons he played for them. The Detroit Pistons of the National Basketball Association (NBA) selected him as the 9th pick in the 5th round (78th overall) in the 1973 NBA draft, although he never played professionally.

== 1971 Pan American Games ==
Wilmore was chosen to represent the United States on the men's basketball team in the 1971 Pan American Games held in Cali, Colombia from July 25 to August 8. Despite a 2–1 record in the preliminary round (the loss being a 73–69 setback to Cuba), they did not advance to the medal round due to a tie-breaker rule of margins of victory. Three of the competition's strongest teams—the United States, Cuba and Brazil—were controversially all placed in the same preliminary group, with only the top two teams from each group advancing. It was the first time since the Pan American Games started in 1951 that the United States not only failed to advance to the medal round, but also the first time they did not win the gold medal.

Wilmore played in all three games. He shot 11-for-23 from the field and 2-for-2 from the free throw line. He scored 24 total points, which was an average of 8.0 points per game. One of Wilmore's teammates was fellow NCAA All-American and future Basketball Hall of Famer Bob McAdoo.

== See also ==
- Basketball at the 1971 Pan American Games
- University of Michigan Athletic Hall of Honor
