= 1972 NCAA Men's Basketball All-Americans =

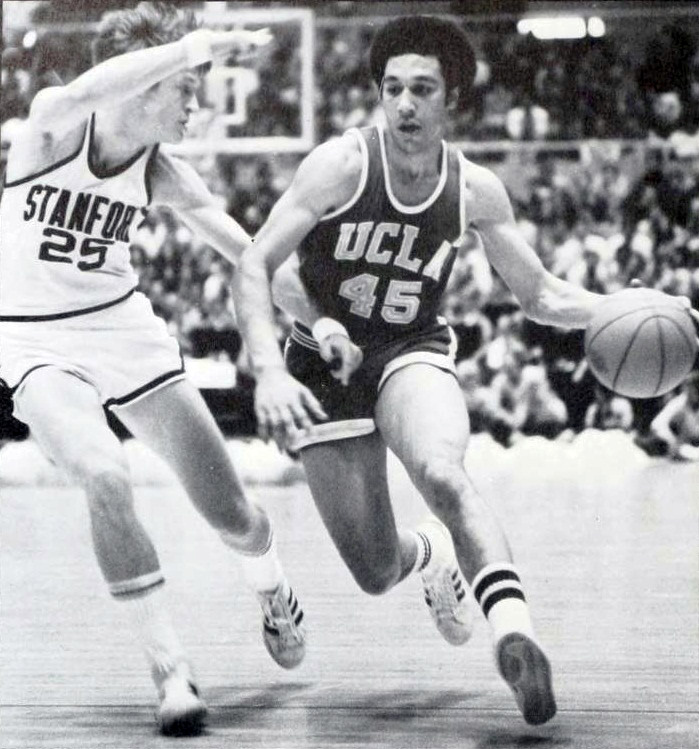
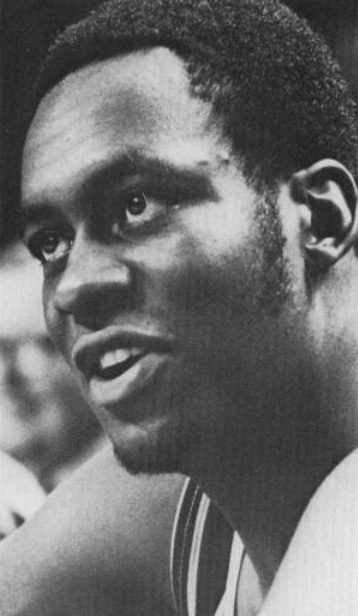
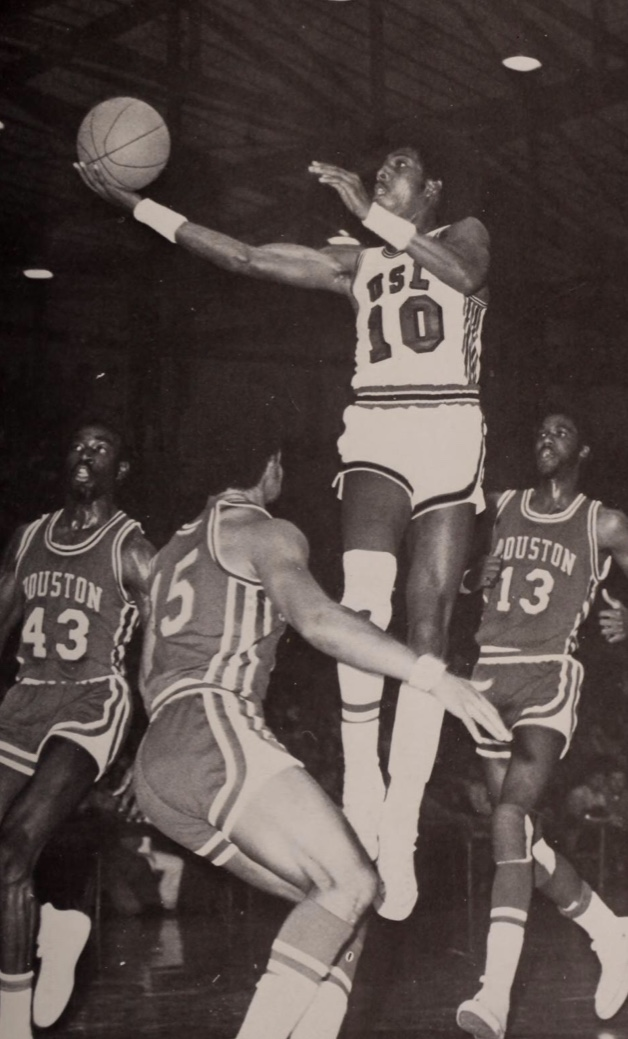
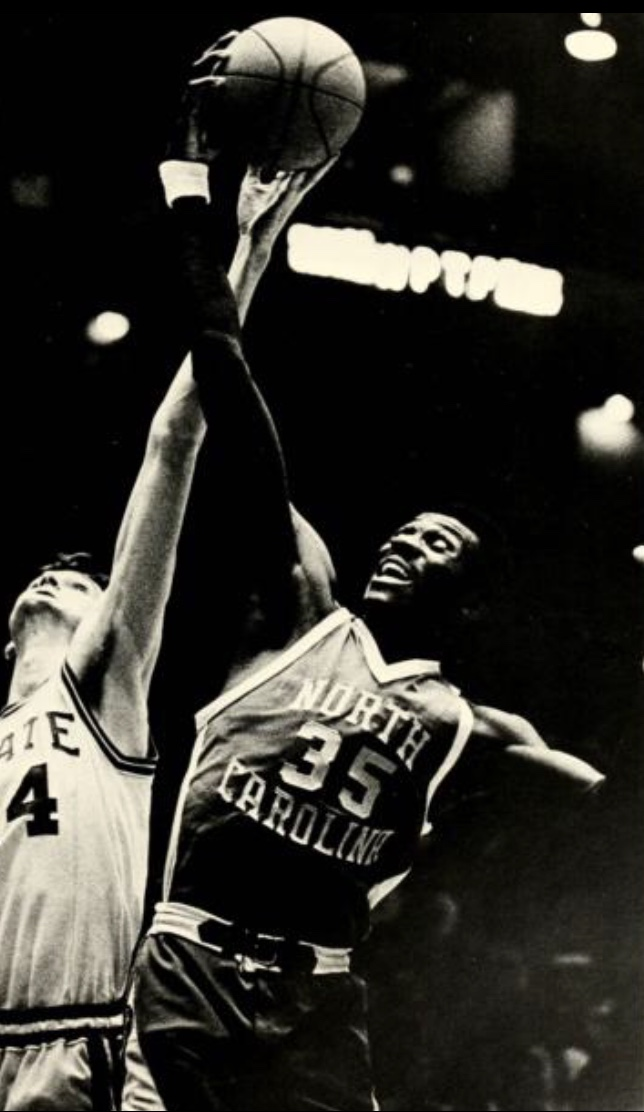
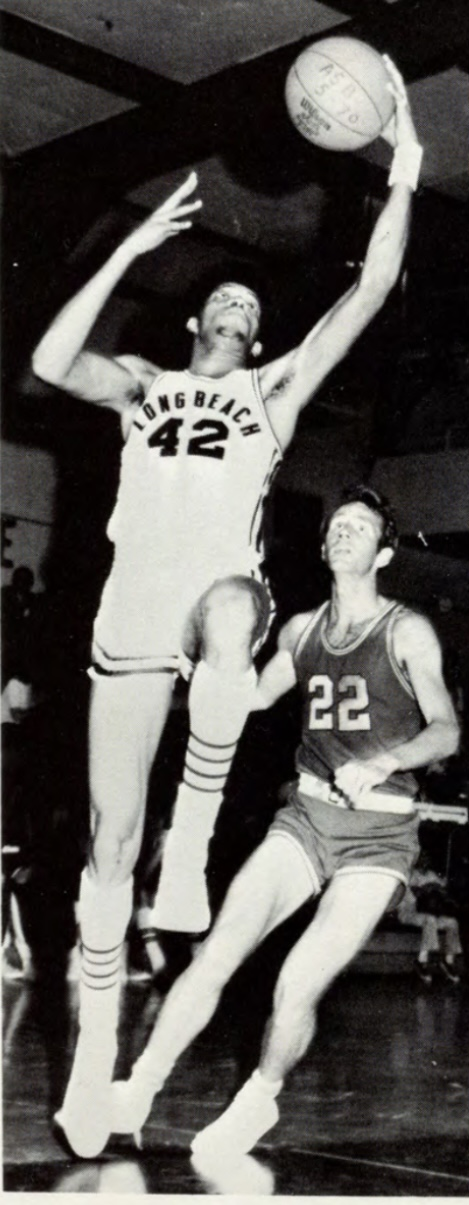
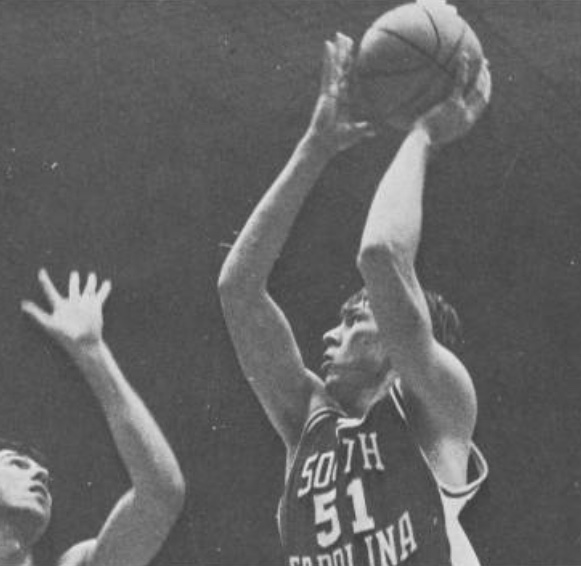
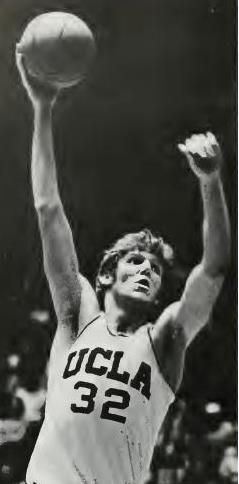
- Members of the 1972 consensus first team. Clockwise from top left: Bibby, Chones, Lamar, Walton, Riker, Ratleff, McAdoo.
- Awarded for: 1971–72 NCAA University Division men's basketball season

The consensus 1972 College Basketball All-American team, as determined by aggregating the results of four major All-American teams. To earn "consensus" status, a player must win honors from a majority of the following teams: the Associated Press, the USBWA, The United Press International and the National Association of Basketball Coaches.

== 1972 Consensus All-America team ==
Consensus First Team
Player	Position	Class	Team
Henry Bibby	G	Senior	UCLA
Jim Chones	C	Junior	Marquette
Dwight Lamar	G	Junior	Southwestern Louisiana
Bob McAdoo	F	Junior	North Carolina
Ed Ratleff	F	Junior	Long Beach State
Tom Riker	F/C	Senior	South Carolina
Bill Walton	C	Sophomore	UCLA

Consensus Second Team
Player	Position	Class	Team
Rich Fuqua	G	Junior	Oral Roberts
Barry Parkhill	G	Junior	Virginia
Jim Price	G	Senior	Louisville
Bud Stallworth	F	Senior	Kansas
Henry Wilmore	G/F	Junior	Michigan

== Individual All-America teams ==
All-America Team
All-America Team	First team		Second team		Third team		Fourth Team	
All-America Team	Player	School	Player	School	Player	School	Player	School
Associated Press	Jim Chones	Marquette	Henry Bibby	UCLA	Rich Fuqua	Oral Roberts	No fourth team	
Associated Press	Dwight Lamar	Southwestern Louisiana	Dwight Davis	Houston	Tom McMillen	Maryland	No fourth team	
Associated Press	Ed Ratleff	Long Beach State	Bob McAdoo	North Carolina	Wil Robinson	West Virginia	No fourth team	
Associated Press	Tom Riker	South Carolina	Barry Parkhill	Virginia	Bud Stallworth	Kansas	No fourth team	
Associated Press	Bill Walton	UCLA	Jim Price	Louisville	Brian Taylor	Princeton	No fourth team	
USBWA	Henry Bibby	UCLA	No second, third or fourth teams (10-man first team)					
USBWA	Rich Fuqua	Oral Roberts	No second, third or fourth teams (10-man first team)					
USBWA	Dwight Lamar	Southwestern Louisiana	No second, third or fourth teams (10-man first team)					
USBWA	Bob McAdoo	North Carolina	No second, third or fourth teams (10-man first team)					
USBWA	Barry Parkhill	Virginia	No second, third or fourth teams (10-man first team)					
USBWA	Jim Price	Louisville	No second, third or fourth teams (10-man first team)					
USBWA	Ed Ratleff	Long Beach State	No second, third or fourth teams (10-man first team)					
USBWA	Tom Riker	South Carolina	No second, third or fourth teams (10-man first team)					
USBWA	Bill Walton	UCLA	No second, third or fourth teams (10-man first team)					
USBWA	Henry Wilmore	Michigan	No second, third or fourth teams (10-man first team)					
NABC	Henry Bibby	UCLA	Dwight Lamar	Southwestern Louisiana	Mel Davis	St. John's	Marvin Barnes	Providence
NABC	Jim Price	Louisville	Bob Morse	Pennsylvania	Allan Hornyak	Ohio State	Kresimir Cosic	Brigham Young
NABC	Ed Ratleff	Long Beach State	Brian Taylor	Princeton	Bob McAdoo	North Carolina	Ernie DiGregorio	Providence
NABC	Tom Riker	South Carolina	Paul Westphal	Southern California	Barry Parkhill	Virginia	John Gianelli	Pacific
NABC	Bill Walton	UCLA	Dennis Wuycik	North Carolina	Henry Wilmore	Michigan	Luke Witte	Ohio State
UPI	Henry Bibby	UCLA	Allan Hornyak	Ohio State	Kresimir Cosic	Brigham Young	No fourth team	
UPI	Jim Chones	Marquette	Bob McAdoo	North Carolina	Tom McMillen	Maryland	No fourth team	
UPI	Dwight Lamar	Southwestern Louisiana	Barry Parkhill	Virginia	Brian Taylor	Princeton	No fourth team	
UPI	Ed Ratleff	Long Beach State	Jim Price	Louisville	Paul Westphal	Southern California	No fourth team	
UPI	Bill Walton	UCLA	Tom Riker	South Carolina	Henry Wilmore	Michigan	No fourth team	

AP Honorable Mention:

- Jim Andrews, Kentucky
- Marvin Barnes, Providence
- Arnie Berman, Brown
- Fred Boyd, Oregon State
- John Brown, Missouri
- Tommy Burleson, NC State
- Corky Calhoun, Pennsylvania
- Bill Chamberlain, North Carolina
- Doug Collins, Illinois State
- Kresimir Cosic, Brigham Young
- Mel Davis, St. John's
- Ernie DiGregorio, Providence
- Roy Ebron, Southwestern Louisiana
- Mike Edwards, Tennessee
- Larry Finch, Memphis State
- Ernie Fleming, Jacksonville
- Harold Fox, Jacksonville
- Richie Garner, Manhattan
- John Gianelli, Pacific
- Steve Hawes, Washington
- Allan Hornyak, Ohio State
- Wendell Hudson, Alabama
- Kevin Joyce, South Carolina
- Greg Kohls, Syracuse
- Bob Lackey, Marquette
- Russ Lee, Marshall
- Allie McGuire, Marquette
- Bob Morse, Pennsylvania
- Bob Nash, Hawaii
- Tom Parker, Kentucky
- Hank Siemiontkowski, Villanova
- Paul Stovall, Arizona State
- Ron Thomas, Louisville
- Tracy Tripucka, Lafayette
- Kermit Washington, American
- John Williamson, New Mexico State
- Henry Wilmore, Michigan
- Luke Witte, Ohio State
- Dennis Wuycik, North Carolina

== See also ==
- 1971–72 NCAA University Division men's basketball season
