= 1972 National Invitation Tournament =

Annual NCAA basketball competition

- Teams: 16
- Finals site: Madison Square Garden, New York City
- Champions: Maryland Terrapins (1st title)
- Runner-up: Niagara Purple Eagles (1st title game)
- Semifinalists: Jacksonville Dolphins (1st semifinal); St. John's Red Storm (13th semifinal)
- Winning coach: Lefty Driesell (1st title)
- MVP: Tom McMillen (Maryland)

The 1972 National Invitation Tournament was the 1972 edition of the annual NCAA college basketball competition.

== Selected teams ==
Below is a list of the 16 teams selected for the tournament.

- Davidson
- Fordham
- Indiana
- Jacksonville
- Lafayette
- Maryland
- Memphis
- Missouri
- Niagara
- Oral Roberts
- Princeton
- Saint Joseph's
- St. John's
- Syracuse
- UTEP
- Virginia

== Schedule ==
The National Invitational Tournament championship game took place on March 25, 1972 at New York's Madison Square Garden.

== Bracket ==
Below is the tournament bracket.

First Round
Lafayette	72
Virginia	71
Jacksonville	94
Fordham	75
Syracuse	81
Davidson	77
Maryland	67
Saint Joseph's	55
Oral Roberts	94
Memphis	74
St. John's	82
Missouri	81
Princeton	68
Indiana	60
Niagara	76
UTEP	57

Quarterfinals
Lafayette	76
Jacksonville	87
Syracuse	65
Maryland	71
Oral Roberts	78
St. John's	'94
Princeton	60
Niagara	65

Semifinals
Jacksonville	77
Maryland	91
St. John's	67
Niagara	69

Finals
Maryland	100
Niagara	69

Third place game
Jacksonville	83
St. John's	80

== See also ==
- 1972 NCAA University Division basketball tournament
- 1972 NCAA College Division basketball tournament
- 1972 NAIA Division I men's basketball tournament
- 1972 National Women's Invitational Tournament
